= Alberti (surname) =

Alberti is an Italian surname that derives from the given name Alberto, Latin translation of Germanic Albert. It may refer to:

- Alberti (family), Florentine family
- Achille Alberti (1860–1943), Italian sculptor
- Aída Alberti (1915–2006), Argentine film actress
- Alberto di Giovanni Alberti (1525–1599), Italian architect and artist
- Alessandro Alberti (1551–1590), Italian painter
- Angela Alberti (born 1949), Italian gymnast
- Barbara Alberti (born 1943), Italian writer, journalist, and screenwriter
- Carlo Alberti (born 1959), Canadian soccer player and coach
- Charly Alberti (born 1963), Argentine drummer, member of Soda Stereo
- Cherubino Alberti (Borghegiano) (1553–1615), Italian engraver and painter
- Domenico Alberti (c. 1710–1740), Italian composer and singer after whom the musical figuration known as the Alberti bass is named
- Dorona Alberti (born 1975), Dutch singer and actress
- Durante Alberti (1538–1613), Italian painter
- Enrico Alberti (born 1947), Italian curler
- Eva Allen Alberti (1856–1938), American dramatics teacher
- Friedrich August von Alberti (1795–1878), paleontologist
- Gasparo Alberti (c. 1480 – c. 1560), Italian composer
- George Alberti (born 1938), British doctor
- Gerlando Alberti (1923–2012), known as "U Paccarè", a member of the Sicilian Mafia
- Giovanni Alberti (painter) (1558–1601), Italian painter
- Giuseppe Matteo Alberti (1685–1751), Italian composer and violinist
- Ignaz Alberti (1760–1794), Austrian illustrator, engraver and book printer
- Innocentio Alberti (c. 1535–1615), Italian composer and instrumentalist
- Irvin Alberti, Dominican comedian and actor
- Johann Friedrich Alberti (1642–1710), German composer and organist
- Jorge Alberti (born 1978), Puerto Rican actor
- Leandro Alberti (1479 – c. 1552), Italian Dominican historian
- Leon Battista Alberti (1404–1472), Italian polymath and architect
- Lucía Alberti, Argentine politician and activist
- Luis Alberti (musician) (1906–1976), Dominican musician, arranger, conductor, and songwriter
- Manuel Alberti, 19th-century Argentine priest and politician
- Mario Alberti (born 1965), Italian comic book artist and writer
- Maryse Alberti (born 1954), French cinematographer
- Micah Alberti (born 1984), American television actor
- Michael Alberti (1682–1757), German physician
- Michele Alberti (16th century), Italian painter
- Peter Adler Alberti (1851–1932), Danish politician
- Pietro Cesare Alberti (1608–1655), First Italian in New Amsterdam, regarded as the first Italian-American
- Rafael Alberti (1902–1999), Spanish poet
- Susan Alberti (born 1947), Australian businesswoman, philanthropist
- Tito Alberti (1923–2009), Argentine jazz drummer
- Viola Alberti (1868–1957), American actress
- Willeke Alberti, Dutch singer, daughter of Willy
- Willy Alberti (1926–1985), Dutch singer, father of Willeke
