= Cesare Ripa =

Italian iconographer

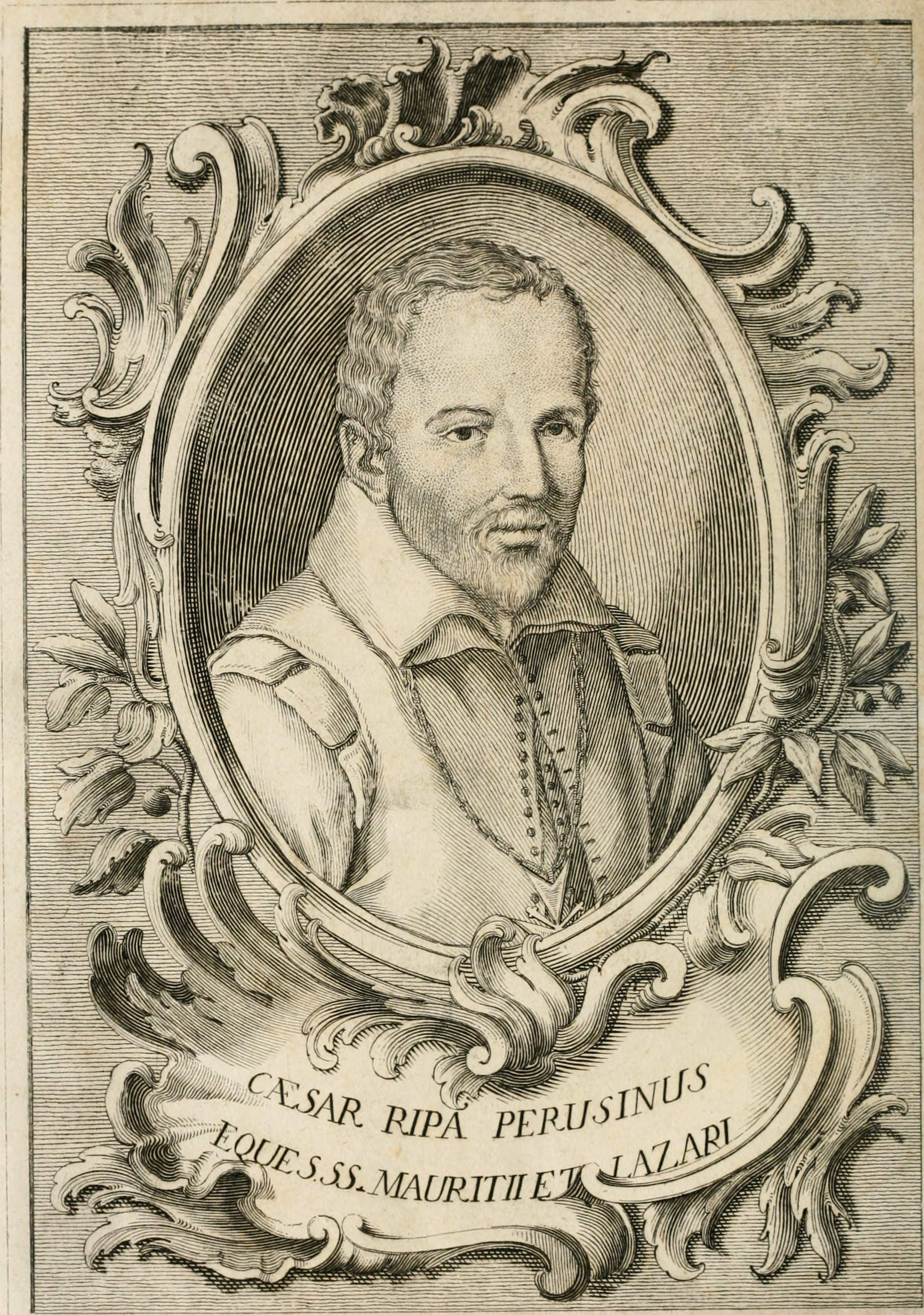
- Portrait of Cesare Ripa in Della novissima iconologia di Cesare Ripa perugino (1624)
- Born: 1555; Perugia, Papal States
- Died: 22 January 1622 (aged 66–67); Rome, Papal States
- Occupations: Iconographer and scholar
- Known for: Iconologia overo Descrittione dell’imagini universali cavate dall’antichità et da altri luoghi (1593)

Academic background
- Influences: Prudentius, Martianus Capella, Domenico Nani Mirabelli, Francesco Colonna, Andrea Alciato, Paolo Giovio, Achille Bocchi, Pierio Valeriano Bolzani, Giglio Gregorio Giraldi, Natalis Comes, Vincenzo Cartari

Academic work
- Influenced: Pietro da Cortona, Lairesse, Mieris, Vermeer, Vondel, Quellinus, Cavallucci, Winckelmann, Richardson, Buscaroli

Cesare Ripa COSML (c. 1555, Perugia – January 22, 1622 Rome) was an Italian Renaissance scholar and iconographer.

== Life ==
Little is known about his life. The scant biographical information that exists derives from his one very successful work: the Iconologia. He was born of humble origin in Perugia about 1555. The exact date of his birth has never been established. He was very active in academic circles as member of the Filomati and the Intronati in Siena, both dedicated to the study of antiquities and of Greek and Latin literature, and the Insensati in his native Perugia.

While still very young he went to Rome to work at the court of Cardinal Antonio Maria Salviati. He attended the Accademia degli Incitati the Accademia di San Luca, where he probably met the Dominican mathematician Ignazio Danti, and was introduced into the learned circles of Baroque Rome. Among the friends who are credited in different editions of his Iconologia with suggestions and even new images are Pietro Leone Casella (c. 1540–c. 1620), whose Elogia illustrium artificum was published in 1606, Prospero Podiani (c. 1535–1615), and the antiquarian Giovanni Zaratino Castellini (1570–1641).

In 1593 Ripa published the first edition of his Iconologia; the work was highly successful, and went through several editions and subsequent translations. Like Vincenzo Cartari’s handbook of mythology, Le imagini dei dei de gli antichi (Venice, 1556), the book was not originally illustrated. The Iconologia rapidly became familiar in practically every painter’s or sculptor’s workshop in Italy and elsewhere in Europe. It appears in the book lists of many 17th-century artists, a painter’s bible to set beside Ovid’s Metamorphoses, and provided the raw material for numerous iconographic programmes.

In 1598 Ripa was knighted Cavaliere dell'Ordine dei Santi Maurizio e Lazzaro by the Pope Clement VIII. He died in Rome on 22 January 1622.

Ripa was a close friend of several artists, most notably the brothers Alberti, Giovanni, Alberto and Cherubino, who used personifications from the 1593 edition of Ripa's Iconologia in their decorations for the Vatican Sala Clementina (1595–1602).

== Work ==
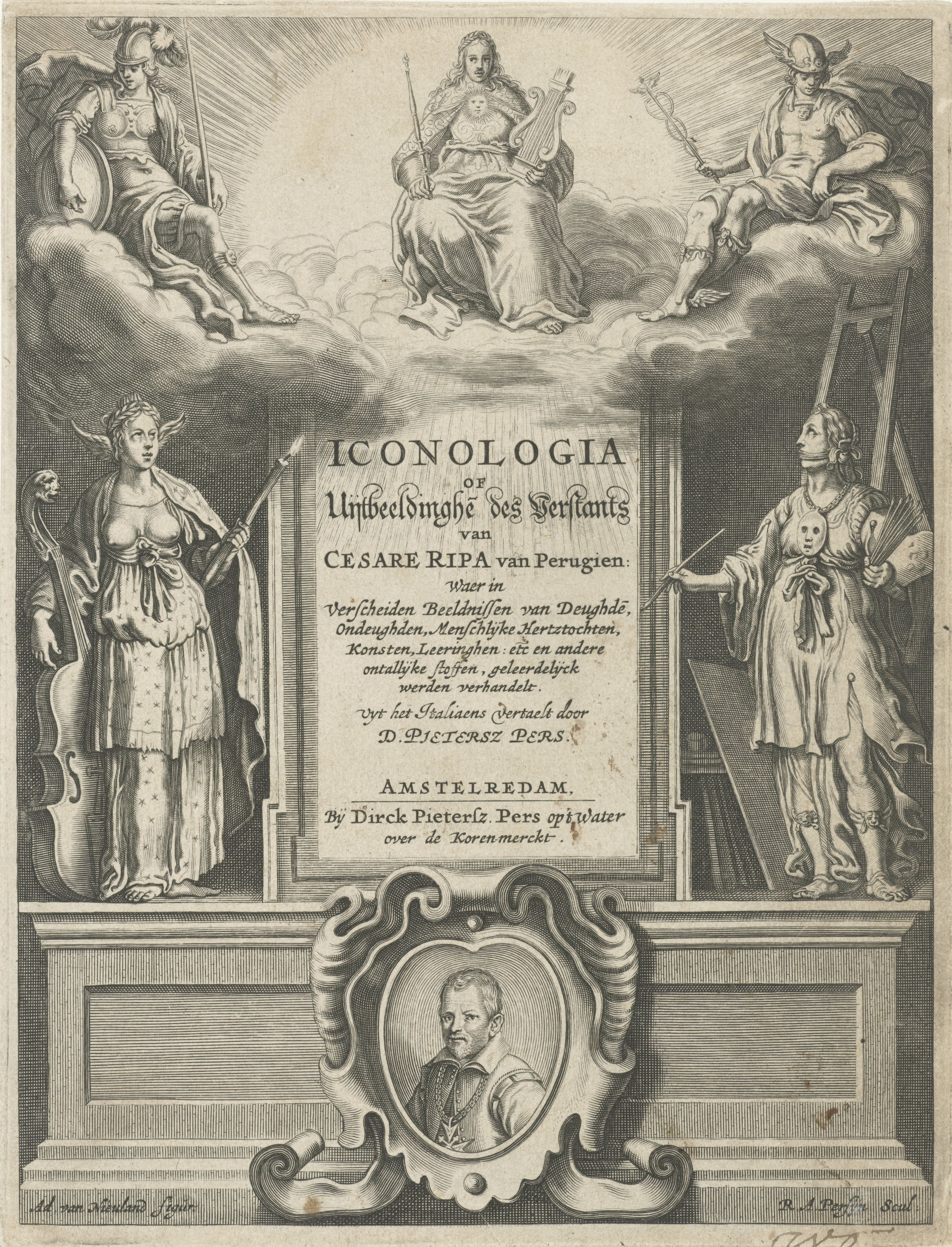
Title page of a Dutch edition of Cesare Ripa's Iconologia. Amsterdam: Jacob Lescaille/Dirck Pietersz. Pers, 1644.

The Iconologia was a highly influential emblem book based on Egyptian, Greek and Roman emblematical representations, many personifications. Besides ancient Roman sculpture and imperial coins, Ripa's most important source was the Hieroglyphica (Basel, 1556 ) of Pierio Valeriano. Other sources were Prudentius' Psicomachia, Martianus Capella's De nuptiis Philologiae et Mercurii, Conrad Gessner's Historia animalium and the Hieroglyphica of Horapollo.

The book was used by orators, artists, poets and "modern Italians" to give substance to qualities such as virtues, vices, passions, arts and sciences. The concepts were arranged in alphabetical order, after the fashion of the Renaissance. For each there was a verbal description of the allegorical figure proposed by Ripa to embody the concept, giving the type and color of its clothing and its varied symbolic attributes, along with the reasons why these were chosen, reasons often supported by references to literature (largely classical).

== History ==
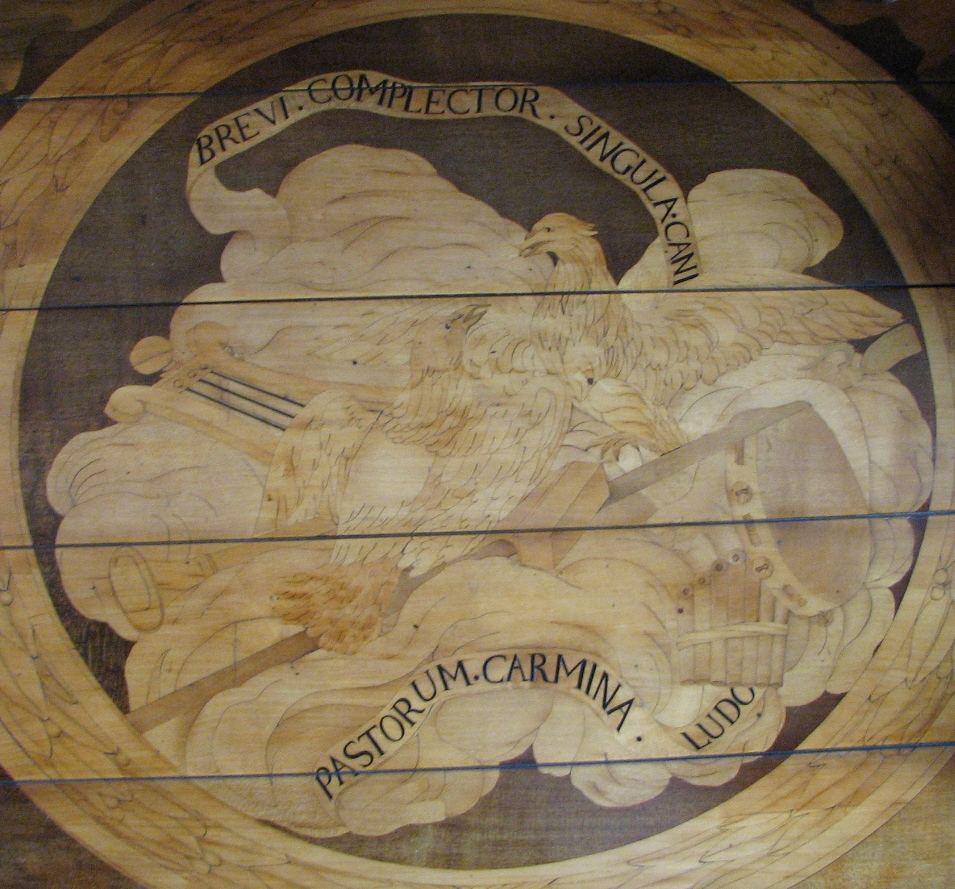
Sentences of the Iconologia illustrating the Bureau du Roi (King's Desk or Louis XV's roll-top secretary) marquetry in the Palace of Versailles

The first edition of his Iconologia was published without illustrations in 1593 and dedicated to Anton Maria Salviati. A second edition was published in Rome in 1603 this time with 684 concepts and 151 woodcuts, dedicated to Lorenzo Salviati. Jean Baudoin translated the Iconologia into French and published it in Paris in 1636 under the title Iconologie. For the French translation, the Flemish engraver Jacob de Bie turned the prints from Ripa's original book into linear figures inside circular frames, thus turning Ripa's allegories into the reverse side of Roman coins.

The book was extremely influential in the 17th and 18th centuries and was quoted extensively in various art forms. In particular, it influenced the painter Pietro da Cortona and his followers. Also Dutch painters like Gerard de Lairesse, Willem van Mieris based work on Ripa's emblems. Vermeer used the emblem for the muse Clio for his The Art of Painting, and several others in his The Allegory of Faith. A large part of Vondel's work cannot be understood without this allegorical source, and ornamentation of the Amsterdam townhall by Artus Quellinus, a sculptor, is totally dependent on Ripa. An English translation appeared in 1709 by Pierce Tempest.

The baroque painter Antonio Cavallucci drew inspiration for his painting Origin of Music from the book. In 1779, the Scottish architect George Richardson's Iconology; or a Collection of Emblematical Figures; containing four hundred and twenty-four remarkable subjects, moral and instructive; in which are displayed the beauty of Virtue and deformity of Vice was published in London. The drawings were by William Hamilton.

Several editions of the Iconologia appeared throughout Europe in XVII and XVIII centuries (Paris, 1636; Amsterdam, 1644, 1657, 1698; Hamburg, 1659; Frankfurt, 1669-70; Augusta, 1704; London, 1709; Nürburg, 1732-34; Delft, 1726, 1743-50),

Ripa's work fell out of favor with the rise of neoclassicism in the mid-eighteenth century. In his Versuch einer Allegorie, written between 1759 and 1763, Winckelmann harshly criticizes Ripa. “In the whole of the Iconologia of Cesare Ripa,” snorted Winckelmann, “there are two or three passable allegories.” Winckelmann's attack was effective in the long term, and only recently have scholars rediscovered the seminal importance of Ripa's Iconologia. In the twentieth century (thanks to the studies by Émile Mâle, Ernst Gombrich and Erwin Panofsky) the book was evaluated as a fundamental tool to interpret early modern art from both a philological and cultural point of view.

== Bibliography ==
- Stefani, Chiara (2000). "Imagini cavate dall'antichità: l'utilizzo delle fonti numismatiche nell'Iconologia di Cesare Ripa". Xenia Antiqua. IX: 59–78.
- Witcombe, Christopher L. C. E. (1992). "Cesare Ripa and the Sala Clementina". Journal of the Warburg and Courtauld Institutes. 55: 277–282. doi:10.2307/751432. JSTOR 751432.
- Le Luel, Nathalie (2003). "Ripa". In Xavier Barral i Altet (ed.). Dictionnaire critique d'iconographie occidentale. Presses universitaires de Rennes. p. 745-747. ISBN 2-86847-644-9.
- Gabriele, Mino; Galassi, Cristina; Guerrini, Roberto, eds. (2013). L'iconologia di Cesare Ripa: fonti letterarie e figurative dall'antichità al Rinascimento. Florence: Leo S. Olschki. ISBN 978-8822270368.

== See also ==
- Andrea Alciato
- Pierio Valeriano Bolzani
