= Medical transcription =

Allied health profession

Medical transcription, also known as MT, is an allied health profession dealing with the process of transcribing voice-recorded medical reports that are dictated by physicians, nurses and other healthcare practitioners. Medical reports can be voice files, notes taken during a lecture, or other spoken material. These are dictated over the phone or uploaded digitally via the Internet or through smart phone apps.

== History ==
Medical transcription as it is currently known has existed since the beginning of the 20th century when standardization of medical records and data became critical to research. At that time, medical stenographers recorded medical information, taking doctors' dictation in shorthand. With the creation of audio recording devices, it became possible for physicians and their transcribers to work asynchronously.

Over the years, transcription equipment has changed from manual typewriters, to electric typewriters, to word processors, and finally, to computers. Storage methods have also changed: from plastic disks and magnetic belts to cassettes, endless loops, and digital recordings. Today, speech recognition (SR), also known as continuous speech recognition (CSR), is increasingly used, with medical transcriptions and, in some cases, "editors" providing supplemental editorial services. Natural-language processing takes "automatic" transcription a step further, providing an interpretive function that speech recognition alone does not provide.

In the past, these medical reports consisted of very abbreviated handwritten notes that were added in the patient's file for interpretation by the primary physician responsible for the treatment. Ultimately, these handwritten notes and typed reports were consolidated into a single patient file and physically stored along with thousands of other patient records in the medical records department. Whenever the need arose to review the records of a specific patient, the patient's file would be retrieved from the filing cabinet and delivered to the requesting physician. To enhance this manual process, many medical record documents were produced in duplicate or triplicate by means of carbon copy.

In recent years, medical records have changed considerably. Although many physicians and hospitals still maintain paper records, the majority are stored as electronic records. This digital format allows for immediate remote access by any physician who is authorized to review the patient information. Reports are stored electronically and printed selectively as the need arises. Many healthcare providers today work using handheld PCs or personal data assistants (PDAs) and are now utilizing software on them to record dictation.

== Overview ==
Medical transcription is part of the healthcare industry that renders and edits doctor dictated reports, procedures, and notes in an electronic format in order to create files representing the treatment history of patients. Health practitioners dictate what they have done after performing procedures on patients, and MTs transcribe the oral dictation, edit reports that have gone through speech recognition software, or both.

Pertinent, up-to-date and confidential patient information is converted to a written text document by a medical transcriptionist (MT). This text may be printed and placed in the patient's record, retained only in its electronic format, or placed in the patient's record and also retained in its electronic format. Medical transcription can be performed by MTs who are employees in a hospital or who work at home as telecommuting employees for the hospital; by MTs working as telecommuting employees or independent contractors for an outsourced service that performs the work offsite under contract to a hospital, clinic, physician group or other healthcare provider; or by MTs working directly for the providers of service (doctors or their group practices) either onsite or telecommuting as employees or contractors. Hospital facilities often prefer electronic storage of medical records due to the sheer volume of hospital patients and the accompanying paperwork. The electronic storage in their database gives immediate access to subsequent departments or providers regarding the patient's care to date, notation of previous or present medications, notification of allergies, and establishes a history on the patient to facilitate healthcare delivery regardless of geographical distance or location.

The term transcript, or "report" is used to refer to a healthcare professional's specific encounter with a patient. This report is also referred to by many as a "medical record". Each specific transcribed record or report, with its own specific date of service, is then merged and becomes part of the larger patient record commonly known as the patient's medical history. This record is often called the patient's "chart" in a hospital setting.

Medical transcription encompasses the medical transcriptionist, performing document typing and formatting functions according to an established criterion or format, transcribing the spoken word of the patient's care information into a written, easily readable form. A proper transcription requires correct spelling of all terms and words, and correcting medical terminology or dictation errors. Medical transcriptionists also edit the transcribed documents, print or return the completed documents in a timely fashion. All transcription reports must comply with medico-legal concerns, policies and procedures, and laws under patient confidentiality.

In transcribing directly for a doctor or a group of physicians, there are specific formats and report types used, dependent on that doctor's speciality of practice, although history and physical exams or consults are mainly utilized. In most of the off-hospital sites, independent medical practices perform consultations as a second opinion, pre-surgical exams, and as IMEs (Independent Medical Examinations) for liability insurance or disability claims. Some private practice family doctors choose not to utilize a medical transcriptionist, preferring to keep their patient's records in a handwritten format, although this is not true of all family practitioners.

Currently, a growing number of medical providers send their dictation by digital voice files, utilizing a method of transcription called speech or voice recognition. As of 2015, speech recognition is still a nascent technology that loses much in translation. For dictators to utilize the software, they must first train the program to recognize their spoken words. Dictation is read into the database and the program continuously "learns" the spoken words and phrases.

Poor speech habits and other problems such as heavy accents and mumbling complicate the process for both the MT and the recognition software. An MT can "flag" such a report as unintelligible, but the recognition software will transcribe the unintelligible word(s) from the existing database of "learned" language. The result is often a "word salad" or missing text. Thresholds can be set to reject a bad report and return it for standard dictation, but these settings are arbitrary. Below a set percentage rate, the word salad passes for actual dictation. The MT simultaneously listens, reads, and "edits" the correct version. Every word must be confirmed in this process. The downside of the technology is when the time spent in this process cancels out the benefits. The quality of recognition can range from excellent to poor, with whole words and sentences missing from the report. Not infrequently, negative contractions and the word "not" is dropped altogether. These flaws trigger concerns that the present technology could have adverse effects on patient care. Control over quality can also be reduced when providers choose a server-based program from a vendor Application Service Provider (ASP).

Downward adjustments in MT pay rates for voice recognition are controversial. Understandably, a client will seek optimum savings to offset any net costs. Yet vendors that overstate the gains in productivity do harm to MTs paid by the line. Despite the new editing skills required of MTs, significant reductions in compensation for voice recognition have been reported. Reputable industry sources put the field average for increased productivity in the range of 30–50%; yet this is still dependent on several other factors involved in the methodology.

Operationally, speech recognition technology (SRT) is an interdependent, collaborative effort. It is a mistake to treat it as compatible with the same organizational paradigm as standard dictation, a largely "stand-alone" system. The new software supplants an MT's former ability to realize immediate time-savings from programming tools such as macros and other word/format expanders. Requests for client/vendor format corrections delay those savings. If remote MTs cancel each other out with disparate style choices, they and the recognition engine may be trapped in a seesaw battle over control. Voice recognition managers should take care to ensure that the impositions on MT autonomy are not so onerous as to outweigh its benefits.

Medical transcription is still the primary mechanism for a physician to clearly communicate with other healthcare providers who access the patient record, to advise them on the state of the patient's health and past/current treatment, and to assure continuity of care. More recently, following Federal and State Disability Act changes, a written report (IME) became a requirement for documentation of a medical bill or an application for Workers' Compensation (or continuation thereof) insurance benefits based on requirements of Federal and State agencies.

== As a profession ==
An individual who performs medical transcription is known as a medical transcriber (MT) or a Medical Language Specialist (MLS). The equipment used is called a medical transcriber, e.g., a cassette player with foot controls operated by the MT for report playback and transcription.

Education and training can be obtained through certificate or diploma programs, distance learning, or on-the-job training offered in some hospitals, although there are countries currently employing transcriptionists that require 18 months to 2 years of specialized MT training. Working in medical transcription leads to a mastery in medical terminology and editing, ability to listen and type simultaneously, utilization of playback controls on the transcriber (machine), and use of foot pedal to play and adjust dictations – all while maintaining a steady rhythm of execution. Medical transcription training normally includes coursework in medical terminology, anatomy, editing and proofreading, grammar and punctuation, typing, medical record types and formats, and healthcare documentation.

While medical transcription does not mandate registration or certification, individual MTs may seek out registration/certification for personal or professional reasons. Obtaining a certificate from a medical transcription training program does not entitle an MT to use the title of Certified Medical Transcriptionist. A Certified Healthcare Documentation Specialist (CHDS) credential can be earned by passing a certification examination conducted solely by the Association for Healthcare Documentation Integrity (AHDI), formerly the American Association for Medical Transcription (AAMT), as the credentialing designation they created. AHDI also offers the credential of Registered Healthcare Documentation Specialist (RHDS). According to AHDI, RHDS is an entry-level credential while the CHDS is an advanced level. AHDI maintains a list of approved medical transcription schools. Generally, certified medical transcriptionists earn more than their non-certified counterparts. It is also notable that training through an educational program that is approved by AHDI will increase the chances of an MT getting certified and getting hired.

There is a large amount of internal debate about which training program best prepares an MT for industry work. Yet, whether one has learned medical transcription from an online course, community college, high school night course, or on-the-job training in a doctor's office or hospital, a knowledgeable MTs are in high demand. In lieu of these AHDI certification credentials, MTs who can consistently and accurately transcribe multiple document work-types and return reports within a reasonable turnaround-time (TAT) are in especially high demand. TATs set by the service provider or agreed to by the transcriptionist should be reasonable but consistent with the need to return the document to the patient's record in a timely manner.

On March 7, 2006, the MT occupation became an eligible U.S. Department of Labor Apprenticeship, a 2-year program focusing on acute care facility (hospital) work. In May 2004, a pilot program for Vermont residents was initiated, with 737 applicants for only 20 classroom pilot-program openings. The objective was to train the applicants as MTs in a shorter time period. (See Vermont HITECH for pilot program established by the Federal Government Health and Human Services Commission).

== The medical transcription process ==
When the patient visits a doctor, the latter spends time with the former discussing their medical problems and performing diagnostic services. After the patient leaves the office, the doctor uses a voice-recording device to record information about the patient encounter. This information may be recorded into a hand-held cassette recorder or into a regular telephone, dialed into a central server located in the hospital or transcription service office, which will 'hold' the report for the transcriptionist. This report is then accessed by a medical transcriptionist, who then listens to the dictation and transcribes it into the required format for the medical record, and of which this medical record is considered a legal document. The next time the patient visits the doctor, the doctor will call for the medical record or the patient's entire chart, which will contain all reports from previous encounters. The doctor can on occasion refill the patient's medications after seeing only the medical record, although doctors prefer to not refill prescriptions without seeing the patient to establish if anything has changed.

It is very important to have a properly formatted, edited, and reviewed medical transcription document. If a medical transcriptionist accidentally typed a wrong medication or the wrong diagnosis, the patient could be at risk if the doctor (or their designee) did not review the document for accuracy. Both the doctor and the medical transcriptionist play an important role to make sure the transcribed dictation is correct and accurate. The doctor should speak slowly and concisely, especially when dictating medications or details of diseases and conditions. The medical transcriptionist must possess hearing acuity, medical knowledge, and good reading comprehension in addition to checking references when in doubt.

However, some doctors do not review their transcribed reports for accuracy, and the computer attaches an electronic signature with the disclaimer that a report is "dictated but not read". This electronic signature is readily acceptable in a legal sense. The transcriptionist is bound to transcribe verbatim (exactly what is said) and make no changes, but has the option to flag any report inconsistencies. On some occasions, the doctors do not speak clearly, or voice files are garbled. Some doctors are time-challenged and need to dictate their reports quickly (as in ER Reports). In addition, there are many regional or national accents and (mis)pronunciations of words the MT must contend with. It is imperative and a large part of the job of the transcriptionist to look up the correct spelling of complex medical terms, medications, obvious dosage or dictation errors, and when in doubt should "flag" a report. A "flag" on a report requires the dictator (or their designee) to fill in a blank on a finished report, which has been returned to him, before it is considered complete. Transcriptionists are never permitted to guess, or 'just put in anything' in a report transcription. Furthermore, medicine is constantly changing. New equipment, new medical devices, and new medications come on the market on a daily basis, and the Medical Transcriptionist needs to be creative and to tenaciously research (quickly) to find these new words. An MT needs to have access to, or keep on memory, an up-to-date library to quickly facilitate the insertion of a correctly spelled device.

== Medical transcription editing ==
Medical transcription editing is the process of listening to a voice-recorded file and comparing that to the transcribed report of that audio file, correcting errors as needed. Although speech recognition technology has become better at understanding human language, editing is still needed to ensure better accuracy. Medical transcription editing is also performed on medical reports transcribed by medical transcriptionists.

=== Medical transcription editors ===
Recent advances in speech recognition technology have shifted the job responsibilities of medical transcriptionists from not only transcribing but also editing. Editing has always been a part of the medical transcriptionist job; however, now editing is a larger requirement as reports are more often being transcribed electronically. With different accents, articulations, and pronunciations, speech recognition technology can still have problems deciphering words. This is where the medical transcriptionist editor steps in. Medical transcription editors will compare and correct the transcribed file to the voice-recorded audio file. The job is similar to medical transcription as editing will use a foot pedal and the education and training requirements are mostly the same.

=== Training and education ===
Education and training requirements for medical transcription editors is very similar to that of medical transcriptionists. Many medical transcription editors start out as medical transcriptionists and transition to editing. Several of the AHDI-approved medical transcription schools have seen the need for medical transcription editing training and have incorporated editing in their training programs. Quality training is imperative to being successful as a Medical Transcription / Healthcare Documentation Specialist. It is also very important to get work experience while training to ensure employers will be willing to hire freshly graduated students. Students who receive 'real world' training are much better suited for the medical transcription industry, than those who do not.

== Outsourcing of medical transcription ==
Due to the increasing demand to document medical records, countries have started to outsource the services of medical transcription. The main reason for outsourcing is stated to be the cost advantage due to cheap labor in developing countries, and their currency rates as compared to the US dollar.

There is a volatile controversy on whether medical transcription work should be outsourced, mainly due to three reasons:

1. The greater majority of MTs presently work from home offices rather than in hospitals, working off-site for "national" transcription services. It is predominantly those nationals located in the United States who are striving to outsource work to other-than-US-based transcriptionists. In outsourcing work to sometimes lesser-qualified and lower-paid non-US MTs, the nationals can force US transcriptionists to accept lower rates, at the risk of losing business altogether to the cheaper outsourcing providers. In addition to the low line rates forced on US transcriptionists, US MTs are often paid as ICs (independent contractors); thus, the nationals save on employee insurance and benefits offered, etc. Unfortunately for the state of healthcare-related administrative costs in the United States, in outsourcing, the nationals still charge the hospitals the same rate as they did in the past for highly qualified US transcriptionists but subcontract the work to non-US MTs, keeping the difference as profit.
2. There are concerns about patient privacy, with confidential reports going from the country where the patient is located (e.g. the US) to a country where the laws about privacy and patient confidentiality may not even exist. The offshore provider has a clear business interest in preventing a data breach and could be prosecuted under HIPAA or other privacy laws, yet the counter-argument is made that such a prosecution might never happen or if tried wouldn't get anywhere. Some of the countries that now outsource transcription work are the United States and Britain, with work outsourced to Philippines, India, Sri Lanka, Canada, Australia, Pakistan and Barbados.
3. The quality of the finished transcriptions is a concern. Many outsourced transcriptionists simply do not have the requisite basic education to do the job with reasonable accuracy, as well as additional, occupation-specific training in medical transcription.
