= The Dictation Lesson =

1891 painting by Demetrio Cosola

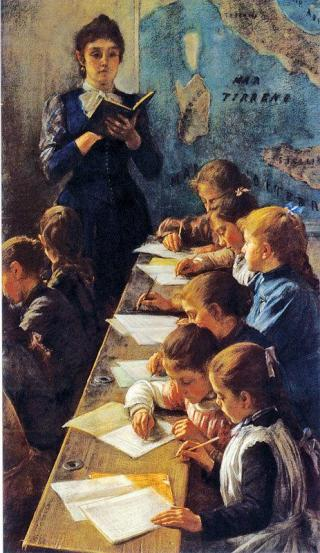
- Artist: Demetrio Cosola
- Year: 1891
- Medium: Pastel on panel
- Dimensions: 185 cm × 95 cm (73 in × 37 in)
- Location: Turin Civic Gallery of Modern and Contemporary Art, Turin

The Dictation Lesson (in italian: Il dettato) is a painting of italian verismo painter Demetrio Cosola. The painting is housed in Turin Civic Gallery of Modern and Contemporary Art. It is a symbolic representation of the establishment of public education in the Kingdom of Italy immediately after unification, and the opening of schools to women, both as pupils and teachers.

== Other versions of the painting ==
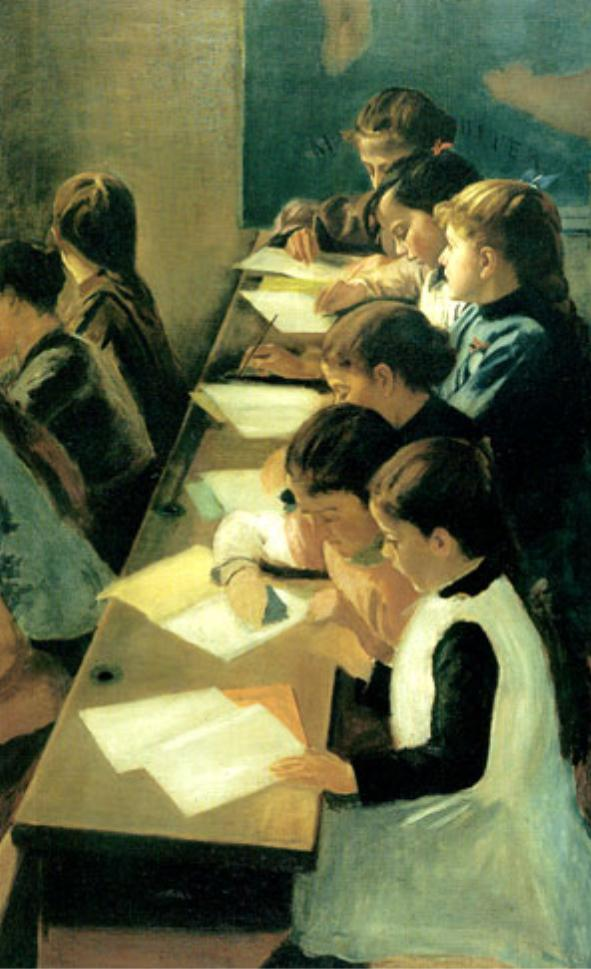
1890 version of the painting, without the teacher

Cosola painted other two smaller versions of The Dictation Lesson (both oil on canvas): one dated 1890 without the teacher, ad a second one with a nun instead, titled The Kindergarten.
