= Cruentation =

Medieval test for a suspected murderer

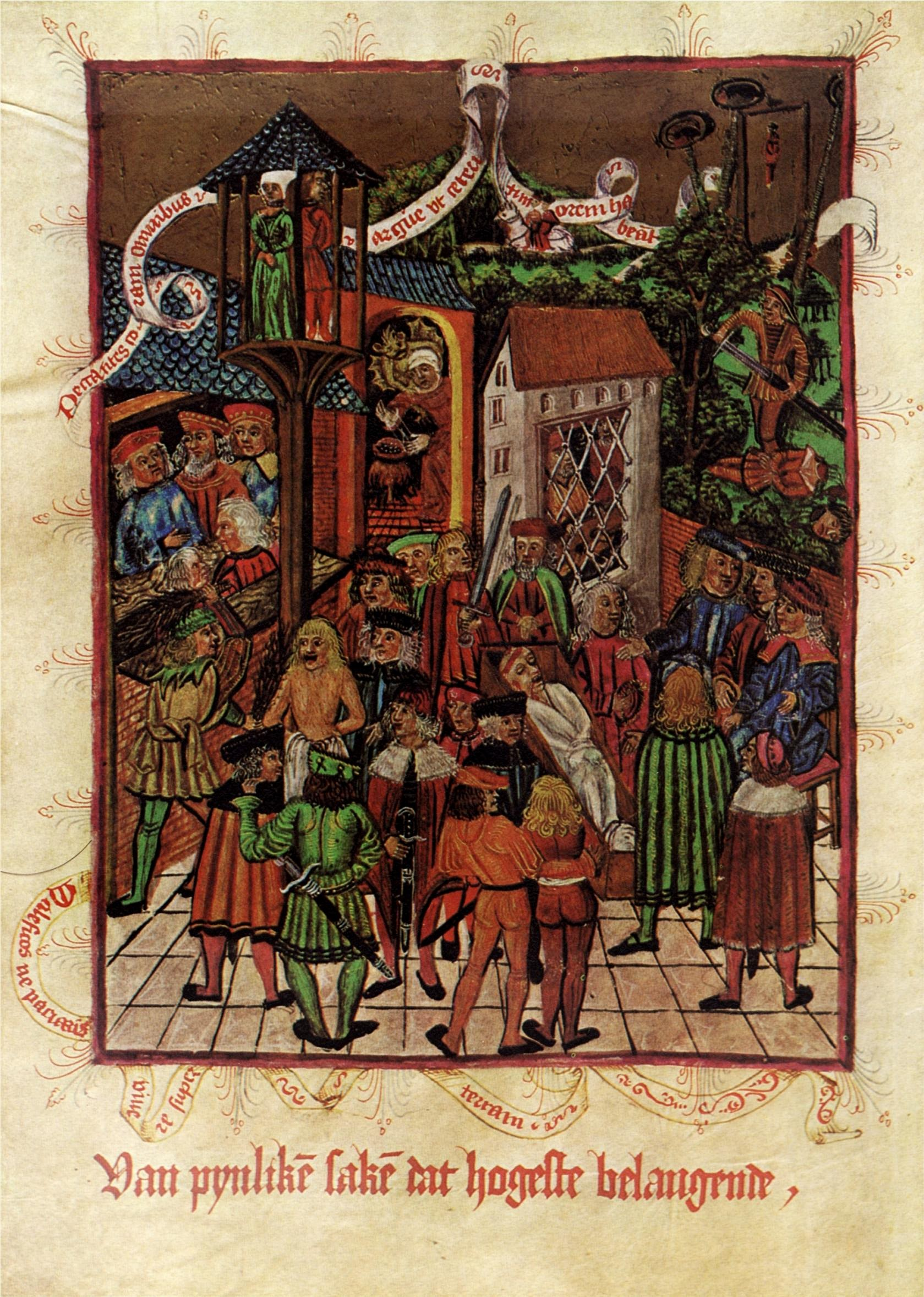
A body in its coffin starts to bleed in the presence of the murderer in an illustration of the laws of Hamburg in 1497

Cruentation was one of the medieval methods of finding proof against a suspected murderer. The common belief was that the body of the victim would spontaneously bleed in the presence of the murderer.

Cruentation was used in Germanic law systems as early as the medieval period, whence it spread to Germany, Poland, Bohemia, Scotland, and European colonies in North America. The practice is mentioned in the Germanic epic poem Nibelungenlied, which was written around 1200. It continued being used as a method to determine guilt of murder in Germany until the middle of the 18th century.

== Use in judicial proceedings ==
Early modern trials privileged explicit human testimony over forensic evidence, unless that evidence represented the testimony of a divine being (i.e., God). However, not all cases could be resolved simply by obtaining a confession. In cases where it was difficult for the jurors to determine whether someone accused of murder was guilty or innocent, the case could be solved by means of a trial by ordeal. In the case of cruentation, the accused was brought before the corpse of the murder victim and was made to put his or her hands on it. If the wounds of the corpse then began to bleed or other unusual visual signs appeared, that was regarded as God's verdict, announcing that the accused was guilty. At the same time, cruentation alone rarely convicted a suspect; more often, the psychological impact of the test caused the suspect to confess.

Cruentation appears in many texts relating to criminal procedure: the Malleus Maleficarum, or King James VI and I's Daemonologie. Nonetheless, contemporaries drew a distinction between cruentation and (to a modern observer) equally occult practices. Other forms of trial by ordeal vanished during the centuries before cruentation's demise, precisely because they (hubristically) effected divine judgement.

Cruentative procedures became increasingly stringent, and in 1545, Antonius Blancus was the first to question the reliability of cruentation as a practice. Nonetheless, the first published refutation appeared in 1669, more than a century later. Yet Michael Alberti's Systema jurisprudentiae medicae [System of Forensic Medicine], published almost a century later, still encourages investigators to rely on torture and cruentation.

== Use in anti-semitism ==
Cruentation was also commonly cited in medieval Europe as evidence against Jews accused of committing ritual murder. Multiple instances of cruentation are described in Thomas of Cantimpré’s mid-13th century work, Bonum universale de apibus (On Bees). In these stories, Jews are accused of torturing and murdering young Christian children, evocative of the narrative of Jews crucifying Jesus. One of the more notable cases was that of Margaretha, a seven-year-old Christian girl in Germany. While Margaretha's story was described rather vaguely by Thomas of Cantimpré, the tale grew increasingly infamous and detailed as it spread throughout Europe and was elaborated on by later authors.

Thomas claims that a group of Jews purchased Margaretha from her mother; they gagged her, beat her, and slashed her body with knives. Afterwards, the Jews weighed her dead body down to the bottom of a river with stones. A few days later a fisherman found her body and carried it throughout the town, claiming the Jews had committed this malicious act. In the case of Margaretha and other ritual murder stories, as soon as the local Jews were in the presence of the Christian child's corpse, the corpse began to spout blood and occasionally reanimate as if to beg for revenge against their Jewish murderers. The cruentation, Thomas claims, was a testimony to the Jews' guilt.

Cruentation was essential to developing the antisemitic myth of ritual murder and also is related to that of blood libel. Works following the 13th century On Bees describe similar narratives that rely on cruentation as a piece of evidence stacked against Jews accused of the deaths of Christian children in Europe. Thomas never names the little girl; later stories identify her as Margaretha. Additionally, there has been uncertainty surrounding the date and location.

== Scientific explanations ==
As the practice of anatomical dissection became more prevalent, medical professions became increasingly aware of circumstances in which dead bodies could spontaneously emit fluids. As a body begins to decompose, purge fluid begins to accumulate in the lungs. This reddish-brown fluid could leak from the mouth or nose of a corpse as it was moved at a trial.

== Views of the Protestant Church ==
The rise of anatomical approaches to sanguine emissions also coincided with disruption in the theological underpinnings of cruentation. After the Lutheran reformation the practice of cruentation was unwarranted from a legal point of view in Denmark and Norway, and during the sixteenth and seventeenth centuries leading theologians of the Danish Church condemned it several times. Nevertheless, cruentation continued to be used well into the eighteenth century, and its outcome continued to be accepted as evidence by law courts – indeed, in a few cases, the ordeal was overseen or even organized by clergymen. Apparently the practice was so popular that it continued to remain judicially sanctioned for some time even when that meant circumventing the official teaching of the Protestant state church.

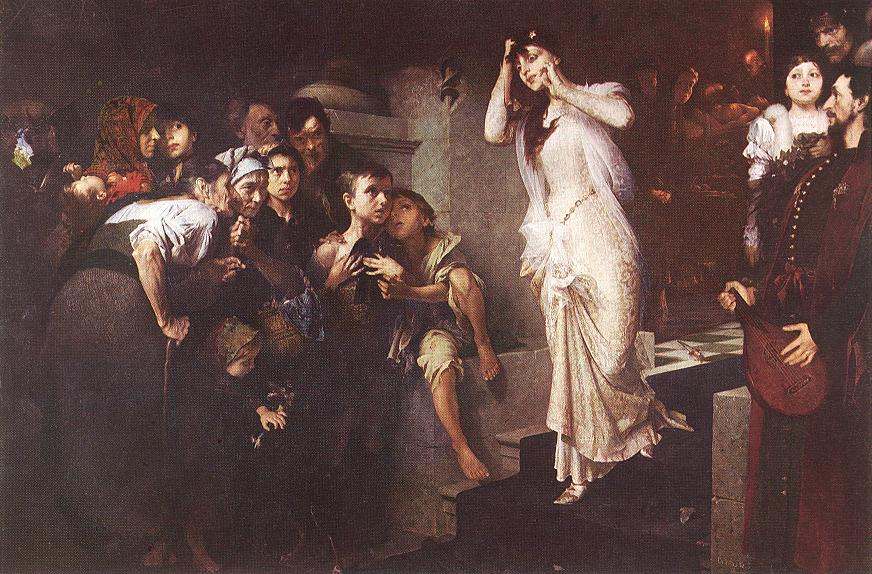
The Ordeal of the Bier (1881), a scene from a ballad by János Arany

== Ordeal of touch ==
This ordeal was called ordeal of touch in 16th-, 17th- and 18th-century England and Scotland, and the belief was that "upon the murderer touching or coming into the presence of the body of the victim, the wounds would bleed afresh." This belief was brought to British colonial America; it is said that the last time this test was used in North Carolina was in 1772, the year following the death of Rev. William Richardson, when "the hand of his widow, Agnes Nancy Richardson, was forcibly held against the skull of her long-deceased husband...No blood was seen, and the widow was not prosecuted for murder." This superstition is referenced by the Lady Anne character in the William Shakespeare play Richard III, "O gentlemen, see, see! Dead Henry's wounds Open their congealed mouths and bleed afresh. Blush, blush, thou lump of foul deformity; For 'tis thy presence that exhales this blood From cold and empty veins, where no blood dwell; Thy deed, inhuman and unnatural, Provokes this deluge most unnatural."
