= Dictation (exercise) =

Transcription of spoken text

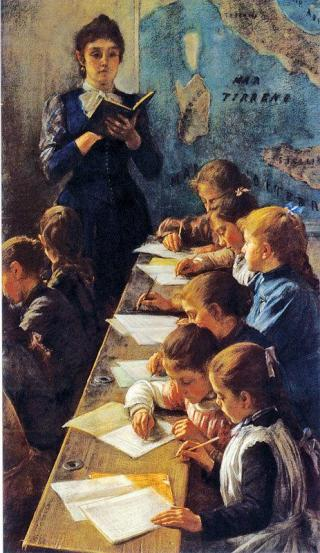
The Dictation Lesson, painting of Demetrio Cosola (1891)

Dictation is the transcription of spoken text: one person who is "dictating" speaks and another who is "taking dictation" writes down the words as they are spoken. Among speakers of several languages, dictation is used as a test of language skill, similar to spelling bees in the English-speaking world. Secondary to teaching language skills, the exercise of dictation has also been used to introduce students to literary works, and to instill morals. Dictation has also been used in an attempt to capture endangered or dying languages, as in the case of Victoria Howard, a Chinook speaker who dictated songs and stories to Melville Jacobs.

== Etymology ==
The word was first used in English in 1624, in the sense "written material for dictating or transcribing" (for example, an important manuscript or book passage). It originated from the Latin word dictātiō (in its accusative form dictātiōnem), the act of the verb dictāre ("to say repeatedly", "to say words for transcription", "to command"), which is the frequentative of dīcere ("to utter", "to talk") and the root of other Latinate English-words such as diction, dictionary, dictator and dictate.

== Method ==
The exercise requires at least two persons: a reciter and a recorder. The reciter reads a selected text, evenly and clearly and at audible volume, by snippets of multiple words (three to ten or as need be). The text is transcribed by the recorders, as the reciter proceeds. Each snippet is read by the reciter at first slowly, then repeated once or twice at a normal pace. Once the selection has been read to the end in this way, the reciter reads the text once again from start to finish at a normal pace. The recorders then have time to re-read their work, and edit where necessary. The exercise in knowledge, comprehension and application comes to a close.

The analysis and evaluation step now proceeds as follows, upon the revelation of the selected text. The process requires a red pen, and can be varied according to the maturity of the recorders, or as to taste:

- the reciter gathers the written work of the recorders and evaluates it;
- the recorders are given the selection and expected to grade themselves.

The latter auto-evaluation process is quicker, but is sometimes trickier for two reasons: one, the handwriting of the recorder is indistinguishable from that of the evaluator; and two, the severity of the evaluator may be in question as the same person (or class of persons) is employed.

The selected texts are often taken from a sentence, a paragraph or a page of a published book, and may include an homily in morals, honesty or nobility. Biblical passages or pages from the Fables of La Fontaine have been employed with success throughout the ages.

== Dictation in different languages ==
=== French ===
For speakers of French, la dictée is a school exercise that aims at testing the mastery of orthography and grammar. Since many features of French grammar are distinguished in writing but not in speech, this can be a challenging task.

Some dictées became famous for their difficulty or their interest, like those of Prosper Mérimée and Bernard Pivot. In several countries of the world (including Switzerland, France, Belgium, Poland, and Canada), the dictations are the subject of structured championships, similar to English spelling bees.

=== Korean ===
In South Korea, badasseugi (Hangul: 받아쓰기) is a school exercise for children in the lower grades of elementary schools. The Korean language is written using hangul, which is basically a phonemic alphabet; however, Hangul writing is also morphophonemic, so morphological knowledge (in addition to familiarity with hangul) is necessary for correct dictation. Also, phonological rules such as assimilation, palatalization, and deletion can cause pronunciation to be different from what the written form may suggest. Badasseugi may take form of a word, a phrase, or a sentence, and is similar to spelling tests.

=== Chinese ===
Dictation in Chinese (simplified Chinese: 听写; traditional Chinese: 聽寫; pinyin: tīngxiě, literally means 'listen and write'; also called Chinese: 默書 in Hong Kong and Macau) is a vital part of Chinese primary school education curriculum. Chinese characters are unique because a single syllable can have different corresponding characters. Since Chinese dictation is usually done in phrases (i.e. words are made up of more than one characters), this can help the person taking dictation to determine the proper character through phrases. Dictation also increases students' ability to write characters properly.

=== Vietnamese ===
Similar to the Korean hangul script, the Vietnamese Latin alphabet is also basically a phonemic alphabet; however, aside from mistakes in standardising the orthography of the language, Vietnamese dialects have some sound mergers (a few of which can be morphophonemically affected) that can confuse people, especially when talking to other people with a different dialect. Therefore, dictation in Vietnamese (Vietnamese: chính tả), also considered a vital part of Vietnamese primary school education curriculum, helps students, and foreign Vietnamese learners, solve these ambiguities.

== See also ==
- Dictated but not read
- Grand Dictation of the Dutch Language
