= San Silvestro al Quirinale =

- St. Sylvester on Quirinal Hill
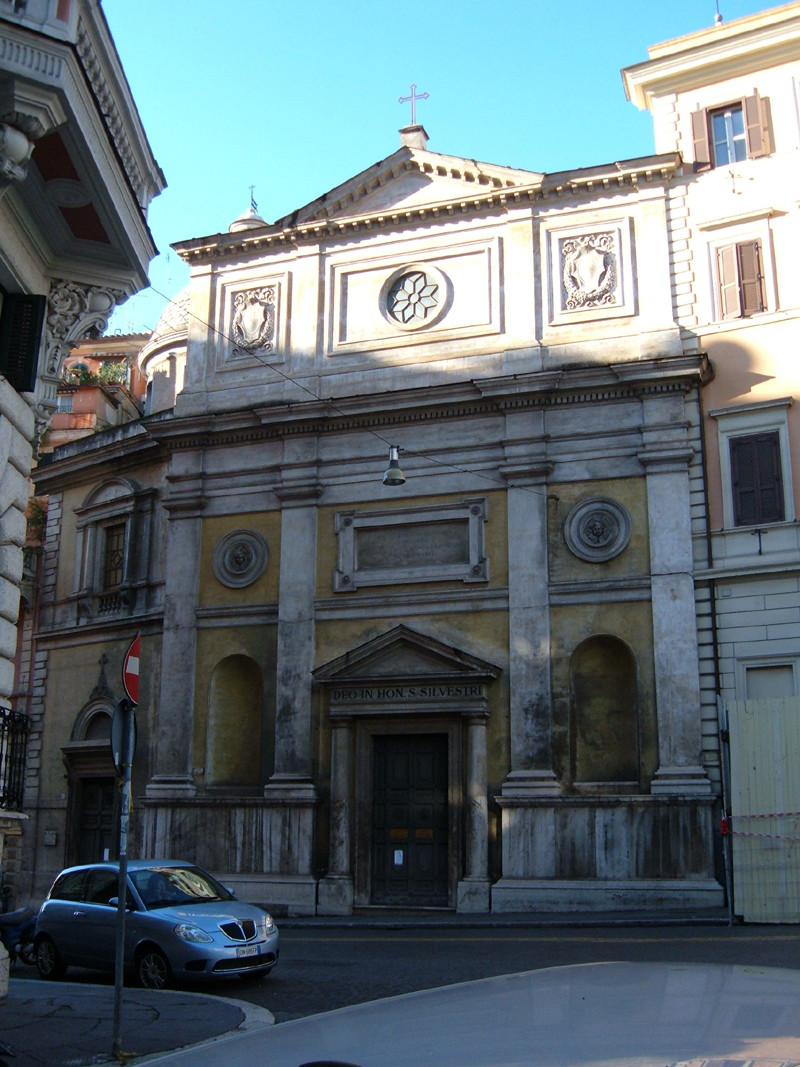
- Façade
- Click on the map for a fullscreen view
- 41°53′50.3″N 12°29′11.6″E
- Location: Corner Via XXIV Maggio with Via Mazzarino, Rome
- Country: Italy
- Denomination: Roman Catholic

History
- Status: Titular church

Architecture
- Architectural type: Church
- Style: Baroque

San Silvestro al Quirinale (or St. Sylvester on Quirinal Hill) is a historic church in central Rome, Italy. It is located near Via XXIV Maggio corner with Via Mazzarino, a few blocks south of the Piazza del Quirinale.

== History ==
The first mentions of a church on the site are from 1039, when it was called Santo Stefano in Cavallo in recognition of its site on Monte Cavallo, a small hill in the Campo Marzio.

In 1507, the church was granted to the Dominicans of the Florentine Congregation of St Mark by Pope Julius II. In 1555, Pope Paul IV gifted it to the Theatine order, and it was rebuilt in 1524–1584. The high altar was consecrated in 1584 by Bishop Thomas Goldwell of St. Asaph's in North Wales, the last Catholic bishop in England under Queen Mary Tudor's reign. In 1801, San Silvestro was granted to the Lazarists, having been abandoned by the Theatines some years before.

In the period when conclaves to elect a new Pope were held at the Quirinal Palace, the inaugural procession of the Cardinals started from this church. When the street was widened in 1877, the 16th century façade was replaced. The old façade had been simple, while the present one, by Andrea Busiri Vici, is more decorated. There is a small garden outside the church, with a 16th-century oratory that was used in funerals. The façade, decorated in stucco, is original.

== Interior decoration ==
The renaissance interior is almost completely covered with paintings. There is a long, vaulted choir behind the altar. In the ceiling is a fresco from the late 16th century by Giovanni and Cherubino Alberti. On the left wall is a fresco by Lazzaro Baldi, depicting St Gaetano and the Blessed Virgin. On the counterfacade of the entrance is the funeral monument of Cardinal Federico Cornaro (1531–1590) attributed to Giacomo della Porta. To the left of the monument to Prospero Farinacci is a painting of Saints Peter and Paul by Stefano Pozzi.

The first chapel on the right side has a tile floor by Luca della Robbia (1525), and has the arms of Pope Leo X. On the walls are frescoes depicting scenes from the lives of St Catherine of Siena and St Mary Magdalene attributed to Polidoro da Caravaggio and/or Maturino da Firenze. In the ceiling, Cavaliere d'Arpino has painted scenes from the life of St Stephen the Deacon.

In the second chapel on the right side is a painting depicting the Nativity of Mary, painted by Marcello Venusti in the 16th century. On the walls are the Circumcision of Christ and Adoration of the Magi by Jacopo Zucchi and The Dream of St Joseph and The Slaughter of the Innocents by Raffaellino da Reggio.

The first chapel on the left side has a fresco by Avanzino Nucci, Pope St Sylvester Baptizing Emperor Constantine. In the ceiling are scenes from the life of St Sylvester, painted in 1868.

The altarpiece in the second chapel on the left is by Giacinto Gimignani, and depicts Pope St Pius V and Cardinal Alessandrino in Adoration of the Virgin. In the centre is an icon of the Madonna with Child of the Roman school, 13th century.

At the end of the left transept, is the Chapel of the Assumption, also known as the Cappella Bandini. The large, octagonal, domed chapel designed by Ottaviano Mascherino in 1585. The Assumption painting is by Scipione Pulzone. The four painted roundels depicting scenes from the lives of David, Judith, Esther and Solomon (1628) are by Domenichino. There are four stucco statues; Magdalene and St John from 1628, by Alessandro Algardi, and St Joseph and St Martha by Francesco Mochi.

In the right arm of the transept is a depiction of The Eternal Appearing to Sts Andrew Avellino and Gaetano Thiene, by Antonio Barbalonga.
