= Verismo (disambiguation) =

Verismo (Italian for 'realism') is used in English for 19th century realist movements in the arts in Italy:

- Verismo (music)
- Verismo (painting)
- Verismo (literature)

== Other uses ==
- Starbucks Verismo, a consumer-grade single-serve coffee machine that used sealed plastic cups of coffee grounds.
