= In the Sun =

In the Sun may refer to:

- In the Sun (Alexander Samokhvalov), a 1953 painting by Alexander Samokhvalov
- In the Sun, a 1884 painting by Demetrio Cosola
- "In the Sun" (Joseph Arthur song), covered by Michael Stipe
- "In the Sun" (She & Him song)
- "In the Sun", a song by Blondie from Blondie
- "In the Sun", a song by Seam from The Pace Is Glacial
- In the Sun, an album by Thomas Rusiak

== See also ==
- In the Sunlight, a 1915 American silent short film
