= Demetrio Cosola =

Italian painter (1851–1895)

- Born: Demetrio Cosola; 22 September 1851; San Sebastiano da Po, Italy
- Died: 27 February 1895 (aged 43); Chivasso, Italy
- Known for: Painter
- Notable work: Il dettato (1891), La vaccinazione nelle campagne (1894), Dolori inattesi (1895)
- Movement: Verismo
- Patrons: Enrico Gamba, Andrea Gastaldi, Giovanni Tamone

Demetrio Cosola (9 September 1851 – 27 February 1895) was an Italian painter of Piedmontese verismo painting.

== Biography ==
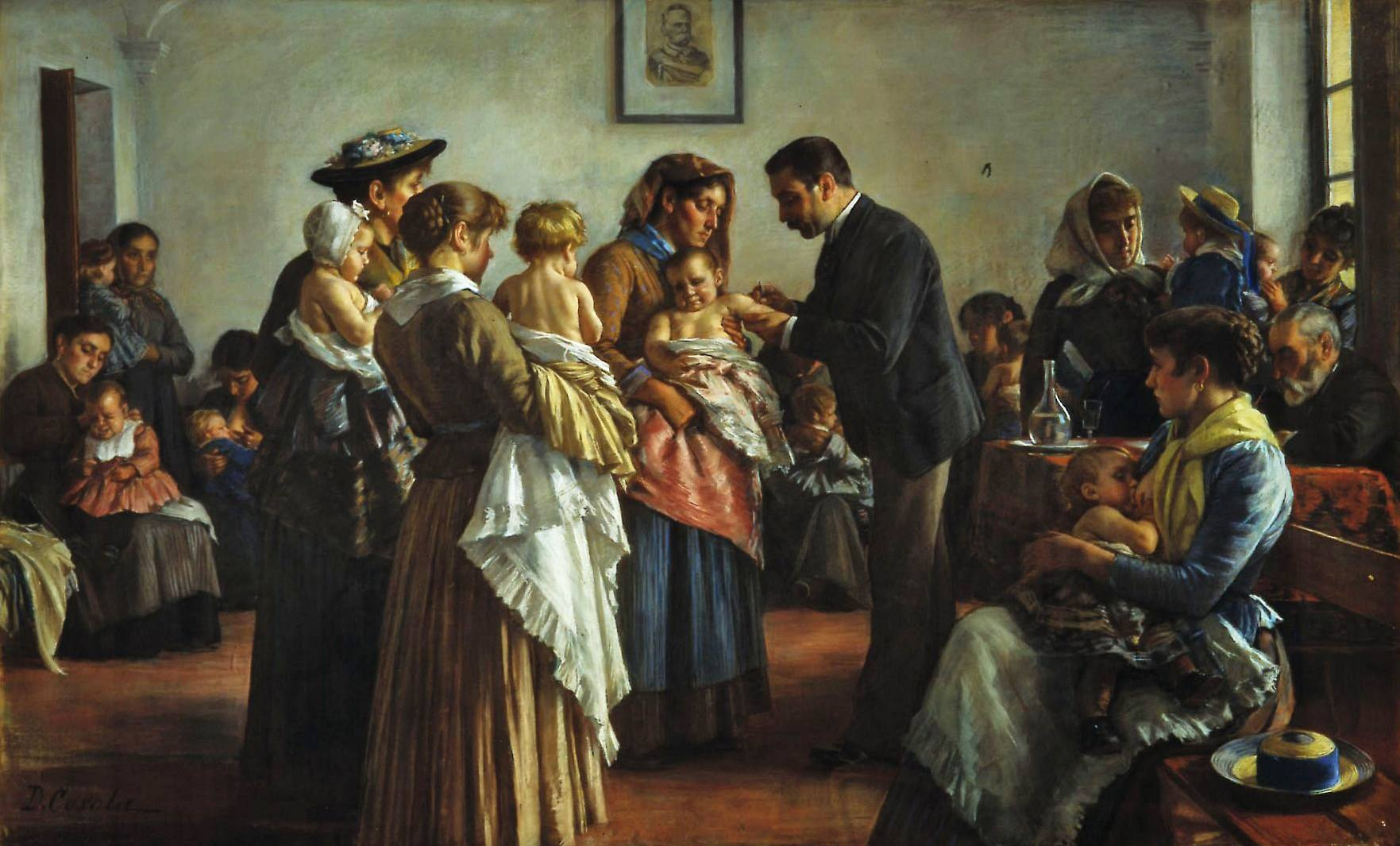
La vaccinazione nelle campagne (The vaccination in the Rural Areas, 1894)

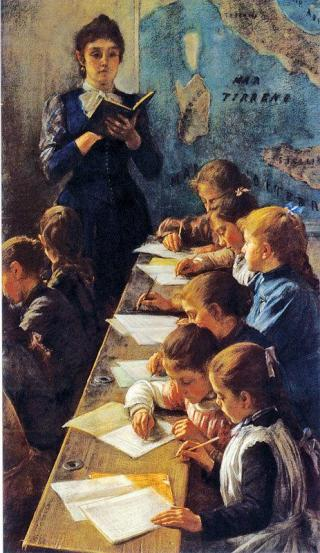
Il dettato (The Dictation Lesson, 1891)

Born in San Sebastiano da Po, he lived his entire life between Chivasso, where he moved with his family at the age of seven, and Turin.

At the age of 18, he began attending the Accademia Albertina. He studied under Enrico Gamba, Andrea Gastaldi, Giovanni Tamone, and became friends with another teacher, Antonio Fontanesi.

In 1873, he began to exhibit, but initially without great success.

In 1884, he returned to the Academy, as assistant teacher first to Gastaldi, then (after the latter's death in 1889) to Pier Celestino Gilardi.

He died in February 1895 of pneumonia.

Cosola was quite a prolific painter: despite his short life, there are about 200 landscapes, about 200 portraits and about a hundred paintings of other genres. His favorite subjects were nature and the everyday life of ordinary people, frequently including children.

Among his major works, Al sole (In the Sun, 1884) was housed in the Royal Palace of Turin, but was destroyed by a fire in 1997; Il dettato (The Dictation Lesson, 1891) is housed in the Turin Civic Gallery of Modern and Contemporary Art; Dolori inattesi (Unexpected Sorrows, 1895) is in Chivasso, in a private collection; La vaccinazione nelle campagne (The Vaccination in the Countryside, 1894) is also housed in Chivasso, in the Town Hall.
