= Achille Alberti =

Italian sculptor

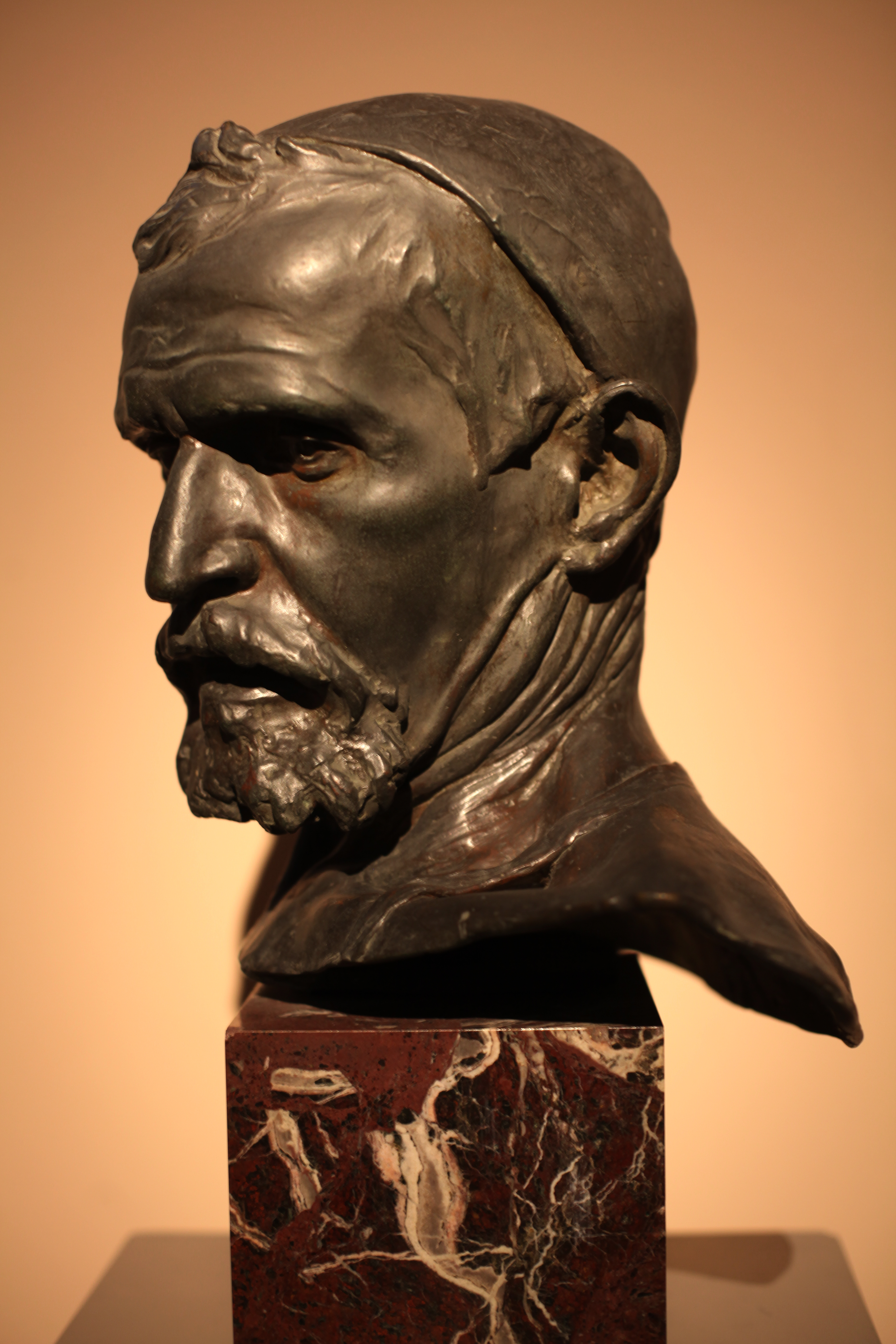
- Born: 12 March 1860; Milan, Kingdom of Lombardy–Venetia
- Died: 15 June 1943 (aged 83)
- Known for: Sculpture

Achille Alberti (12 March 1860 in Milan – 15 July 1943) was an Italian sculptor.

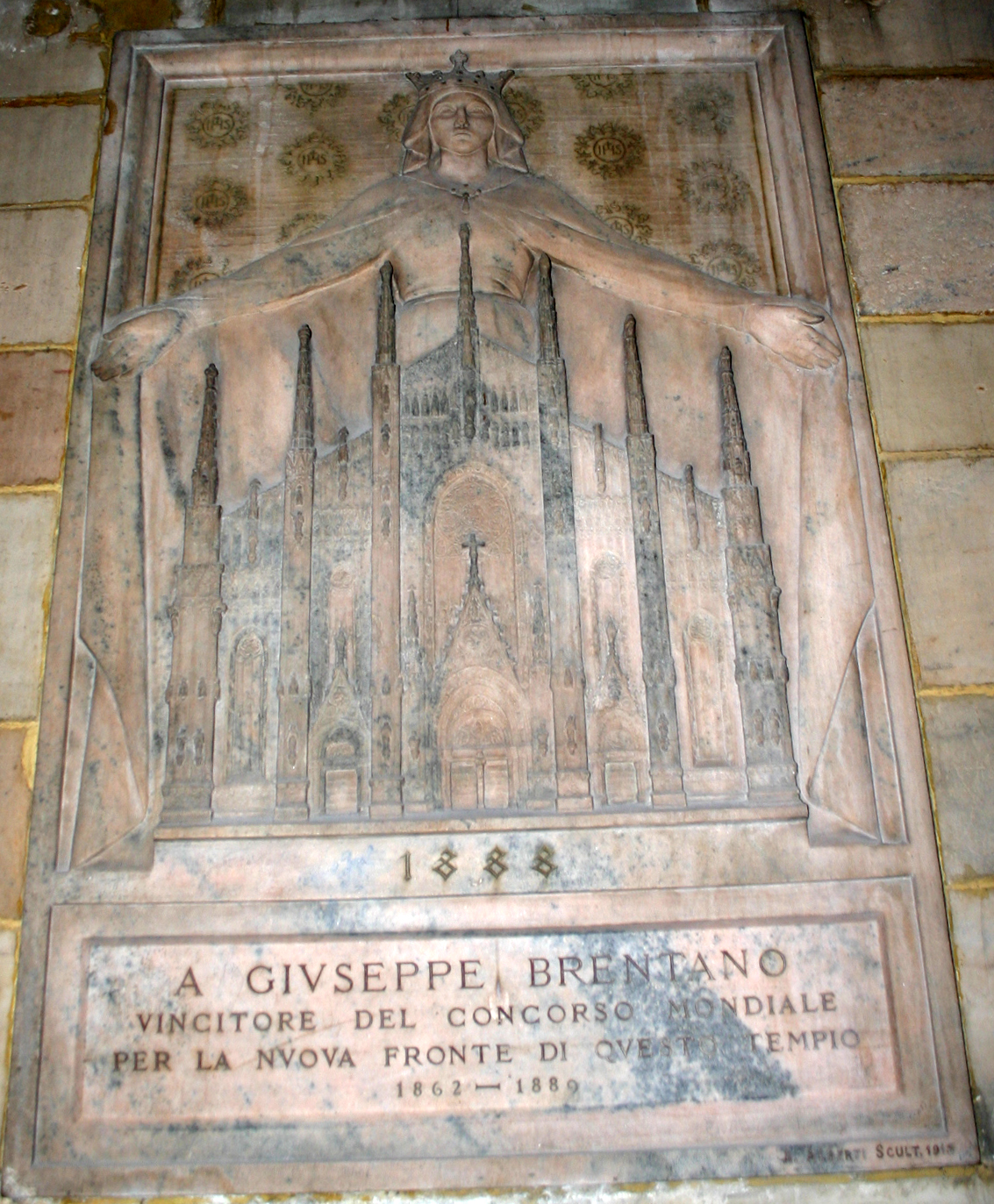
Funeral Monument for Giuseppe Brentano by Alberti. Note the Madonna della Misericordia, the symbol of the "Reverenda Fabbrica del Duomo of Milan".

== Biography ==
Born in Milan, where he completed his studies at the Brera Academy under Pietro Magni and Riccardo Ripamonti, he later taught sculpture at that Academy. Like the sculptor Achille D'Orsi, he often depicted genre subjects, but he also completed scenes from classical history. In 1885, he completed the works Il Catone Uticense and Vittime del lavoro.

His statuette, Il barcaiuolo, was exhibited in 1883, and the next year in Turin. He also completed the bronze statuary group Due giugno; Apoteosi (1886); Leda (1887, Mostra di Venice); a stucco Mater dolorosa (1888, Bologna); a bronze figurine of Il panattiere; and Maria, a marble bas-relief. At the Galleria d'Arte Moderna of Milan, a half dozen of his works are displayed: a bronze bas-relief of Pindar in the Theater of Athens (1891); a stucco bas-relief of Bathers (1891); a marble portrait of the poet Gian Pietro Lucini (1897); a marble bust of Maniscalco (1900); a bronze Virago (1907); and a bronze Bustino di Ragazzo (1910).
