= Orazio De Santis =

Italian engraver (1530–1584)

Orazio de Santis, also known as L'Aquilano (active 1568–1577), was an Italian engraver of the Renaissance period. He was probably born in L'Aquila. He made prints based on the designs of Pompeo Aquilano. He also produced 74 plates of antique statues in Rome, the joint work of Santis and Cherubino Alberti, published in 1584.
