= Vincenzo Cartari =

Italian mythographer, diplomat and Renaissance humanist

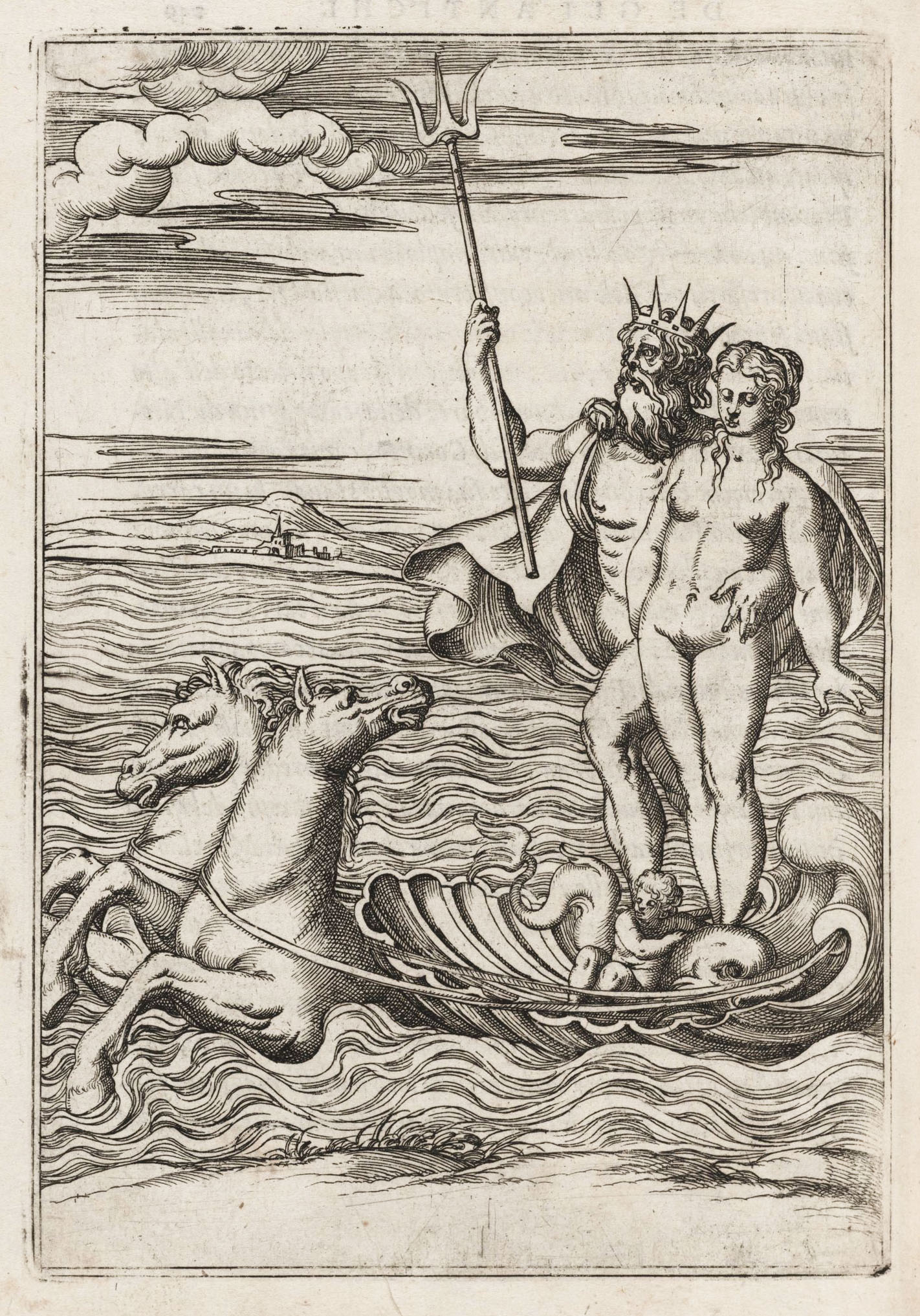
Illustration from Le imagini de i dei de gli antichi nelle qvali si contengono gl'idoli, riti, ceremonie, & altre cose appartenenti alla religione de gli antichi, 1571, by Vincenzo Cartari (Houghton Library)

Vincenzo Cartari (c. 1531 – 1590) was a mythographer, secretary, and diplomat of the Italian Renaissance, studied by Jean Seznec and scholars of the Warburg Institute.

Born in Reggio Emilia, he worked for Duke Alfonso II Este and the cardinals Ippolito II and Luigi II Este, in the courts of Ferrara, Venice, Tivoli (Rome), Fontainebleau, and Bruxelles.

== The Images of the Gods of the Ancients ==
As the first Italian translator of Ovid's I Fasti, a Latin poem about the gods and religious beliefs of the ancient Romans, Cartari gained a deep knowledge of the classical world and its myths.

After publishing the translation and commentary of his I Fasti, in 1551 and 1553, he authored the first mythographic handbook not written in Latin, but in Italian, thereby widening his readership.

Le Imagini con la sposizione dei dei de gli antichi (The Images of the Gods of the Ancients and their Explanations) was first published in Venice in 1556, and continuously enriched with illustrations – such as the woodcuts of the ancient gods by Giuseppe Porta Salviati and Bolognino Zaltieri.

Notes and translations in other languages had been added by the same author and others, for at least 150 years.

== Iconographic focus on Classical myths ==
Cartari also chose an unedited special focus on ekphrastic descriptions and visual iconography of the various gods, presented through an informative gallery of identifying epiphanies, triumphs, clothing, expressions, poses, attributes, ceremonies, and legends.

Although inspired by the more traditional and vast works of Lilio Gregorio Giraldi (De deis gentium varia et multiplex historia, 1548), Giovanni Boccaccio (Genealogie Deorum Gentilium, second part of 14th century), and Classical literature and comments, Cartari invented a new, visual approach to antiquity.

As a result, his Le Imagini had considerable influence on both artists – starting from Paolo Veronese – and on antiquarians and art writers, like Gian Paolo Lomazzo and Cesare Ripa with its encyclopedic Iconologia (1593).

== Lorenzo Pignoria ==
The antiquarian and egyptologist Lorenzo Pignoria added some important notes in 1615 and 1624. In particular, his appendix Seconda Parte delle Imagini de gli Dei Indiani displays detailed illustrations of some archeological remains portraying Mexican, Egyptian, Indian and Japanese gods, seeking a sort of unique visual language in pre-Christian religions.

In his Teutschen Academie Joachim von Sandrart writes of his respect for Cartari's work, which Sandrart republished in translation in 1680 with new illustrations.

== Editions ==
- V. Cartari, Le imagini de i dei de gli antichi, edited by G. Auzzas, F. Martignago, M. Pastore Stocchi, P. Rigo, Vicenza, Neri Pozza, 1996
- V. Cartari, Le immagini degli dei di Vincenzo Cartari, edited by C. Volpi, Roma, De Luca, 1996
- V. Cartari, Imagini delli dèi de gl’antichi, edited by A. Grossato, Milano, Luni, 2004
- V. Cartari, Images of the Gods of the Ancients: the First Italian Mythography, edited by J. Mulryan, Tempe, ACMRS, 2012

== Studies ==
- E. Calderoni, Raccontare gli Antichi. Le Imagini di Vincenzo Cartari, Roma, Aracne, 2017
- M. Palma, Vincenzo Cartari, in Dizionario Biografico degli Italiani Treccani: CARTARI, Vincenzo in "Dizionario Biografico"
- J. Seznec, The Survival of the Pagan Gods: The Mythological Tradition and Its Place in Renaissance Humanism and Art, Princeton, Princeton University Press, 1972
- Vincenzo Cartari e le direzioni del mito nel Cinquecento, edited by S. Maffei, Roma, Gbe, 2013
- C. Volpi, Le vecchie e le nuove illustrazioni delle Immagini degli dei degli antichi di Vincenzo Cartari, in «Storia dell’arte», 1992, n. 74, pp. 48–80
- C. Volpi, Lorenzo Pignoria e i suoi corrispondenti, in «Nouvelles de la Republique des Lettres», 1992, n. II, pp. 71–128
