= Alessandro Alberti =

Italian painter

Alessandro Alberti (9 March 1551 – 10 July 1596) was an Italian painter of the Renaissance period.

== Biography ==
He was born at Borgo San Sepolcro, the eldest son of Alberto Alberti, and brother of the painters Giovanni and Cherubino Alberti. He trained with Gaspero di Silvestre of Perugia. In 1566, Alessandro's uncle Lodovico took him to Rome, where he subsequently much in conjunction with his brothers. He died at Rome, while engaged on the great work of decorating the Sala Clementina for Pope Clement VIII. Alessandro also worked at Borgo San Sepolcro, Naples, and
