= Achille D'Orsi =

Italian sculptor

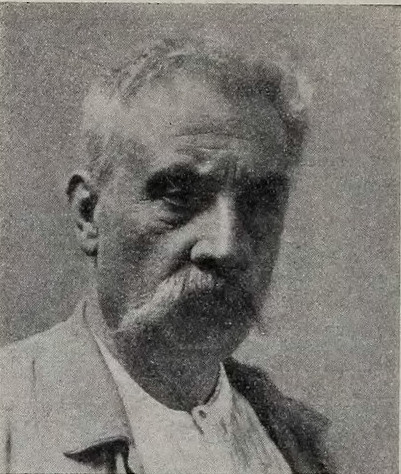
- Born: 6 August 1845; Naples, Italy
- Died: 8 February 1929; Naples
- Education: Accademia di Belle Arti di Napoli; Tito Angelini
- Known for: sculpture
- Movement: Verismo

Achille D'Orsi (6 August 1845 – 8 February 1929) was an Italian sculptor from Naples. Like his Neapolitan contemporary, Vincenzo Gemito, he worked in the Verismo style of Realism.
