= Lucía Alberti =

Argentine politician

Lucía N. Alberti (born 13 December 1944), is an Argentine radical feminist and politician. She is a leader of the Unión Cívica Radical (UCR).

She was a national deputy for the Unión Cívica Radical (1985-1989), leader of the Permanent Assembly for Human Rights, and president of the association Mujeres por la Paz, el Desarrollo y la Igualdad ("Women for Peace, Development, and Equality"). She is currently president of the Asociaciones pro Naciones Unidas de América Latina.

== Life ==
From mid-1971 to December 1975, she was a member of the Capital Committee of Juventud Radical Revolucionaria ("Radical Revolutionary Youth", JRR). She was one of the leaders of the Juventud Radical Trabajadora ("Radical Working Youth") within the JRR. The JRR was the only organization that was neither communist nor Peronist that appeared on the first Alianza Anticomunista Argentina blacklist. Because it appeared on the blacklist, the JRR had to be dissolved.

When, in September 1983 near the end of the National Reorganization Process (1976-1983), a bomb was placed in the headquarters of the newspaper El Porteño, Alberti wrote a letter of support for the newspaper.

In that period, Alberti founded the Asociación pro Naciones Unidas de Argentina (ANUA). Through this organization, she has organized hundreds of interdisciplinary conferences over the decades, centered on topics such as new feminism and human trafficking in Argentina.

With the return of democracy, she obtained a minor political position: she was named administrator of La Chacarita Cemetery.

From 1985 to 1989 she was a national deputy, nominated by the National Coordinating Committee of the Unión Cívica Radical, together with Jorge Vanossi, Norma Allegrone de Ponte, Marcelo Stubrin, Carlos Bello, José Domingo Canata, y Ariel Puebla.

Until September 2000 she was the general director of the City of Buenos Aires Center for Civic Control and Participation.

She is a member of the group Another World is Possible.
