= Dictated but not read =

Phrase used at end of writing

"Dictated but not read" is a phrase used at the end of a text to warn that the written material has not been personally written or verified by the author. The material may have been dictated to a secretary when the author had no time to proofread or edit it.

This practice is common within the medical community, though its appropriateness is still debated.

== Usage ==
The phrase is used to indicate a need for extra care in reading the document so annotated. It may be intended as a disclaimer to limit legal liability.

It may be used at the end of an article to warn the reader that the written material has not been personally written by the author, who likely dictated it to a secretary, but they did not have the time to write it themselves. Very busy people may be expected to sign off their article with such notation. However, it may be regarded as disrespectful, especially when the writer is deemed not busy.

It is commonly used to sign off on correspondence where formality takes a backseat to speedy communications, or where such correspondence is routine. When this is not the case, it may be a discourtesy to the recipient of the letter.
