= Turin Civic Gallery of Modern and Contemporary Art =

Museum in Turin, Italy

Coordinates: 45.0648°N 7.6693°E

GAM Turin Civic Gallery of Modern and Contemporary Art
- Galleria civica d'arte moderna e contemporanea di Torino
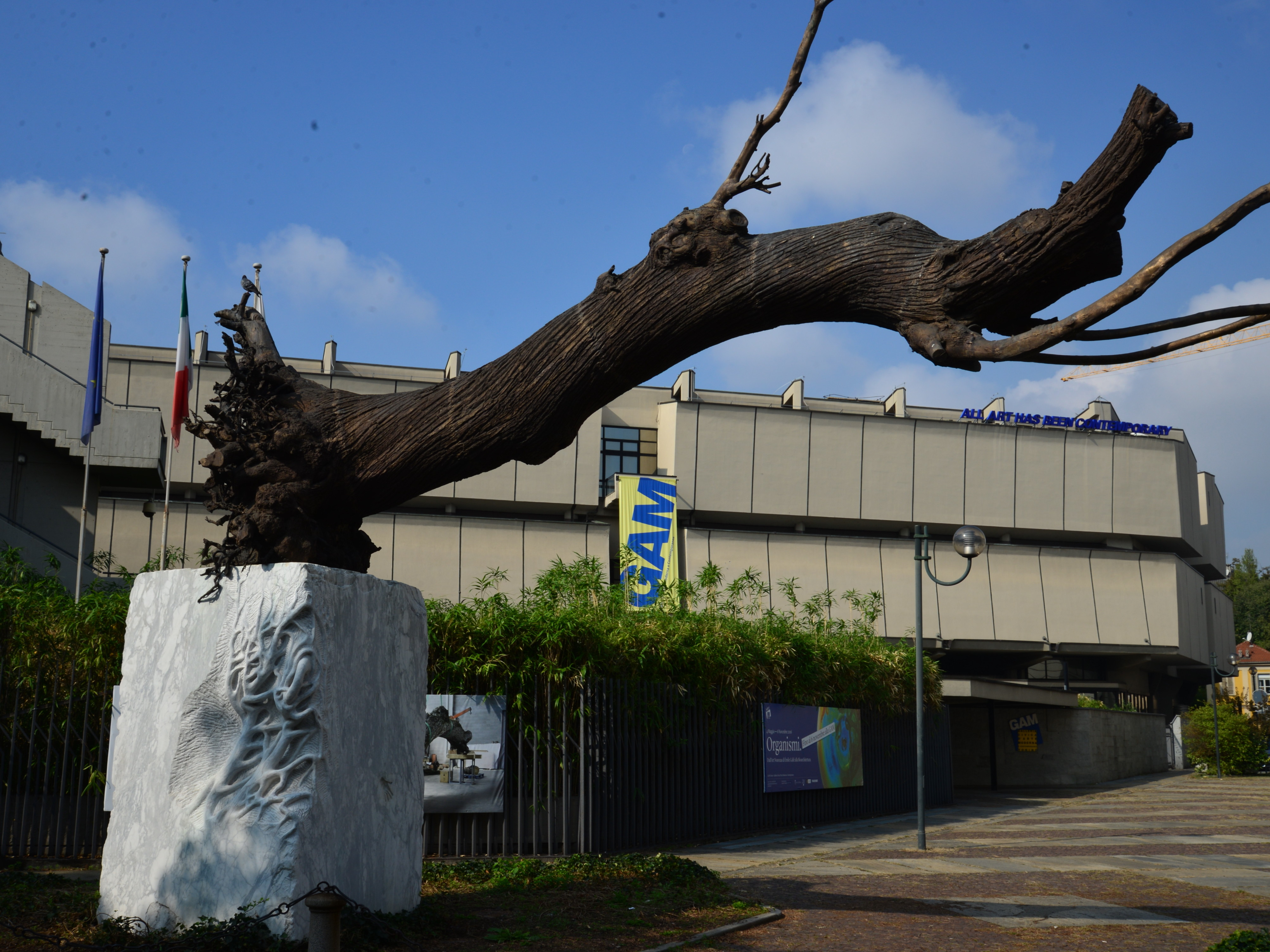
- Established: 1895
- Location: 31 via Magenta, Turin, Italy
- Type: Art museum
- Collections: Modern and contemporary art
- Director: Riccardo Passoni
- Architect: Carlo Bassi e Goffredo Boschetti
- Website: www.gamtorino.it/it

The Turin Civic Gallery of Modern and Contemporary Art (Italian - Galleria civica d'arte moderna e contemporanea di Torino or GAM Torino) is an art gallery in Turin, Italy, founded in 1891-1895 and located in 31 via Magenta. With the MAO (Museo d'arte orientale), Palazzo Madama e Casaforte degli Acaja (Museo civico d'arte antica), the Borgo and the Rocca medioevali, it forms part of the Fondazione Torino Musei. The lower rooms house important reviews and a large collection of video art.

It houses the city's permanent collections of 19th and 20th century art, which consist of over 47,000 paintings, sculptures, art installations and pieces of video art. Artists represented include Antonio Canova, Giovanni Fattori, Giuseppe Pellizza da Volpedo, Antonio Mancini, Giacomo Balla, Paul Klee, Amedeo Modigliani, Pablo Picasso, Andy Warhol, Giorgio de Chirico, Lucio Fontana, Nino Franchina and Domenico Valinotti.

== History ==
The city's collection of modern art began with the founding of the Museo Civico in 1863, making it the first city in Italy to promote a modern art collection. It was housed with the earlier works in a building near the Mole Antonelliana, before being exhibited in a pavilion on corso Siccardi (now corso Galileo Ferraris) from 1895 until that building's destruction by Allied bombing in 1942.

A new building by Carlo Bassi and Goffredo Boschetti was built on the same site and opened in 1959. The modern art collection was housed on two floors of the new building at the request of director Vittorio Viale. In the 1980s the palazzo was declared unfit for use and only reopened in July 1993 after a long restoration programme. In 2009 the collection was reorganised thematically (Views, Genres, Childhood and Mirroring) rather than chronologically. It was reorganised again around the themes Infinity, Speed, Ethics and Nature in 2013 to mark the collection's 150th anniversary.

== Gallery ==
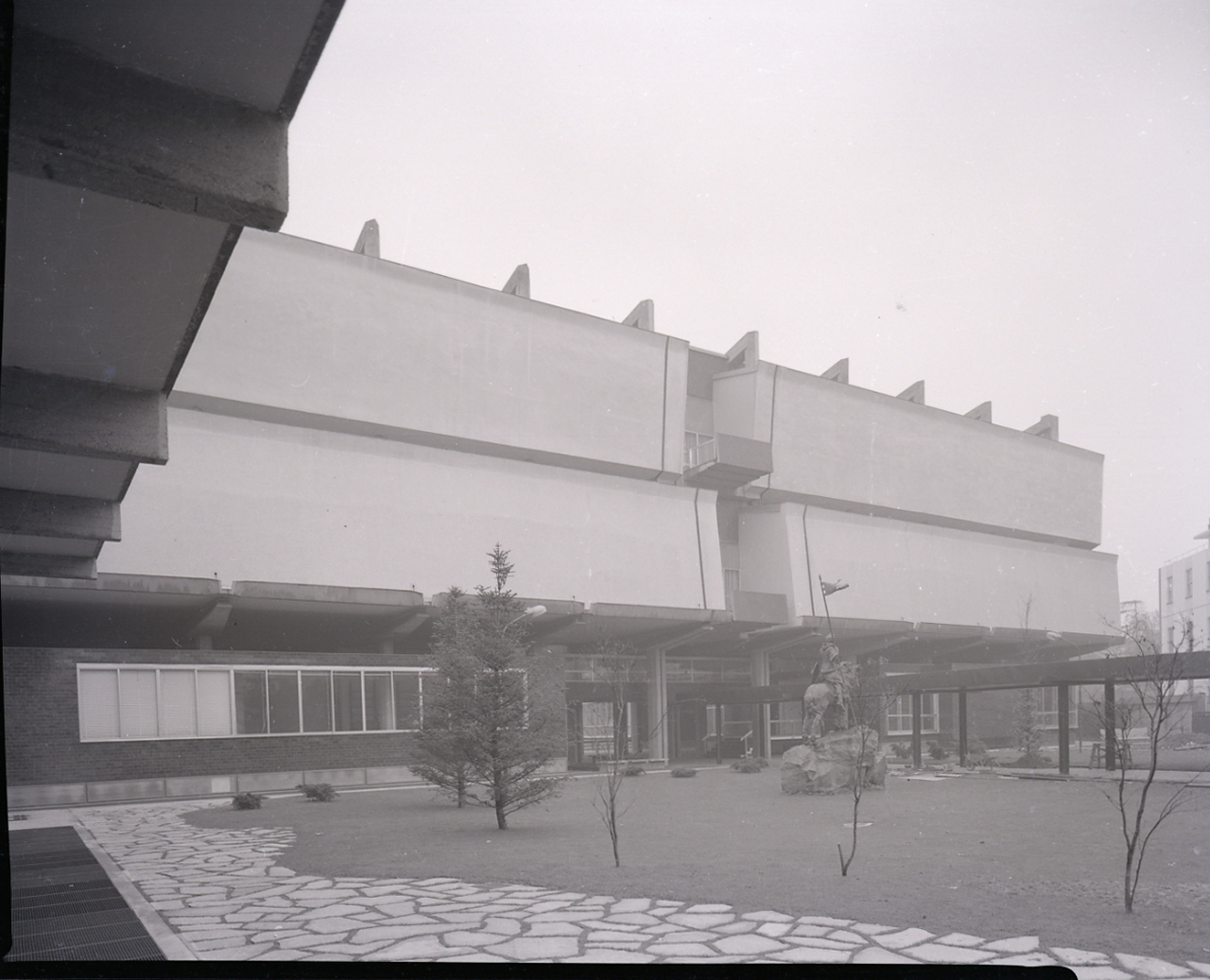
The building in 1959

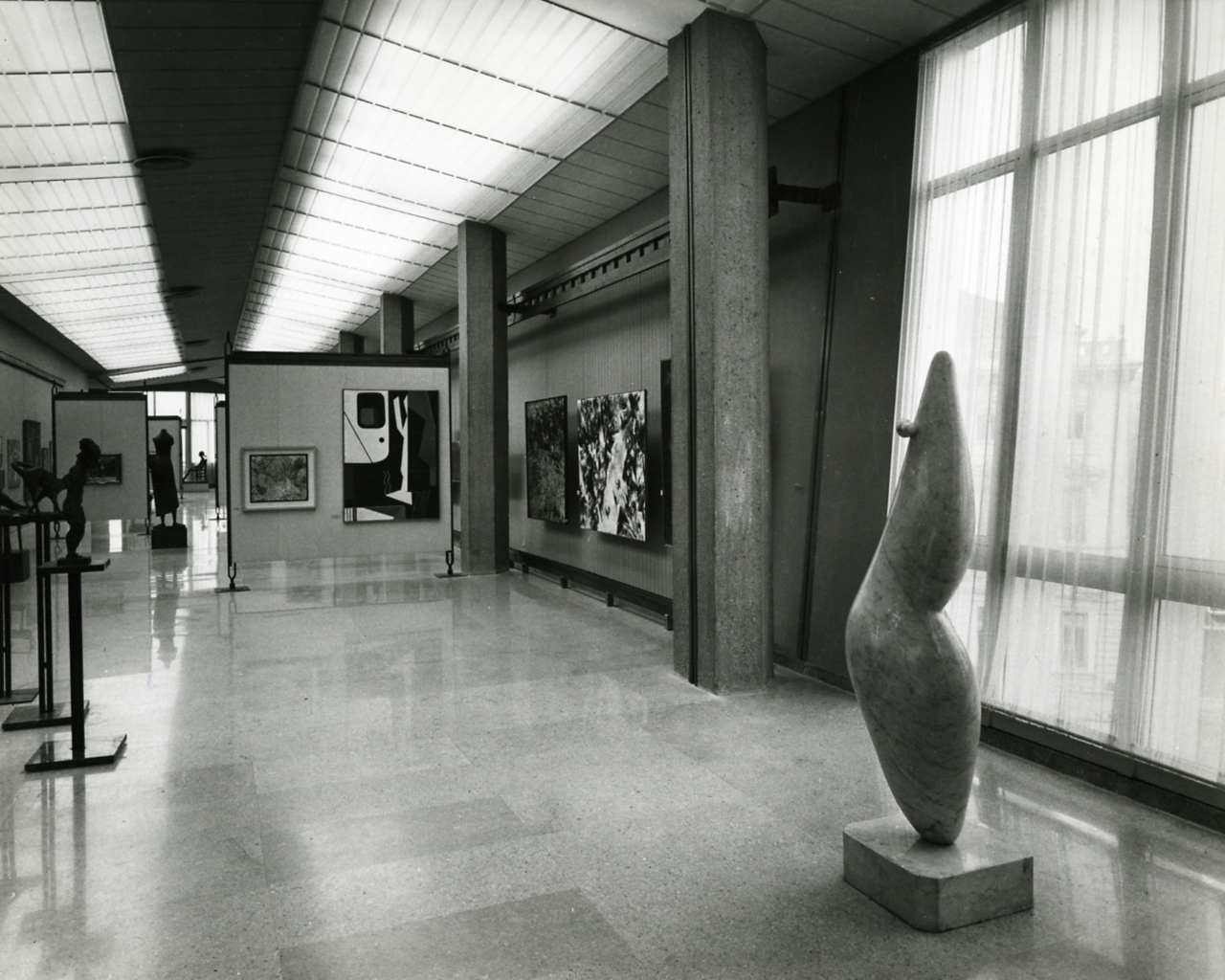
Gallery, 1959

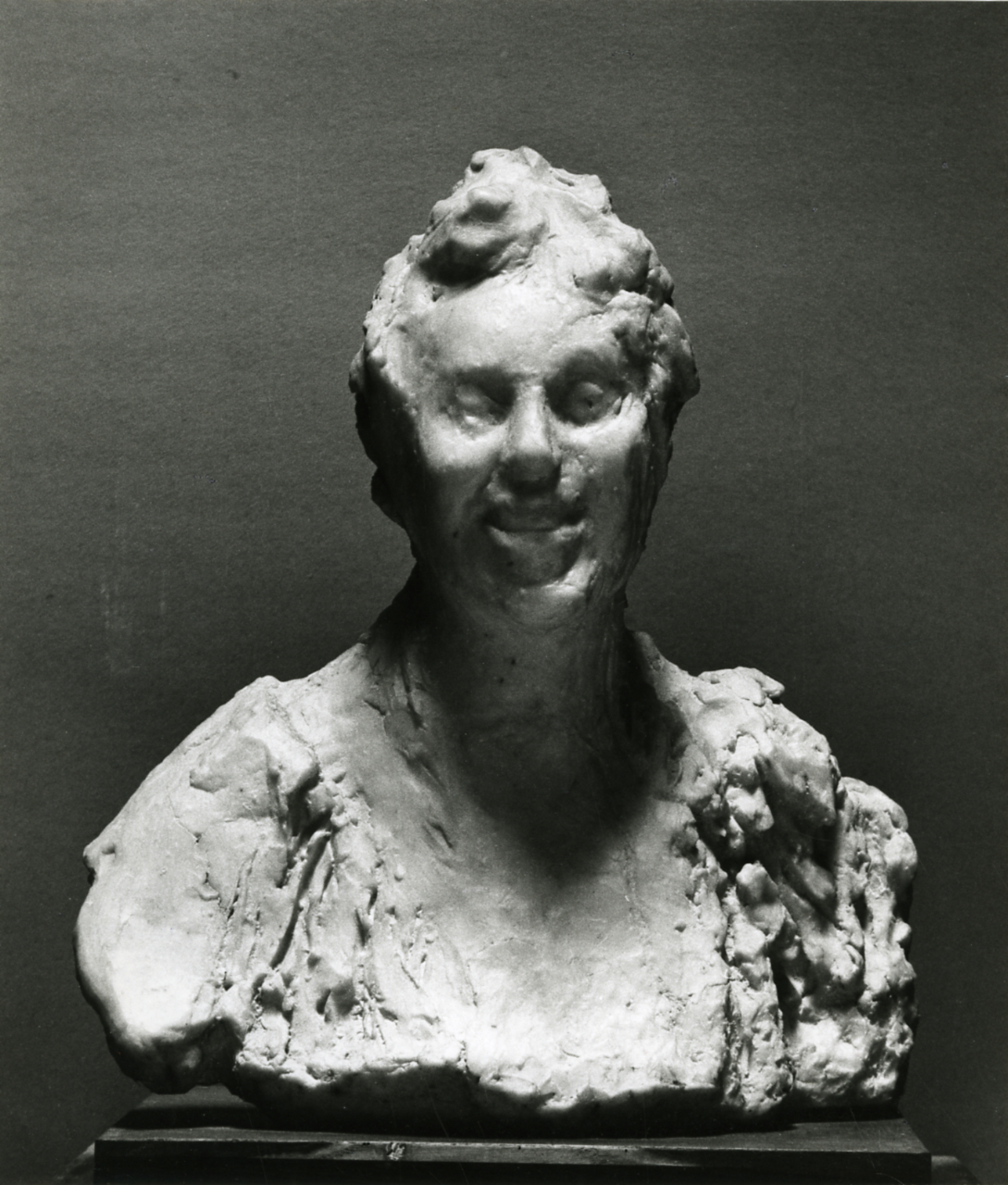
Sculpture by Medardo Rosso

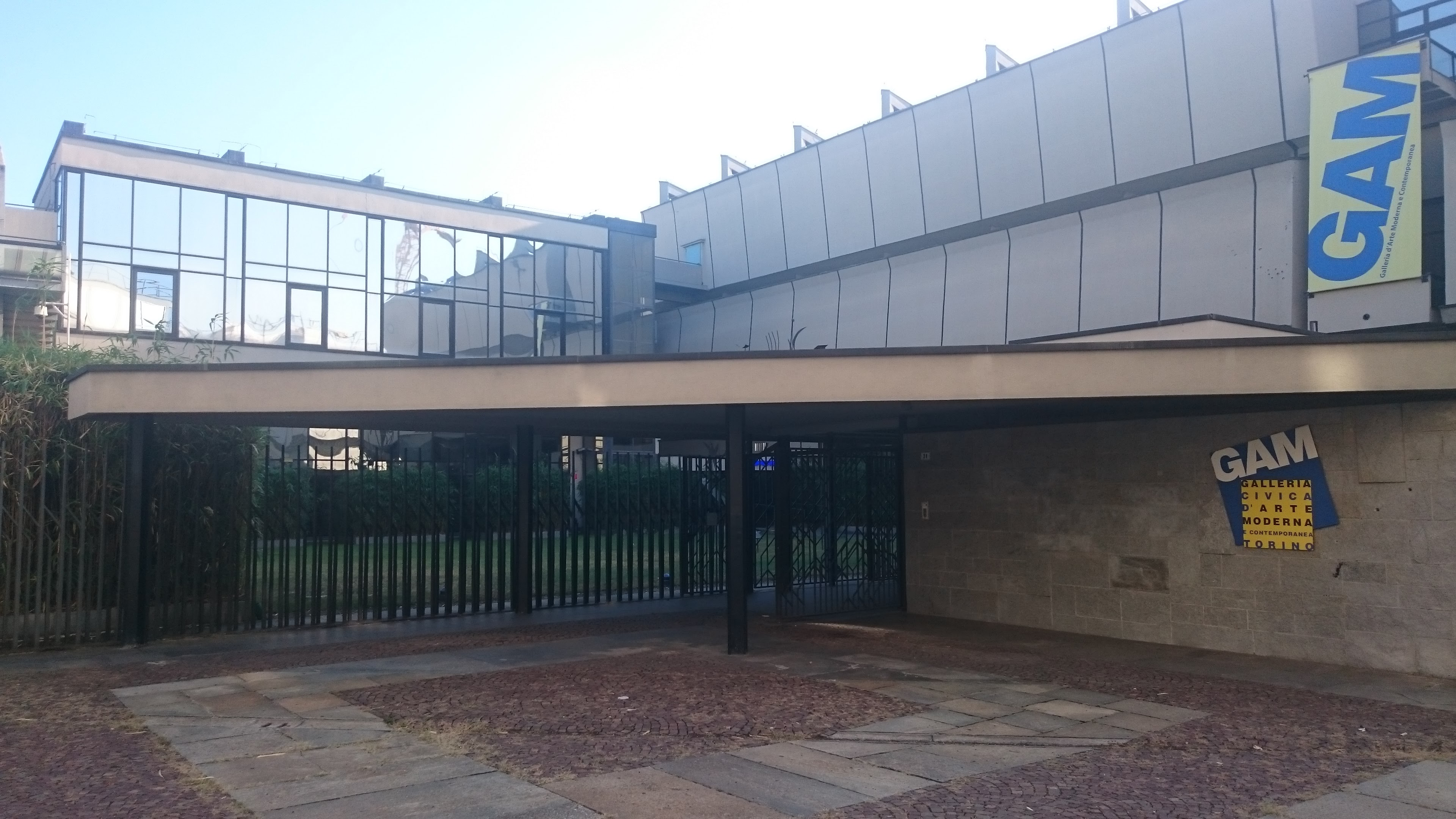
Entrance to the museum
