= Michael Alberti =

German physician and theologian (1682–1757)

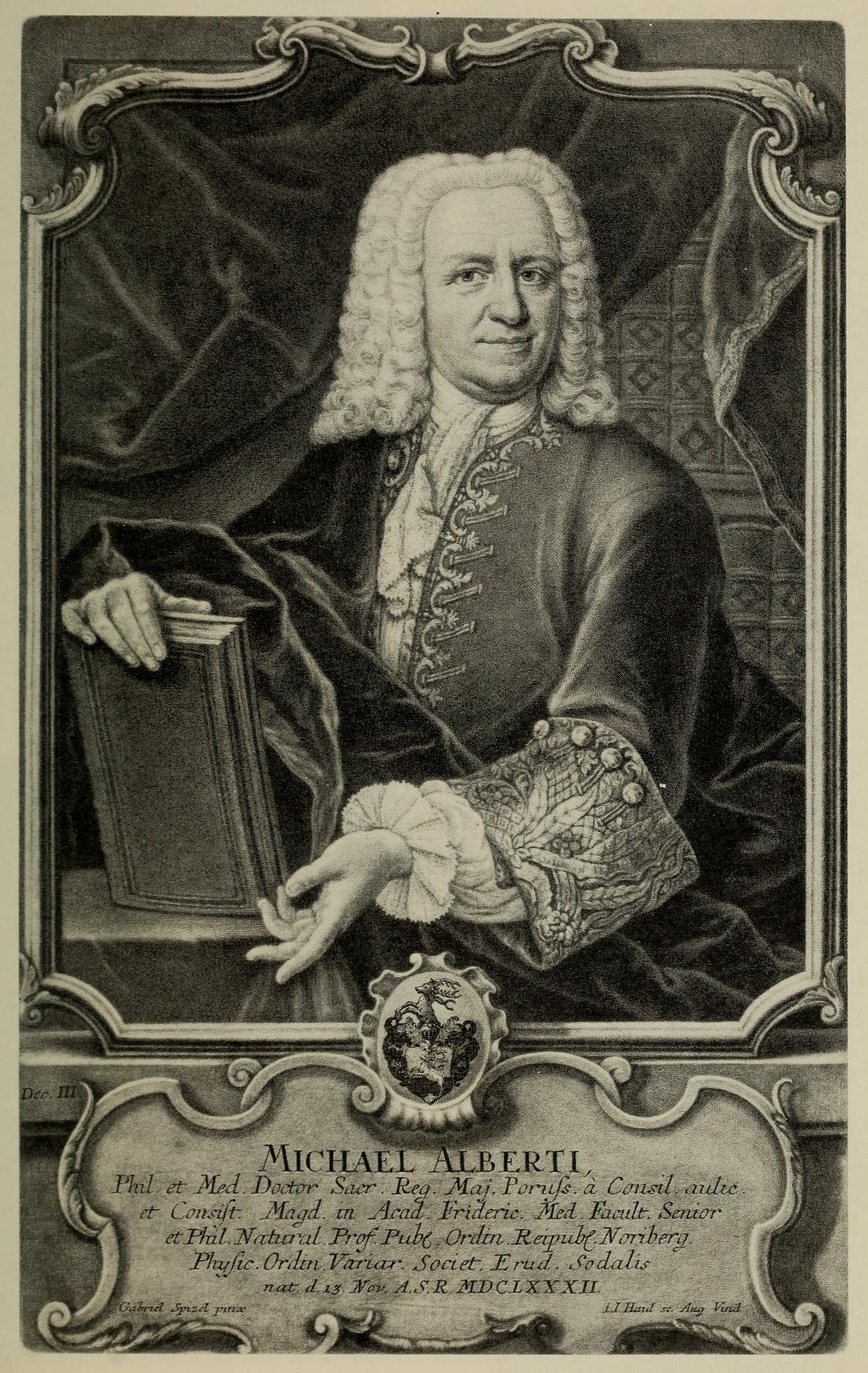

Michael Alberti (13 November 1682 – 17 May 1757) was a German pietist physician and theologian. Alberti became an ardent follower of Stahl's school of medical theory which considered the soul as having control on the body. Therapies involved dealing with the internal senses and feelings. Along with his students he produced nearly 300 dissertations.

== Life and work ==
Alberti was born in Nuremberg where his father Paul Martin was Protestant preacher. A brother Paul Martin (d. 1729) served as Archdeacon of Hersbruck while another, August (d. 1738) served as Archdeacon of St. Lorenz. Alberti also trained for the clergy at Altdorf and in 1701 he published Modum dirigendi omnes actiones nostras ad gloriam Dei ("The Way to Direct All Our Actions to the Glory of God"). He then moved to Jena where he studied medicine and was influenced by Georg Wolfgang Wedel, the teacher of Georg Ernst Stahl. Stahl's teaching contrasted the iatromechanistic approaches that were in their infancy at the time. Stahl emphasized a holistic approach to body and soul and Stahlian medicine emphasised the soul as having control on the body. Alberti became an ardent follower of Stahl and received a doctorate in 1704. Several of his works dealt with the topics of longevity, particularly the vitalist medical model that opposed the Cartesian iatromechanical model developed by Friedrich Hoffmann and Herman Boerhaave. In 1710 he became an associate professor of medicine and became a full professor at Halle in 1716 just as Stahl moved to Berlin to serve as physician to Prussian King Frederick William I. Here he supervised more than 300 dissertations on medical topics.
