= Giovanni Alberti (painter) =

Italian painter

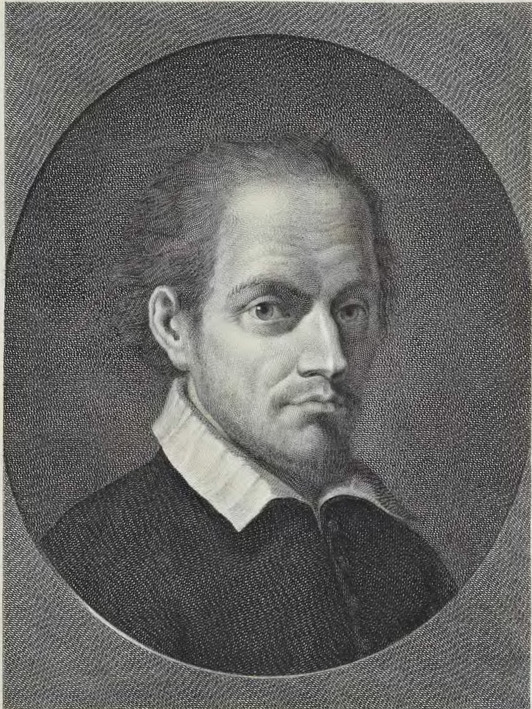
- Born: 19 October 1558; Sansepolcro
- Died: 10 August 1601; Rome
- Occupation: Painter
- Father: Alberto Alberti
- Relatives: Alessandro Alberti, Cherubino Alberti

Giovanni Alberti (1558–1601) was an Italian painter, known for his perspective painting (quadratura). He was also a poet and writer about art critic.

== Biography ==
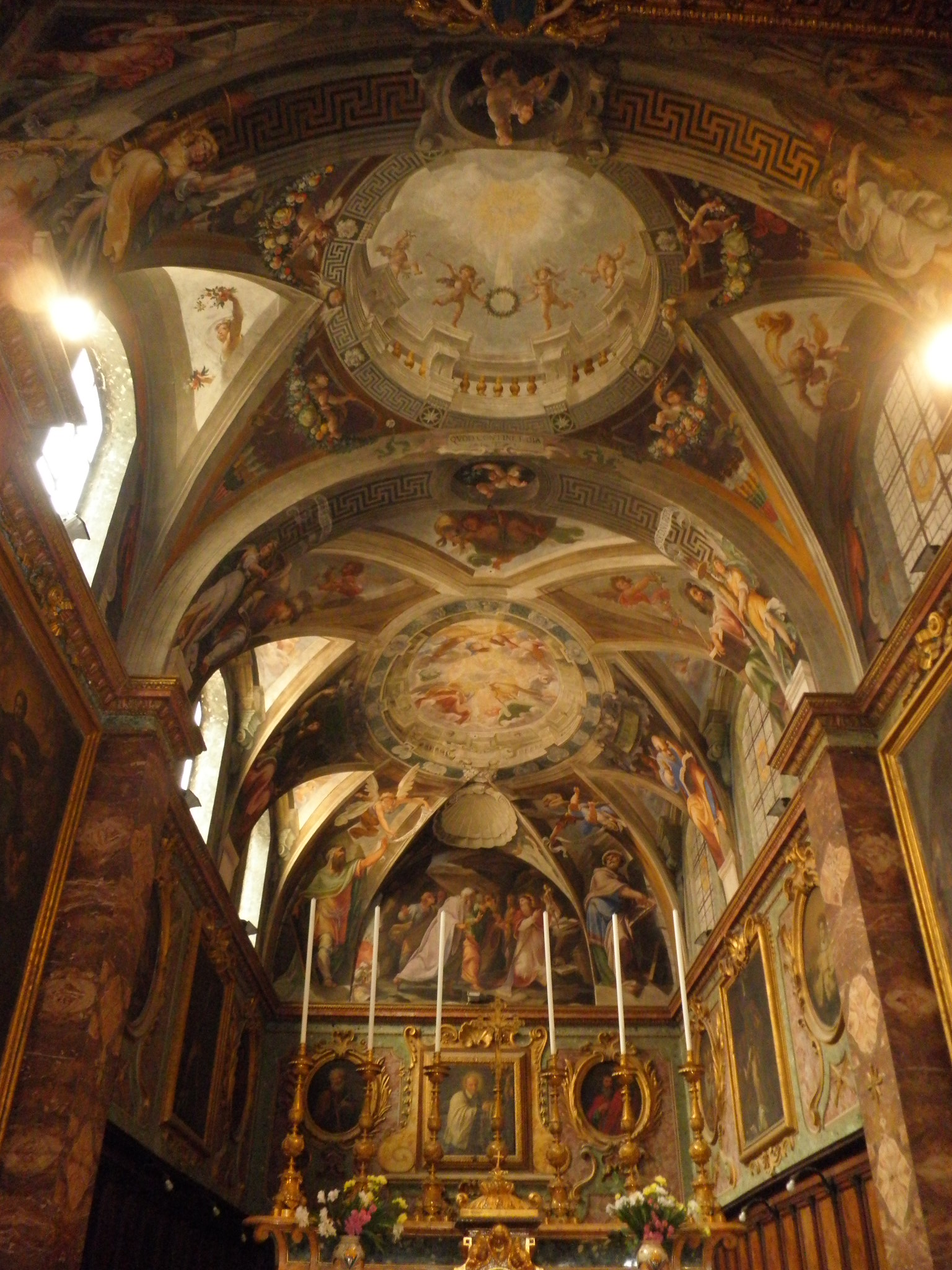
San Silvestro al Quirinale with frescoes by Giovanni Alberti and his brother Cherubino

The brother of Alessandro and Cherubino Alberti, and third son of Alberto, he was born at Borgo S. Sepolcro in Rome.

He went to Rome during the papacy of Gregory XIII, who employed him in the papal palace on Monte Cavallo, and in the Vatican. He excelled in painting landscapes and perspective, in which the figures were usually painted by Cherubino. He was also employed by Clement VIII, to paint the sacristy of St. John of Lateran, and, in conjunction with his brothers, to decorate the Sala Clementina in the Vatican. For this work, which was commenced in 1595 and completed in 1598, the two painters (Alessandro had died during the course of execution) received 3050 scudi. In the 1590s Giovanni and Cherubino painted frescoes in the Capella Maggiore of San Silvestro al Quirinale, where the complex perspectival effects include a trompe-l'œil oculus above the altar.

Alberti also worked in his native town, in Mantua, Perugia, Florence, and elsewhere. He died at Rome in 1601. His portrait is placed in the academy of St Luke, and another in the Uffizi at Florence.
