= Alberto Alberti =

Italian painter

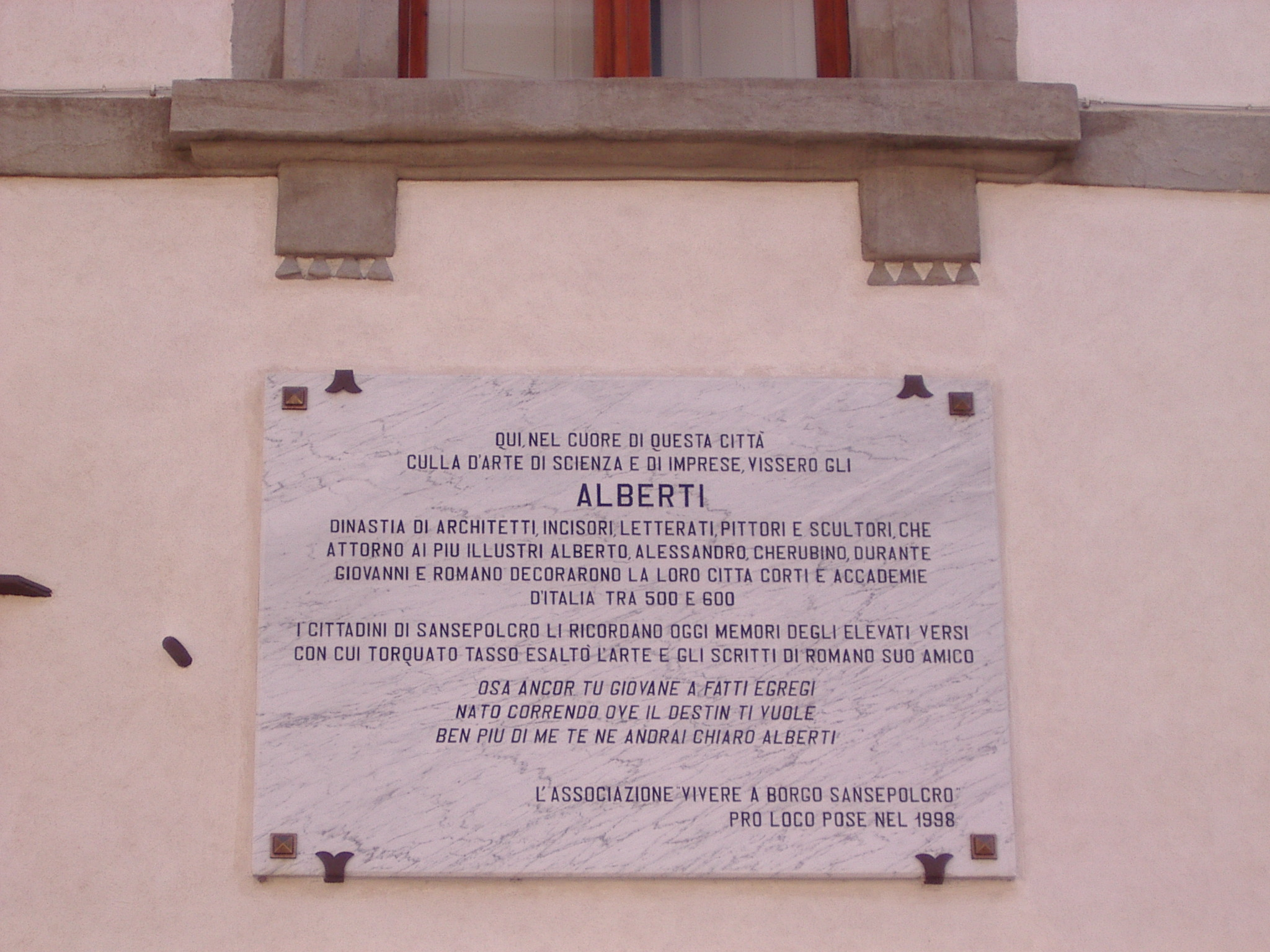
Plaque to him in Sansepolcro.

Alberto Alberti (1525 or 1526, Borgo Sansepolcro, Tuscany, Italy – 1598 or 1599, Rome) was an Italian wood carver, architect, painter and diarist. His name also appears as Alberto di Giovanni Alberti and Berto di San Sepolcro. His three sons Alessandro, Giovanni and Cherubino (1533–1615) were all painters.
