= Clementine Hall =

State hall in the Apostolic Palace, Vatican City

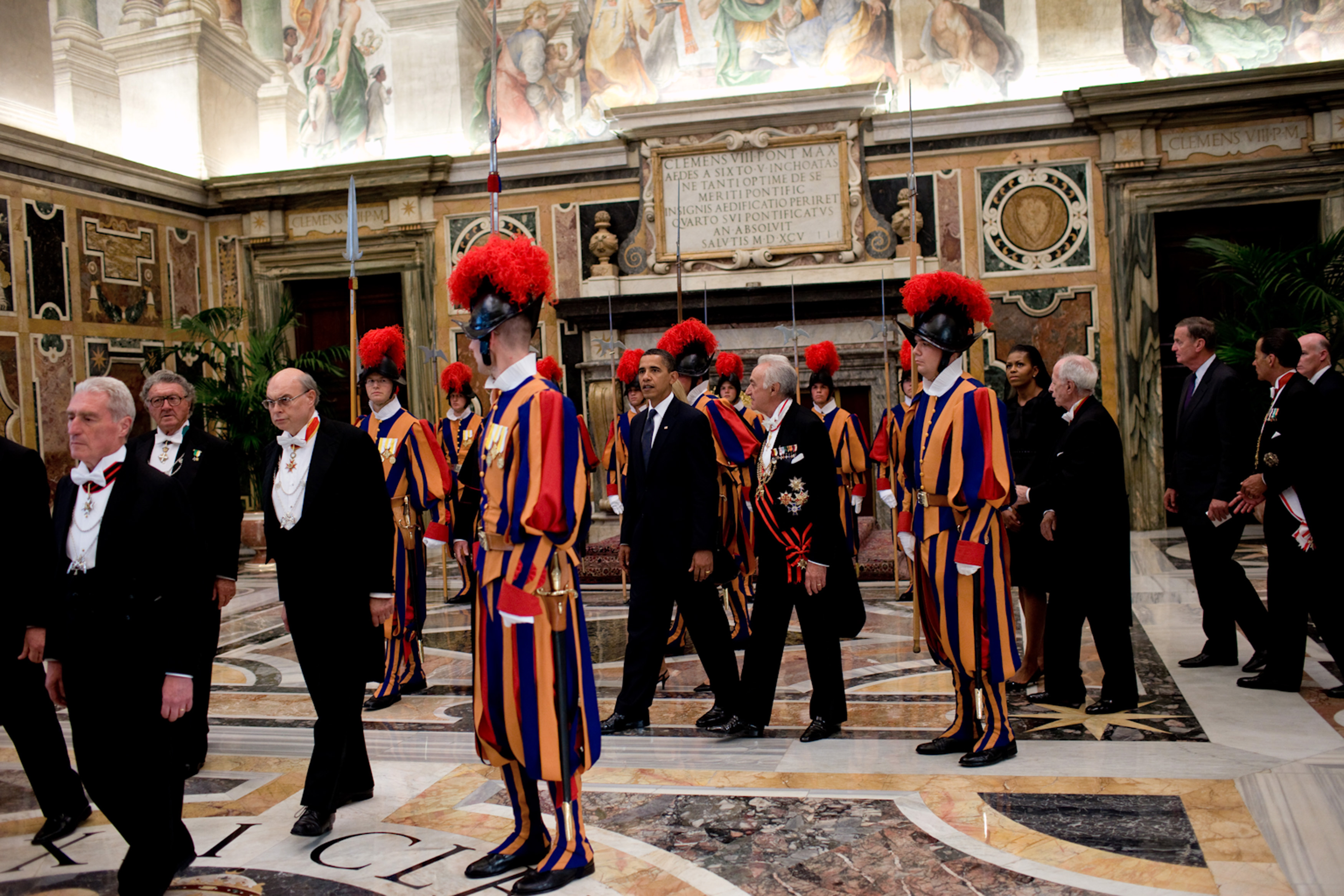
President Barack Obama escorted through the Clementine Hall after his meeting with Pope Benedict XVI

The Clementine Hall, called the Sala Clementina, is a hall of the Apostolic Palace near St. Peter's Basilica in Vatican City. It was established in the 16th century by Pope Clement VIII in honor of St Clement, the third successor of St. Peter. The Clementine Hall is covered in Renaissance frescoes and valuable works of art. It is used by the pope as a reception room and in some cases, site of various ceremonies and rituals. The Clementine Hall is the chamber in which the body of the pope lies for private visitation by officials of the Vatican upon death, as happened during the funeral of Pope John Paul II. The pope's body is then traditionally moved from the Clementine Hall and ceremonially carried across St. Peter's Square to St. Peter's Basilica or the Basilica of San Giovanni in Laterano.

== Design ==
The Sala Clementina, Clementine Hall, was commissioned by Pope Clement VIII in honor of his predecessor St Clement, the third in line as pope after St. Peter. It was constructed as part of the Apostolic Palace to the design of architect Domenico Fontana. The hall was originally envisaged as a series of rooms encompassing three floors, but Fontana's successor, Taddeo Landini, instead took away the second and third stories to create the hall. The brothers Cherubino and Giovanni were contracted in 1596 to complete the frescos that adorn the ceiling and walls. The ceiling was completed in 1600 and the walls in 1602.

== Description ==
The Clementine Hall measures 23 by 14.4 m (75 by 47 ft). It is lit by two windows that are mounted high up on the walls. It is illustrated with Renaissance frescoes. The vault is covered in a fresco by Giovanni Alberti titled “The Apotheosis of St. Clement", which includes a kneeling St Clement surrounded by angels. The vault includes examples of illusionistic ceiling painting, including quadratatura and di sotto in sù.The long walls have a high dado that is encrusted with marbles. Along one the walls are figures representing the cardinal, faced by the theological virtues lining the other wall, although Charity is replaced by Heroism, representing the attributes of martyrdom. On one of the short walls, above the doors, appears the fresco "The Martyrdom of St Clement" by the Dutch painter Paul Bril. In it, the saint is shown being thrown off a ship with an anchor tied to his neck. The other wall has the frescos "The Baptism of St. Clement" and "Allegory of Art and Science". Although the latter is by the Alberti brothers, the other frescos on the walls are the work of Cherubino Alberti and Baldassare Croce, Giovani having died in 1601 before the work was complete.

== Use ==
Used as a reception room by the pope, the Clementine Hall also performs a number of ceremonial functions. It is frequently used for state visits, including one on 4 June 2004, in which President of the United States George W. Bush presented Pope John Paul II with the Presidential Medal of Freedom. Often visitors will wait in the Hall for an audience with the pope, watched over by Swiss Guards. The Swiss Guard have been posted in the hall since before 1758.

The Clementine Hall is the chamber in which the body of the pope lies for private visitation by officials upon death. The body can be exposed to high temperatures as the room is not air conditioned and it is therefore often lightly embalmed to preserve its features. For the funeral of Pope John Paul II, the pope's body was laid in state from 3 to 4 April 2005, after which it was processed across St. Peter's Square to St. Peter's Basilica for public visitation until the funeral on 8 April.

== See also ==
- Index of Vatican City-related articles
