= Cherubino Alberti =

Italian engraver and painter

Cherubini Alberti
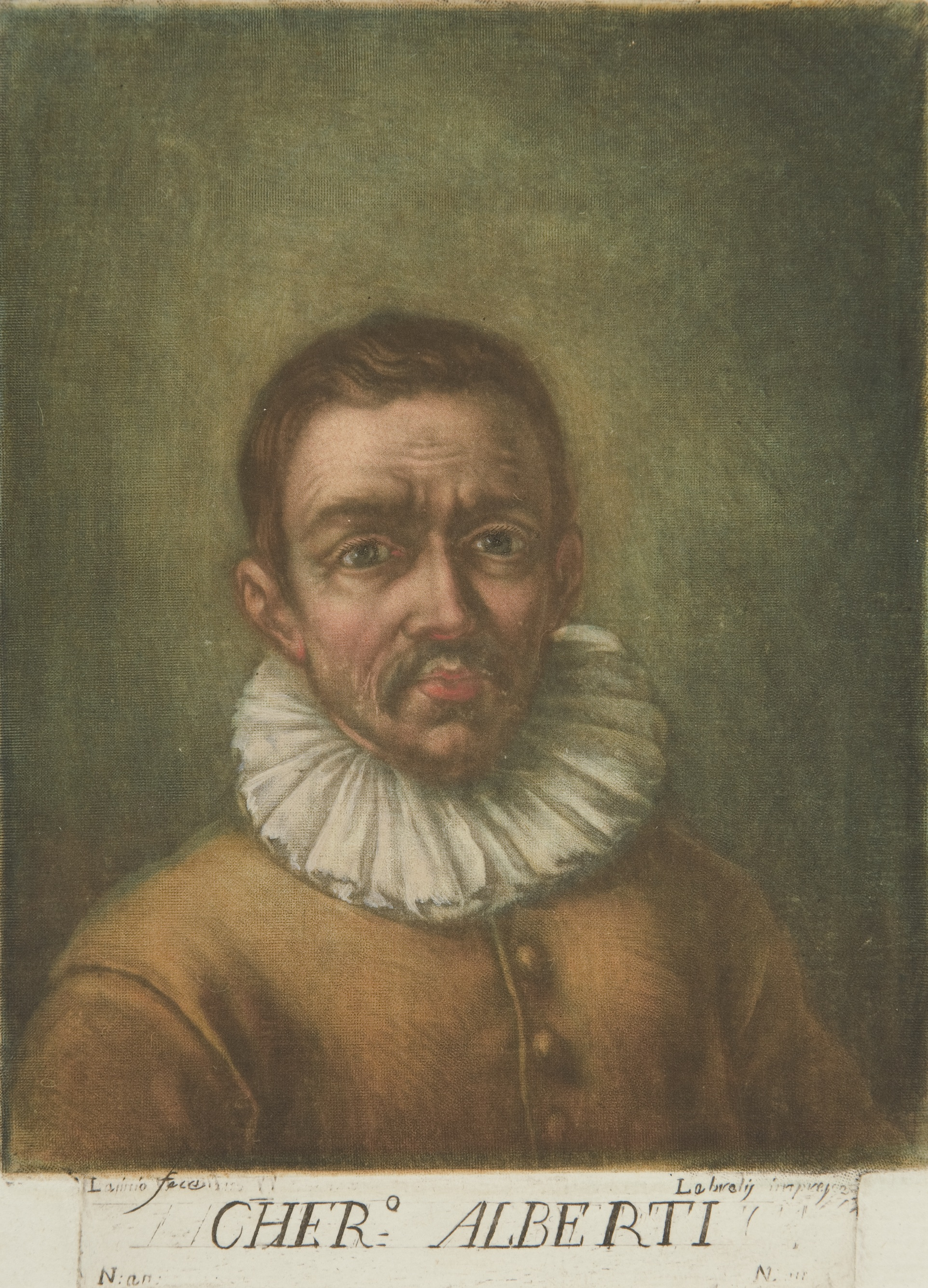
- Portrait of Cherubini Alberti by Carlo Lasinio (1759–1838)
- Born: 24 February 1553; Sansepolcro
- Died: 18 October 1615 (aged 62); Rome
- Style: Mannerist
- Patrons: Clement VIII

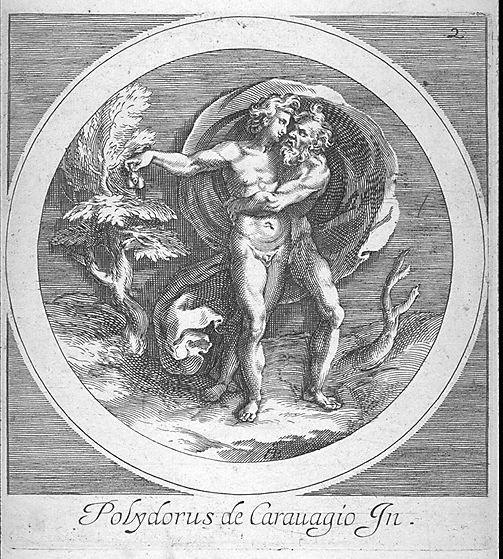
Giove bacia Ganimede by Cherubino Alberti, after a work by Polidoro da Caravaggio.

Cherubino Alberti (1553–1615), also called Borghegiano, was an Italian engraver and painter. He is most often remembered for the Roman frescoes completed with his brother Giovanni Alberti during the papacy of Clement VIII. He was most prolific as an engraver of copper plates.

== Biography ==
Alberti was born in 1553 in Borgo San Sepolcro, Tuscany (from which he took his nickname of Borgheggiano), into family of artists. He was the second son of Alberto Alberti, a carver and sculptor, and his brothers Alessandro Alberti and Giovanni Alberti were artists as well.

Alberti studied in Rome under Cornelius Cort and worked as an engraver, modeling his works after the inventions of other artists. His early influences included Raphael and contemporary Mannerist art. Between 1571 and 1575 he made engravings after works of Federico and Taddeo Zuccari. Over the next ten years his engravings included works after Raphael, Michelangelo, Polidoro da Caravaggio, Andrea del Sarto, Rosso Fiorentino, Marco Pino, Pellegrino Tibaldi, and Cristofano Gherardi. He also produced works based on ancient statues.

Later in life Alberti decorated palaces and churches with paintings in fresco. His most famous work was the fresco decoration of Sala Clementina in the Vatican, which he completed with his brother Giovanni. He painted for the church of Santa Maria in Via Lata. He may have been first a pupil of Cornelis Cort, and afterwards by studying the works of Agostino Carracci and Francesco Villamena.

At his death in Rome Alberti was Director of the Academy of Saint Luke, an association of artists.

== Works ==
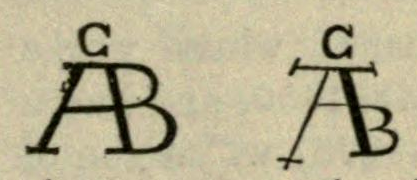
Two marks used by Cherubino Alberti

Over 180 engravings are attributed to Alberti, including:

- Portrait of Pope Gregory XIII. .
- St. Susannah resting against a pedestal, with a sword
- St. Jerome, meditating on the Crucifix
- The Crucifixion (1575), after Michelangelo
- St. Andrew bearing his Cross (1580)
- Two other figures, from the Last Judgment (1591)
- Charon, with two other figures (1575)
- Prometheus devoured by the Vulture (1580)
- Pietà, after the sculpture by Michelangelo
- Three—The Creation; Adam and Eve driven out of Paradise, from Polidoro da Caravaggio.
- The Death of the Children of Niobe, in five sheets
- Rape of the Sabines, after another frieze from Polidoro da Caravaggio
- The Triumph of Camillus; in the style of the antique.
- Pluto holding a torch. Fortune standing on a shell.
- The Presentation at the Temple; The Resurrection, and The Holy Family (1582) after Raphael.
- Jupiter and Ganymede (1580), after Raphael
- The Graces and Venus leaving Juno and Ceres, after a frieze by Raphael
- The Adoration of the Magi (1574), The Transfiguration, Christ praying on the Mount (1574) and Stoning of Stephen; after Il Rosso.
- A piece of architecture; after the same, in two prints. Raphael. 1582. Rome, 1575.
- The Baptism of our Saviour, by St. John (1574) and The Miracle of St. Philip Benizzo after Andrea del Sarto.
- Tobias and the Angel (1575), after Pellegrino Tibaldi
- Christ praying in the Garden, after Perino del Vaga.
- The Adoration of the Shepherds (1575), The Holy Family, The Scourging of Christ, Conversion of St. Paul, and Assumption of the Virgin, after Taddeo Zuccari.
- Assumption and The Coronation of the Virgin (1572), after Federico Zuccari.

== See also ==
- Orazio di Santis

== Bibliography ==
- Bryan, Michael (1886). Robert Edmund Graves (ed.). Dictionary of Painters and Engravers, Biographical and Critical. Vol. I A-K. London: George Bell and Sons. p. 13.
- James, Ralph N. (1896). Painters and their Works: A Dictionary of Great Artists who are Not Now Alive. London: L. Upcott Gill.
- Ottley, William Young (1831). Notices of Engravers and their Works. London: Longman, Rees, Orme, Brown & Green.
- Manescalchi, Roberto (2007). Cherubino Alberti la luce incisa. Firenze: Grafica European Center of Fine Arts. ISBN 978-88-95450-24-7.
