= Artists in biographies by Giovanni Baglione =

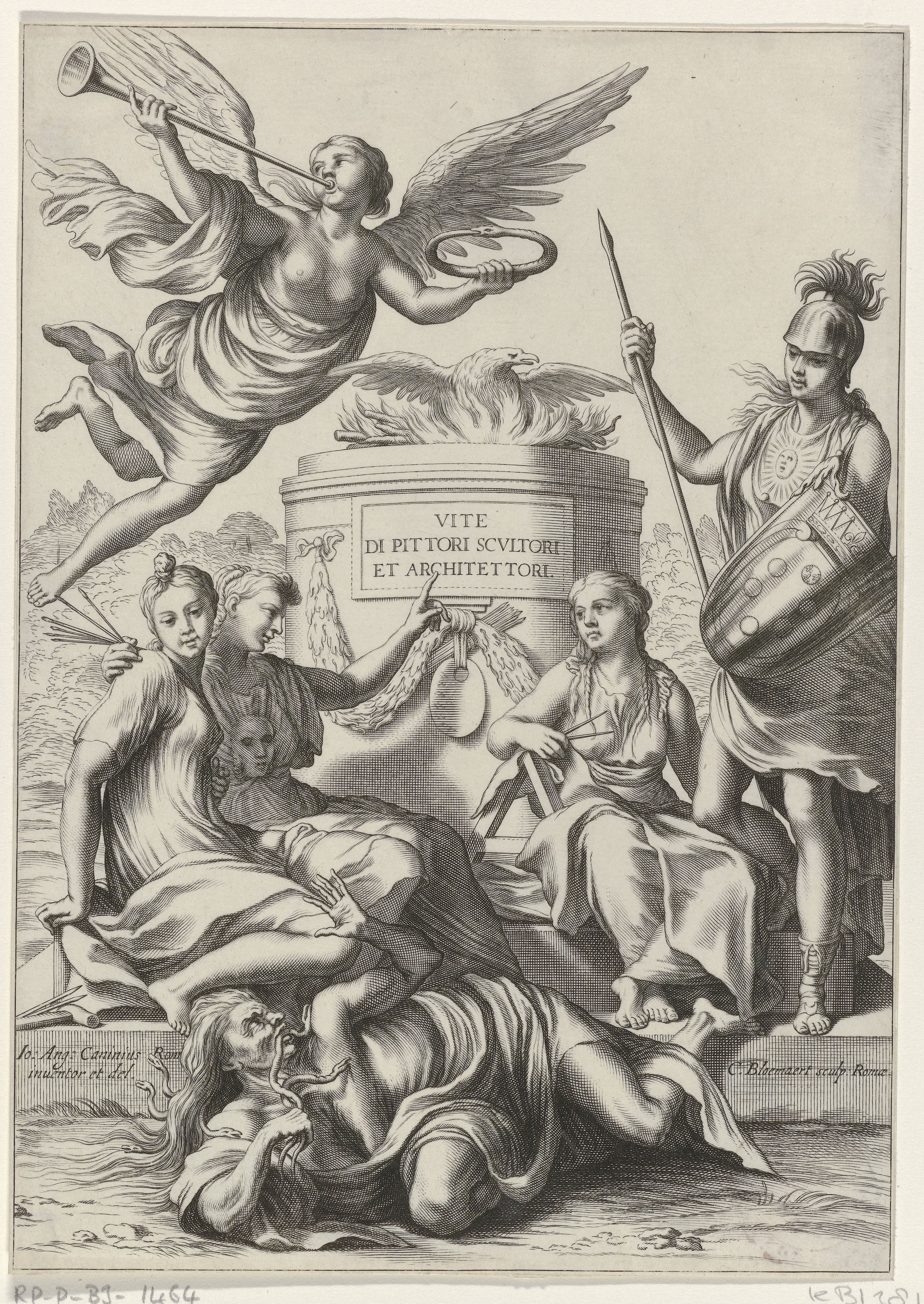
Title page of Giovanni Baglione's Le Vite de’ Pittori, Scultori et Architetti, Rome, 1642

Le Vite de’ Pittori, Scultori et Architetti. Dal Pontificato di Gregorio XII del 1572 in fino a’ tempi di Papa Urbano VIII nel 1642 ("Lives of the painters, sculptors, architects, from the papacies of Gregory XII in 1572 to Urban VIII in 1642") is an art history book by Giovanni Baglione, first published in 1642. It represents an encyclopedic compendium of biographies of the artists active in Rome during late Mannerism and early Baroque. Baglione (1566 – 1643) was a Late Mannerist and Early Baroque painter and art historian, best remembered for his writings and his acrimonious involvement with the artist Caravaggio, by whom he was nonetheless greatly influenced.

The book was first published in 1642, with a final version published in Naples in 1733, long after Baglione's death, with a biography of Salvator Rosa by Giovanni Battista Passeri as an appendix. The poet Ottavio Tronsarelli may have contributed a good deal of the text. The biographies are structured as a series of days (giornate) for each papacy, recalling the artists active in Rome during that time. Numerous errors are present, and Baglione's prejudices are often clear; however the book is regarded as a very valuable source from a well-placed observer of the Roman art world, who knew most of his subjects personally.

Baglione's young friend Giovanni Pietro Bellori contributed a long appreciative prefatory poem to Baglione's Vite. Over half a century separated the ages of the two historiographers of the Baroque, and a thirty year-old Bellori must have been very pleased to collaborate in 1642 with his senior, the more eminent Baglione. Years later, Bellori – older, altered, and now famous in his own right – not only repudiated this piece of juvenilia with its misguided embrace of naturalism in art but he also dismissed Baglione's Vite as worthless and poorly written. It is very likely that Bellori began to design his project of the Lives in those years as a reaction to the Lives of Baglione.

== First day: Works of Gregory XIII ==
- Jacopo Barozzi da Vignola;
- Pirro Ligorio;
- Giorgio Vasari; p. 10
- Giulio Clovio; p. 14
- Donato da Formello (Bracciano); p. 15
- Jacobo Sementa; p. 16
- Lorenzino da Bologna p. 17
- Livio Agresti; p. 18
- Marcello Venusti; p. 19
- Marco da Faenza; p. 21
- Girolamo da Sermoneta; p. 22
- Raffaellino da Reggio; p. 23
- Bartolommeo Ammanato; p. 26
- Battista Naldini p. 27
- Paolo Cespade p. 28
- Marco da Siena p. 29
- Matteo da Leccio; p. 30
- Francesco Trabaldese; p. 31

== Second day (Sixtus V) ==
- Lattanzio Bolognese; p. 36
- Giovanni Batista Pozzo (Giovanni Battista Pozzi); p. 37
- Niccolò Circignani; p. 38
- Prospero Bresciano (Prospero Scavezzi); p. 40
- Matteo da Siena p. 41
- Jacopo Zucchi p. 42
- Giovanni Batista Montano dalla Marca p. 44
- Francesco Salviati (il Volterra)
- Girolamo Muziano; p. 46
- Scipione Gaetano; p. 50
- Giacomo del Duca; p. 51
- Antonio de' Monti; p. 53
- Egnazio Danti (Ignazio Danti)

== Third day (Clement VIII) ==
- Pellegrino Pellegrini; p. 58
- Taddeo Landini; p. 60
- Santi Titi (Borgo San Sepolcro) (Santi di Tito); p. 61
- Giacomo Rocca; p. 62
- Niccolo d’ Aras (Nicolò Pippi D'Arras); p. 63
- Martino Longhi (the Elder); p. 64
- Egidio dell Riviera Fiammingo; p. 65
- Giovanni Alberti del Borgo San Sepolcro; p. 66
- Flamminio Vacca; p. 67
- Tommaso Laureti; p. 68
- Giovanni Battista della Porta; p. 70
- Jacopino del Conte; p. 71
- Pietro Paolo Olivieri; p. 72
- Arrigo Fiammingo; p. 73
- Giovanni Cosci Fiorentino; p. 74
- Giovanni Antonio da Valsoldo; p. 74
- Giacomo della Porta; p. 76
- Padre Giuseppe Valeriano; p. 78
- Cavalier Domenico Fontana; p. 79
- Francesco da Castello; p. 82
- Paris Nogari; p. 83
- Stefano Pieri; p. 85
- Lionardo da Serzana (Leonardo Sarzana); p. 85
- Fabrizio Parmigiano; p. 86
- Marco Tullio; p. 88

== Fourth day Paul V ==
- Giovanni Batista Fiammeri; p. 92
- Ottaviano Mascherino; p. 93
- Cope Fiammingo p. 94
- Adamo Tedesco (Adam Elsheimer); p. 95
- Francesco Zucchi; p. 96
- Antonio da Urbino (Antonio Viviani); p. 97
- Girolamo Maffei; p. 98
- Agostino Carracci; p. 99
- Annibale Carracci; p. 100
- Antonio da Faenza; p. 103
- Francesco Vanni; p. 104
- Giovanni Batista Milanese p. 105
- Pasquale Cati da Jesi; p. 106
- Cammillo Mariani p. 107
- Niccolo Cordieri p. 108
- Cesare Nebbia; p. 110
- Durante Alberti; p. 111
- Ventura Salimbene; p. 112
- Silla da Viggiù; (Silla Giacomo Longhi); p. 114
- Federico Zuccari; p. 115
- Niccolo da Pesaro; p. 119
- Pietro Fachetti; p. 120
- Giovanni de’ Vecchi del Borgo San Sepolcro; p. 121
- Cesare Torelli; p. 122
- Giovanni Fontana; p. 123
- Cherubino Alberti; p. 125
- Federigo Barocci; p. 126
- Flamminio Ponzio; p. 128
- Michelangelo da Caravaggio; p. 129
- Andrea d’Ancona; p. 132
- Orazio Borgianni; p. 133
- Lavinia Fontana; p. 136
- Lodovico Lione Padovano; p. 137
- Carlo Veneziano; p. 138
- Bernardino Cesari; p. 139
- Giovanni Batista da Novara; p. 140
- Antonio Carracci; p. 142
- Tommaso della Porta; p. 143
- Ludovico Civoli; p. 145
- Onorio Lunghi; p. 147
- Terenzio da Urbino; p. 149
- Bartolomeo Manfredi; p. 150
- Giovanni Guerra e fratelli; p. 151
- Padre Cosimo Cappucino; p. 152
- Cristofano e Francesco Stati da Bracciano; p. 153
- Anastasio Fontebuoni Fiorentino
- Vespasiano Strada Romano; p. 155
- Marzio di Cola Antonio Romano
- Carlo Lambardo Aretino; p. 157
- Cesare and Vincenzo Conti Fratelli; p. 158
- Tarquinio da Viterbo (Tarquinio Ligustri) and Giovanni Zanna Romano; p. 159
- Paolo Rossetti da Cento; p. 160
- Ambrogio Buonvicino Milanese; p. 161
- Antonio Scalvati; p. 162
- Giovanni Batista Viola; p. 163
- Rosato Rosati; p. 164
- Giovanni Fiammingo; p. 165

== Fifth Day Urban VIII ==
- Giacomo Palma (Jacopo Palma il Giovane); p. 172
- Bernardo Castelli; p. 173
- Cavaliere Pier Francesco Moranzone; p. 174
- Bartolommeo del Criscenzi; p. 176
- Tommaso Salini; p. 176
- Cristofano Roncalli; p. 178
- Antiveduto Grammatica; p. 180
- Cesare Rossetti; p. 183
- Paola Brillo; p. 184
- Baldassare Croce; p. 186
- Prospero Orsi; p. 188
- Avanzino da Citta’ di Castello; p. 188
- Antonio Pomarancio (Antonio Circignani); p. 189
- Paolo Guidotti; p. 191
- Pietro Bernini; p. 193
- Cristofano Casolano; p. 194
- Carlo Maderno; p. 195
- Francesco Nappi; p. 198
- Giovanni Serodine; p. 199
- Innocenzino Taccone; p. 200
- Giovanni da San Giovanni; p. 201
- Antonio Tempesta; p. 202
- Matteo Zaccolino; p. 204
- Biagio Betti; p. 205
- Agostino Ciampelli; p. 206
- Ottavio Padovano; p. 208
- Paolo San Quirico; p. 210
- Bastiano Torrisani; p. 211
- Pompeo Targone; p. 216
- Domenico Passignano; p. 218
- Andrea Comodo p. 220
- Filippo Napolitano; p. 221
- Giacomo Stella; p. 222
- Giovanni Giacomo Semenza; p. 230
- Bartolommeo Breccioli; p. 231
- Filippo Breccioli; p. 232
- Baldassare Galanino; p. 234
- Marcello Provenzale; p. 235
- Giuseppe del Bastaro; p. 236
- Stefano Speranza; p. 237
- Sigismondo Laire; p. 238
- Giovanni Valesio; p. 239
- Giuseppe Franco; p. 240
- Giovanni Batista Speranza; p. 242
- Orazio Gentileschi; p. 244
- Pietro Paolo Rubens; p. 246
- Giovanni Battista Crescenzi; p. 249
- Giuseppe Cesari; p. 252
- Giovanni Antonio Lelli; p. 260
- Gasparo Celio; p. 261
- Domenico Zampieri; p. 265
- Girolamo Nanni; p. 270
- Valentino Francese (Valentin de Boulogne); p. 223
- Guglielmo Bertolot; p. 224
- Antonio Casone; p. 225
- Ippolito Buzio; p. 227
- Francesco Parone; p. 228
- Pietro Paolo Gobbo; p. 229

=== Engravers ===
- Cornelio Cort Fiammingo; p. 271
- Sadeler family: Giusto/Justus, Giovanni/Jan, Egidio/Aegidius, and Raffaello/Rafael; p. 272
- Agostino and Annibale Carracci; p. 274
- Francesco Villamena d’Assisi; p. 276
- Lionardo, Isabella, and Bernardino Parasole; p. 278
- Giovanni Giorgio Nuovolstella; p. 279
- Filippo Tommasini Francese; p. 280
- Antonio Tempesta; p. 281
- Matteo Greuter p. 82
- Cavalier Giovanni Baglione; p. 284
- Salvator Rosa; p. 289

== Sources ==
- Baglione, Giovanni (1733). Giovanni Battista Passeri (ed.). Le Vite de' Pittori, Scultori, Architetti, ed Intagliatori dal Pontificato di Gregorio XII del 1572. fino a' tempi de Papa Urbano VIII. nel 1642. Naples.
- Ostrow, Steven F., review of Giovanni Baglione: Artistic Reputation in Baroque Rome by Maryvelma Smith O'Neil, The Art Bulletin, Vol. 85, No. 3 (Sep., 2003), pp. 608–611
