= Giovanni Serodine =

Italian painter

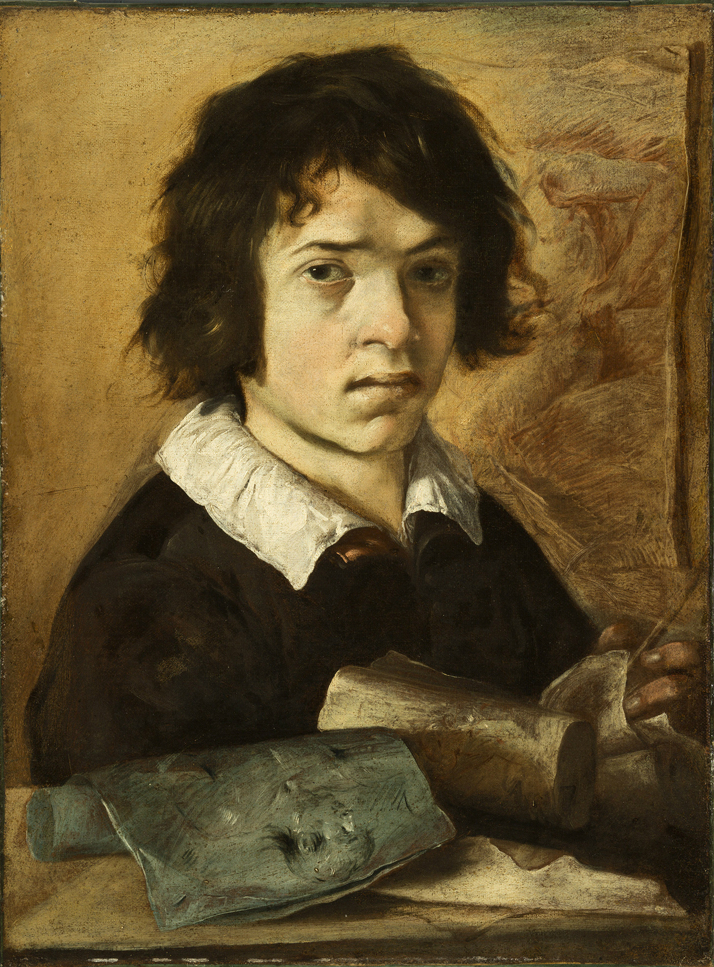
- Self-portrait, New York, priv. col.
- Born: 1600; Ascona, Ticino
- Died: 21 December 1630 (aged 29–30); Rome, Papal States
- Known for: Painting
- Movement: Baroque; Caravaggisti

Giovanni Serodine (1600 – 21 December 1630) was a Swiss-Italian painter of the early Baroque period. Born in Ticino, he lived for most of his life in Rome, where he developed an idiosyncratic expression of Carravaggist style. His style has the loose brushstroke and luminosity of some of the Northern and Venetian Caravaggisti, such as Johann Liss, Bernardo Strozzi and Domenico Fetti. However, some of Serodine's canvases show a provincial eccentricity, for example the Coronation of the Virgin in Ascona.

== Biography ==
Born to a family of stuccoists in Ascona in Ticino (in present-day Switzerland), he moved to Rome with his father around 1615. His first work was probably done in association with his brother Giovanni Battista Serodine (1589/90–1630), a stuccoist active in Rome, where he carved a Virgin and Child (1614) for the façade of Santa Francesca Romana, and in Ascona, where he restored the family home and decorated it with stucco (1620). The design and stucco decoration of the church of the Madonna della Fortuna on Monte Verità (Ascona) are attributed to him, though it is probable that Giovanni (who is recorded in Ascona in 1620) collaborated in the work.

The first of Giovanni’s documented official commissions, however, was for the stucco decoration and apsidal paintings in the chuch of Santa Maria della Concezione in Spoleto, where he worked with Sante Ghezzi. These murals, painted in tempera and completed in July 1624, are sketchy and clumsily executed, quite distinct in their inferior quality and naive piety from the rest of Serodine’s work. They are probably his first attempts at painting, made without the benefit of any training in draughtsmanship. A greater mastery and freedom of style are evident in the church’s stucco decoration, which is the only authenticated example of Serodine’s work as a modeller.

The first known example of Serodine’s easel paintings is the Calling of the Sons of Zebedee (1623–1624; Ascona, Santi Pietro e Paolo), which has often been considered (although the hypothesis cannot be confirmed) as a companion piece to the Christ at Emmaus in the same church. These paintings were probably executed in Rome and taken to Ascona after Serodine’s death by his father, who then gave them to the church in 1633. Both, especially the better-conserved Calling, clearly show the influence of Caravaggio. The figures, modelled on humble peasants, are overwhelmingly physical and recall Caravaggio’s Virgin of Loreto (Sant'Agostino, Rome). The close adherence to Caravaggio’s naturalism was not as widespread or as much appreciated a style as the ‘acceptable Caravaggism’ of Bartolomeo Manfredi and Antiveduto Grammatica. Serodine’s swift, broad brushstrokes with rough edges had their immediate precedent in the technique of Orazio Borgianni and Marco Antonio Bassetti of Verona.

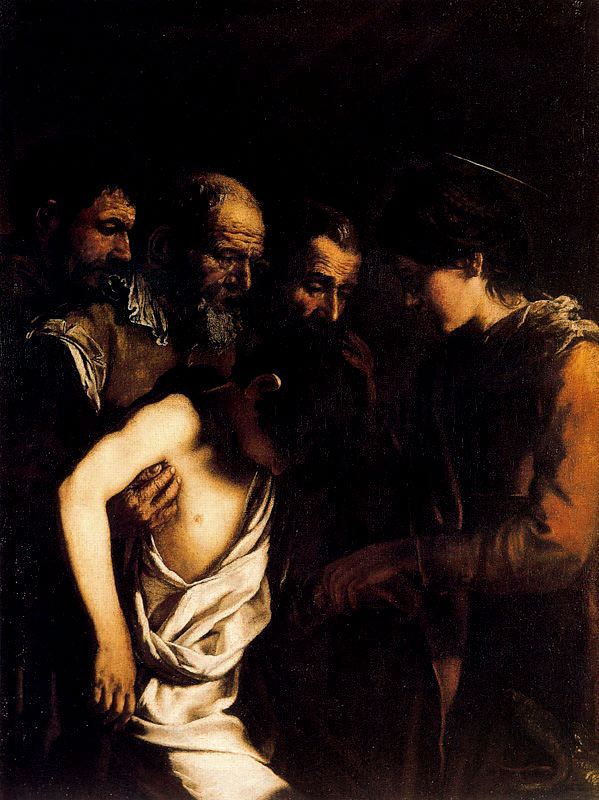
The Miracle of St. Margaret, Museo del Prado, Madrid

The Miracle of St. Margaret (Madrid, Museo del Prado), also close to Caravaggio in style, may date from around this time. Serodine’s growing reputation in Rome is confirmed by a commission for two canvases for San Lorenzo fuori le mura: the Alms of St. Lawrence (Casamari Abbey) and the Beheading of John the Baptist (in situ). The stronger characterization of the figures, especially of the three beggars in the Alms, and the more spacious and uncluttered compositions suggest that the works were executed after 1625 (i.e. after the suggested date for the two Ascona canvases), which would, moreover, fit in with the completion of the rebuilding of the church. In these two canvases Serodine interprets Caravaggio’s use of light in his Roman period in a more personal way, using it not so much to give plasticity to the figures as to dramatize the scene, with a strong contrast of light and shadow for a more diffused light that reveals every object in the domestic setting. The slightly elevated viewpoint contributes to an effect of extraordinary naturalness and immediacy. The artist’s father is also the model for St. Joseph in the Holy Family (Ascona, priv. col.), which was probably painted at around the same time. Similar stylistic characteristics are to be found in the large Madonna of the Mercedarians (1620–25; London, Matthiesen Gallery).

In his short mature career, Serodine produced a handful of intensely emotional tenebrist canvases such as a Christ among the Doctors (1626; Paris, Louvre), The Tribute Money (c. 1630; Edinburgh, Scottish National Gallery), the Decapitation of St. John the Baptist (San Lorenzo fuori le Mura), St. Michael (originally San Pietro in Montorio) and Transfiguration of Christ (whereabouts unknown), Portrait of the Painter's Father (1628; Lugano, Civic Museum) and Portrait of a Philosopher (Rancate). The artist’s last work is considered to be the great Coronation of the Virgin (1625–30; Ascona, Santi Pietro e Paolo), painted in Rome and taken to Ascona by his father in 1631, where Giovanni and Antonia Bettatino of Ascona presented it to the church. Below the clouds, which isolate the sacred event, the six saints in the foreground with their rustic features enlivened by the sunlight falling from the left are the highest achievement of Serodine’s art. The quality of the light and the texture of the painting show that Serodine had moved away from Caravaggio’s style while remaining faithful to the moral and human aspects of his art.

Although Baglione called him an industrious carver of marble and his family referred to him as ‘sculptor et architettus’ in the inscription they appended to his Calling of the Sons of Zebedee, no evidence of Serodine’s work in these areas has survived. Baglione, who dedicated to Serodine one of his Vite, found in his art a great vivacity, although he noted Serodine appears to have made few friends and patrons in Rome.

== Selected Works ==
St. Peter, Gemäldegalerie, Berlin

- The Calling of the Sons of Zebedee, 1623–24, Ascona, Santi Pietro e Paolo;
- Christ at Emmaus, 1623–1624, Ascona, Santi Pietro e Paolo;
- The Miracle of St. Margaret, c. 1625, Museo del Prado, Madrid;
- St. Jerome, 1620, priv. col.;
- Pala dei Mercedari, 1620–30, Pinacoteca Cantonale Giovanni Züst, Mendrisio;
- The Tribute Money, c. 1630, Edinburgh, Scottish National Gallery;
- The Coronation of the Virgin, 1625–30, Ascona, Santi Pietro e Paolo;
- The Mocking of Christ, c. 1625, priv. col.;
- St. Peter and St. Paul Led to Martyrdom, 1625–26, Galleria Nazionale d'Arte Antica, Rome;
- The Holy Family, 1625–26, Casa Patriziale, Ascona;
- The Alms of St. Lawrence, 1625–1626, Casamari Abbey;
- St. Peter, 1625–1630, Gemäldegalerie, Berlin;
- Christ among the Doctors, 1626, Louvre, Paris;
- Portrait of the Painter's Father, 1628, Lugano, Civic Museum;
- St. Peter in Prison, 1628, Pinacoteca Cantonale Giovanni Züst, Mendrisio;
- The Incredulity of St. Thomas, 1620s, National Museum in Warsaw.
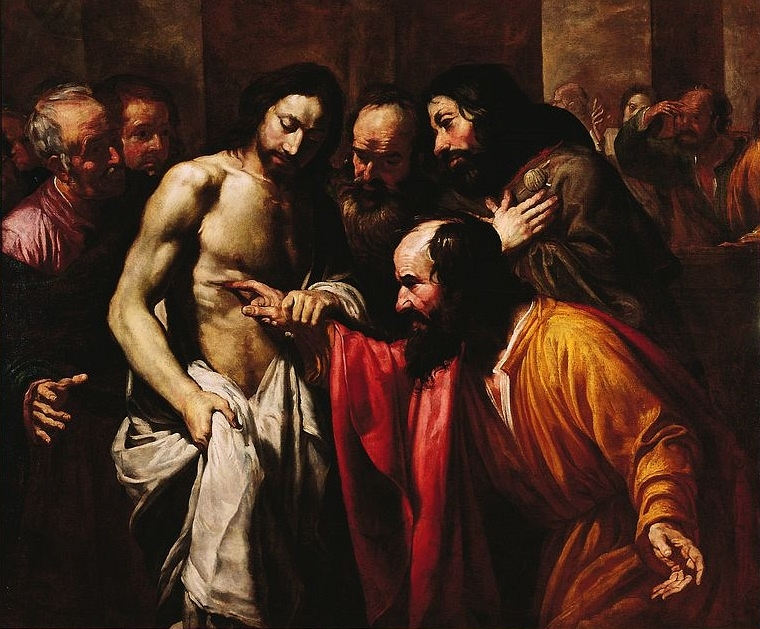
The Incredulity of St. Thomas, 1620s, National Museum in Warsaw

The Mocking of Christ, c. 1625, priv. col.

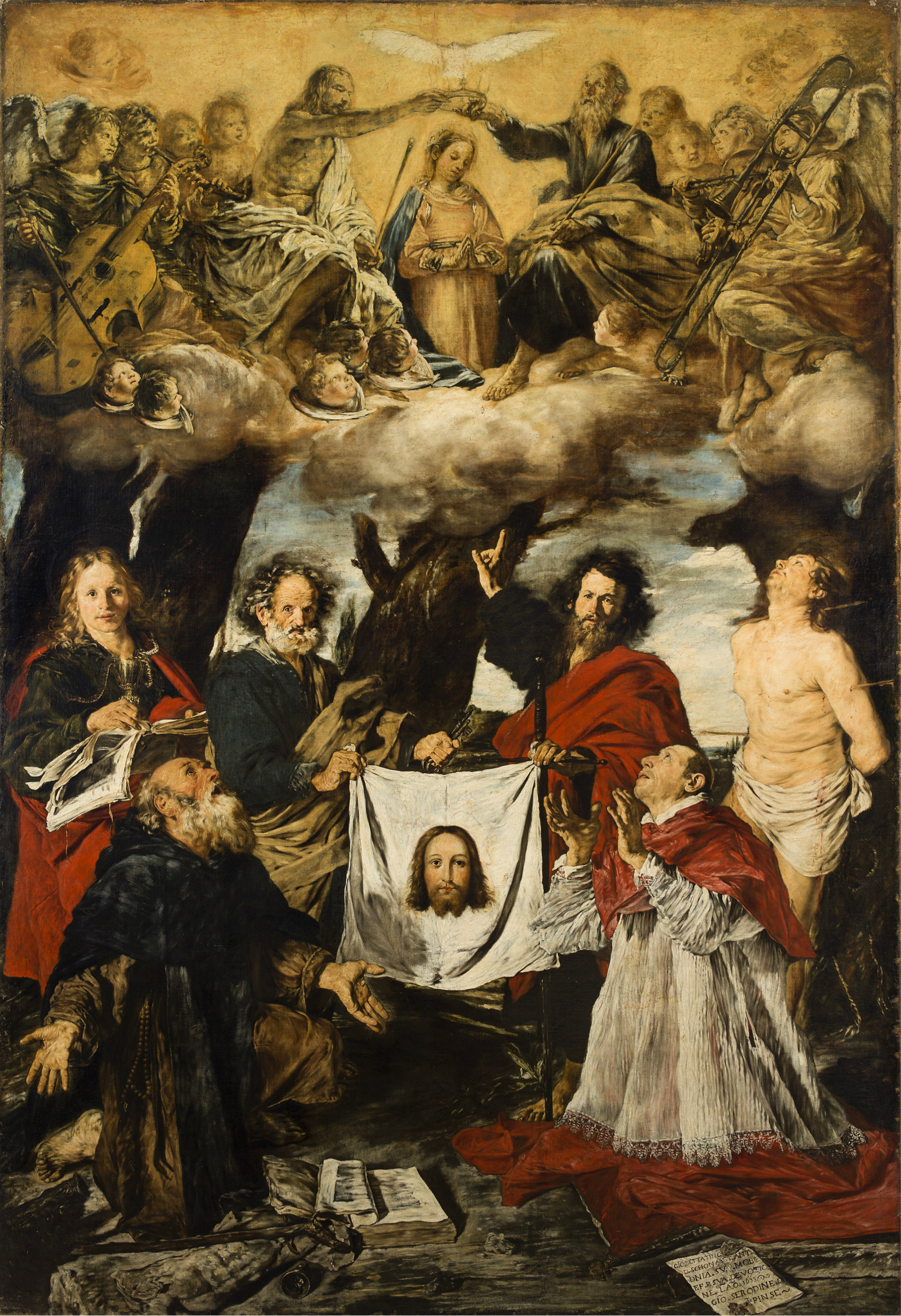
The Coronation of the Virgin, 1625–30, Ascona, parish church

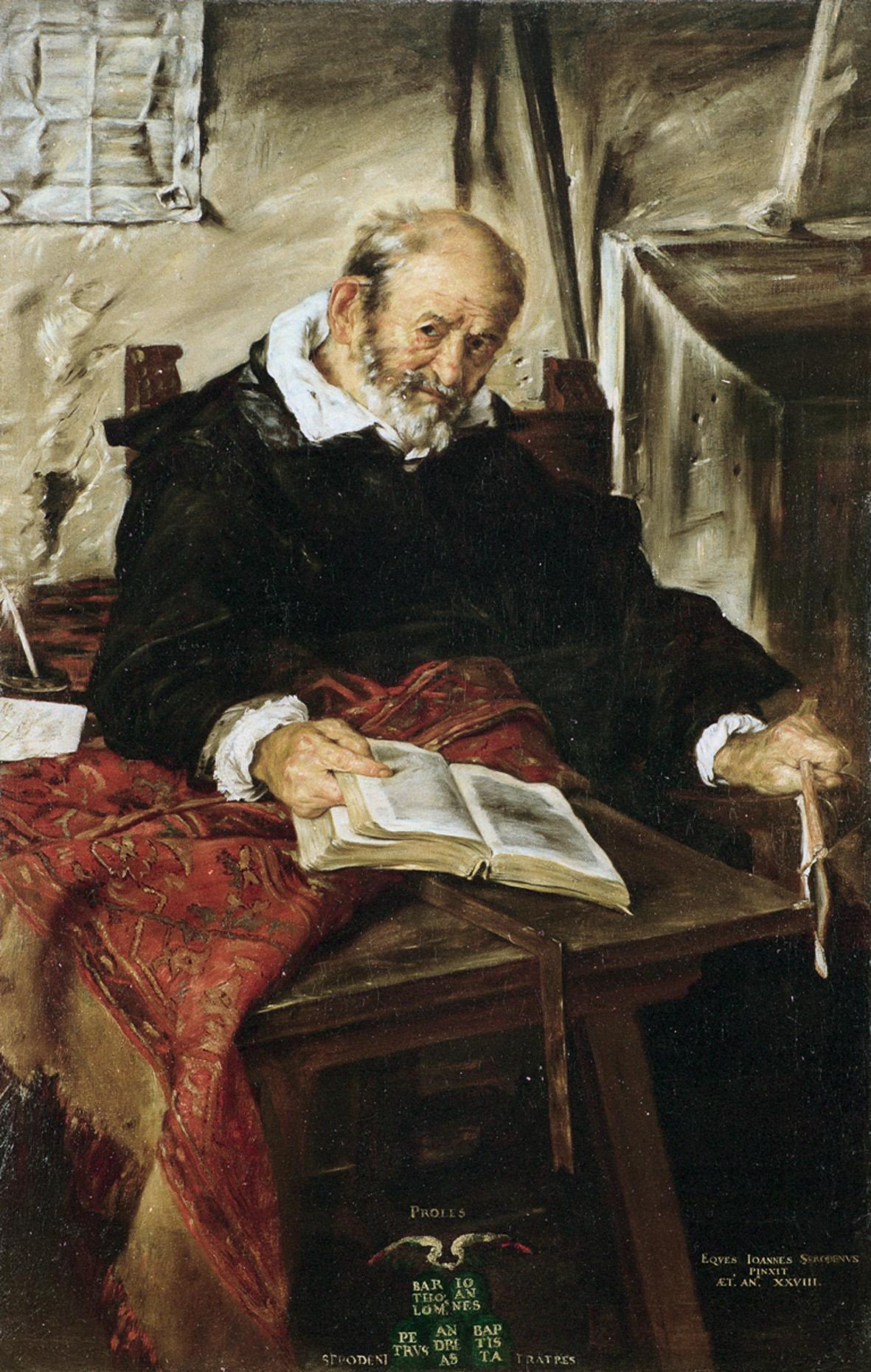
Portrait of the Painter's Father, 1628, Lugano, Civic Museum

The Tribute Money, c. 1630, Edinburgh, Scottish National Gallery

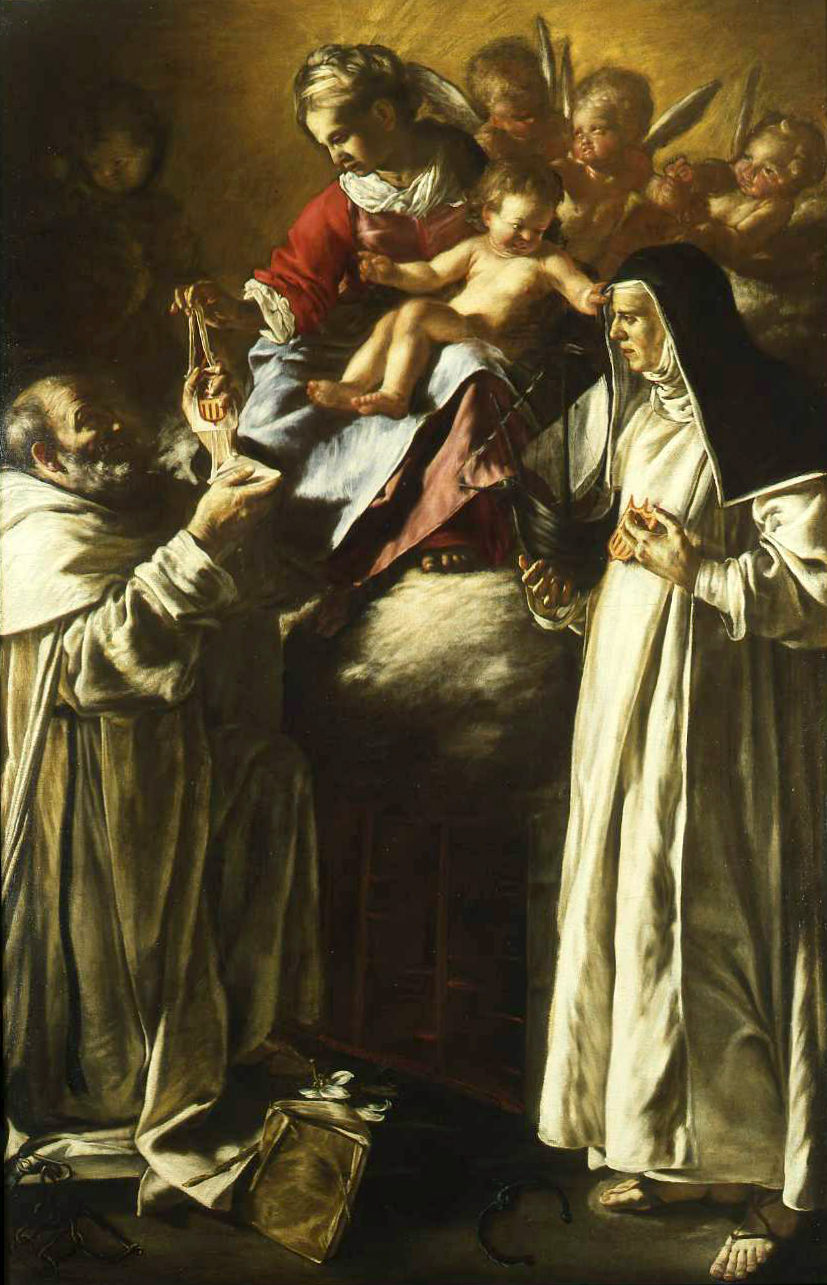
Pala dei Mercedari, 1620–30, Pinacoteca Cantonale Giovanni Züst, Mendrisio

The Holy Family, 1625–26, Casa Patriziale, Ascona

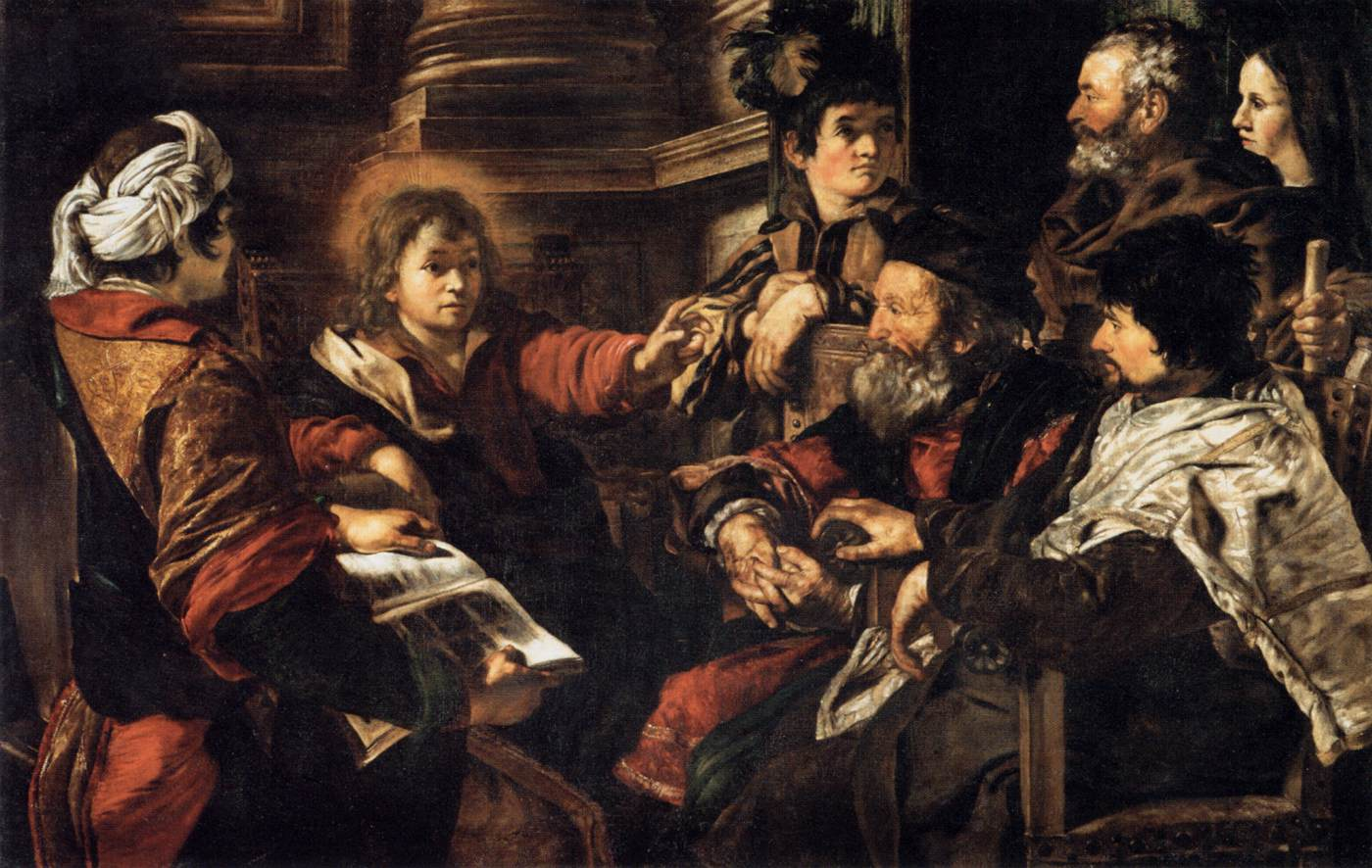
Christ among the Doctors, 1626, Louvre, Paris

== Bibliography ==
- Baglione, Giovanni (1995). Jacob Hess; Herwarth Röttgen (eds.). Le vite de’ pittori, scultori et architetti. Dal pontificato di Gregorio XIII del 1572 in fino a’ tempi di papa Urbano VIII nel 1642. Vol. I. Città del Vaticano. pp. 311–12.
- Fiocco, Giuseppe (October 1929). "A Masterpiece by Giovanni Serodine". The Burlington Magazine. 55 (319): 190–191, 195.
- Scharf, A. (December 1950). "A Giovanni Serodine Exhibition". The Burlington Magazine. 92 (573): 352, 354–355. JSTOR 870654.
- Coelho, Victor (1992). "Musical Myth and Galilean Science in Giovanni Serodine's Allegoria Della Scienza". In Victor Coelho (ed.). Music and Science in the Age of Galileo. Dordrecht: Springer. doi:10.1007/978-94-015-8004-5_6.
