= Santa Maria della Consolazione =

Church of Santa Maria della Consolazione
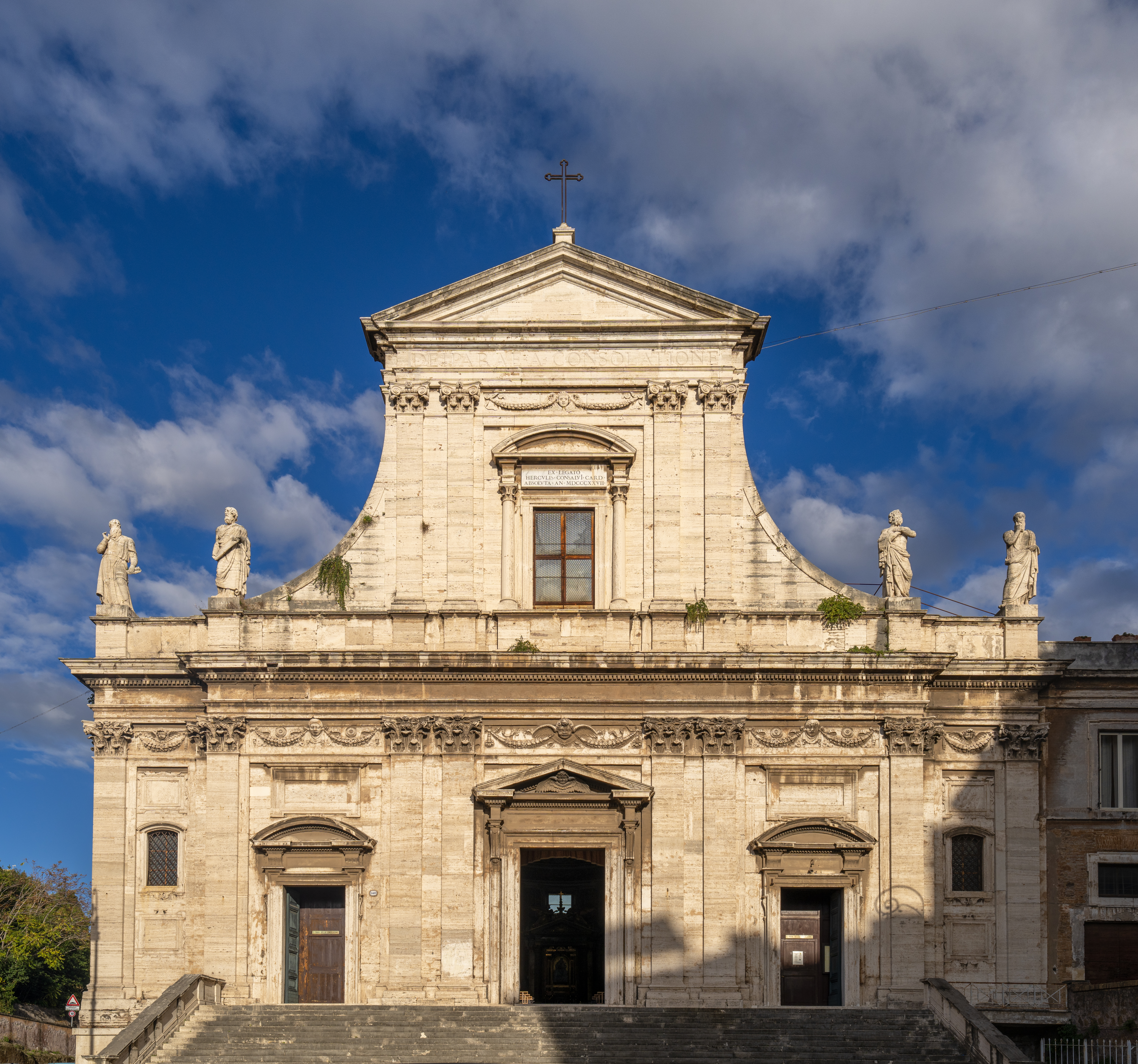
- Facade
- Click on the map for a fullscreen view
- 41°53′29″N 12°28′59″E
- Location: Rome
- Country: Italy
- Denomination: Catholic Church
- Religious order: Capuchin Franciscans

Architecture
- Architect: Martino Longhi the Elder
- Architectural type: Church
- Style: Renaissance
- Groundbreaking: 1470, 1583
- Completed: 1600

Administration
- Province: Rome

The Church of Santa Maria della Consolazione is a Roman Catholic baroque style church at the foot of the Palatine Hill in rione Campitelli, Rome, Italy.

The shrine is dedicated to the Blessed Virgin Mary under the title of Our Lady of Consolation and is administered by the Order of Friars Minor Capuchin.

== History ==
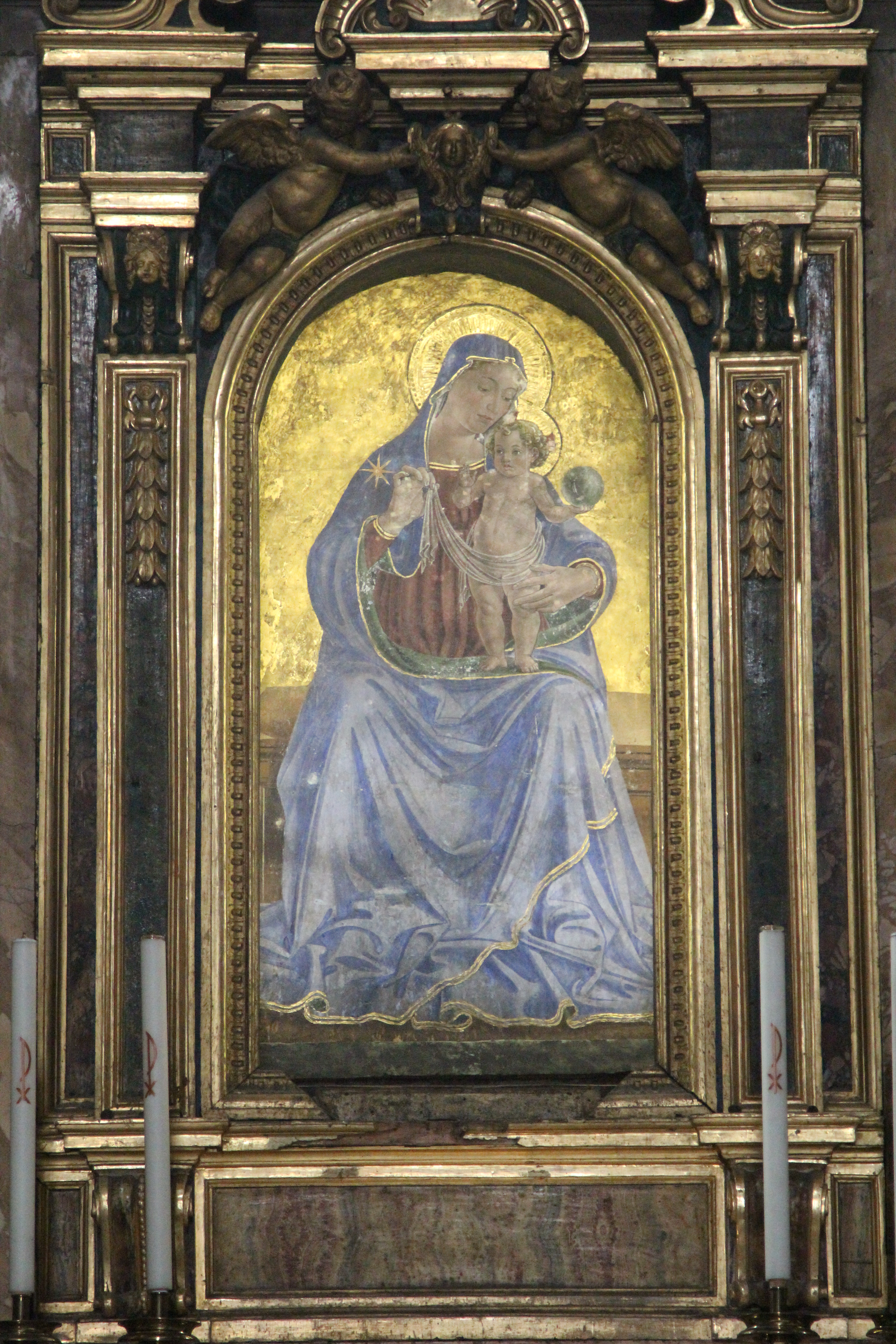
The famed Madonna and Child of Consolation (circa 1385) venerated within the shrine. Pope Urban VIII crowned this image on 7 December 1634.

The church is named after an icon of the Virgin Mary which was placed on this site to console criminals who were tossed down off the cliff above the church, thought to be the Tarpeian Rock from where condemned Ancient Roman criminals were tossed to their death in Ancient Roman times. In 23 June 1385, a condemned nobleman, Giordanello degli Alberini, paid 2 gold florins for the icon to provide consolation for criminals facing death.

Pope Sixtus V on the occasion of their 200th year anniversary recognized the pious association under this Marian title on 3 June 1585. He issued a Pontifical decree titled Licet ex Debito which elevated their status to an Archconfraternity.

Pope Urban VIII further approved the venerated image recognized by the Vatican Chapter, which was promoted by Count Alessandro Sforza and Pontifically crowned on 7 December 1634.

== Baroque architecture ==
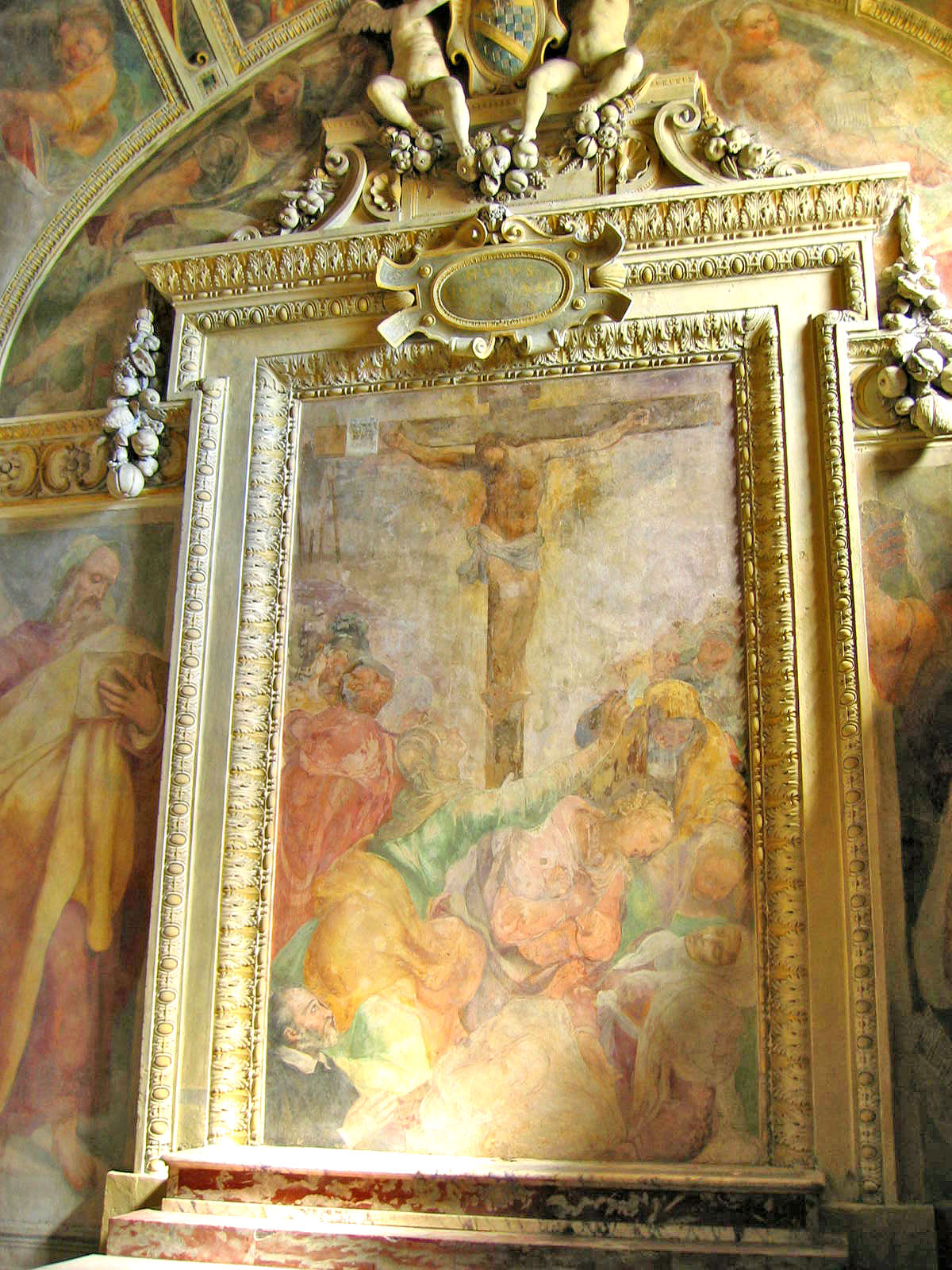
The Crucifixion (1556) by Taddeo Zuccari.

A church originally was built here in 1470, but rebuilt during 1583–1600 by Martino Longhi the Elder, during which time the Mannerist façade was installed. The tympanum was completed in 1827 by Pasquale Belli.

- The first chapel on the right has frescoes of Scenes of the Passion (1556) by Taddeo Zuccari.
- The second chapel on has a Madonna with Child and Saints (1575) by Livio Agresti.
- The third chapel on the right has a Story of Jesus and Virgin by Giovanni Baglione. The chapel to the right of the presbytery has an icon of the Virgin from the 13th century. The altar, designed by Martino Longhi, has a fresco copy of the 14th century Madonna della Consolazione, repainted by Antoniazzo Romano. The walls of the presbytery are frescoed with a Nativity and an Assumption by Niccolò Circignani (il Pomarancio), who also painted the Scenes of the Life of Mary and Jesus in the fifth chapel.
- The 4th chapel to the left has frescoes on the Life of Saint Andrew by Marzio Colantonio Ganassini. In the 3rd chapel on the left, are frescoes of scenes from the Life of the Virgin by Francesco Nappi; the 2nd chapel on the left has a Saint Francis receives the Stigmata of the 17th century; the 1st chapel has a Mystical Marriage of Saint Catherine (c. 1530), and a marble relief by Raffaello da Montelupo.
