= Tommaso Laureti =

Italian painter

Tommaso Laureti, often called Tommaso Laureti Siciliano (c. 1530 – 22 September 1602), was an Italian painter from Sicily who trained in the atelier of the aged Sebastiano del Piombo and worked in Bologna. From 1582, he worked for papal patrons in Rome in a Michelangelo-inspired style with special skill in illusionistic perspective, that in his Roman work avoided all but traces of Mannerism.

== Biography ==
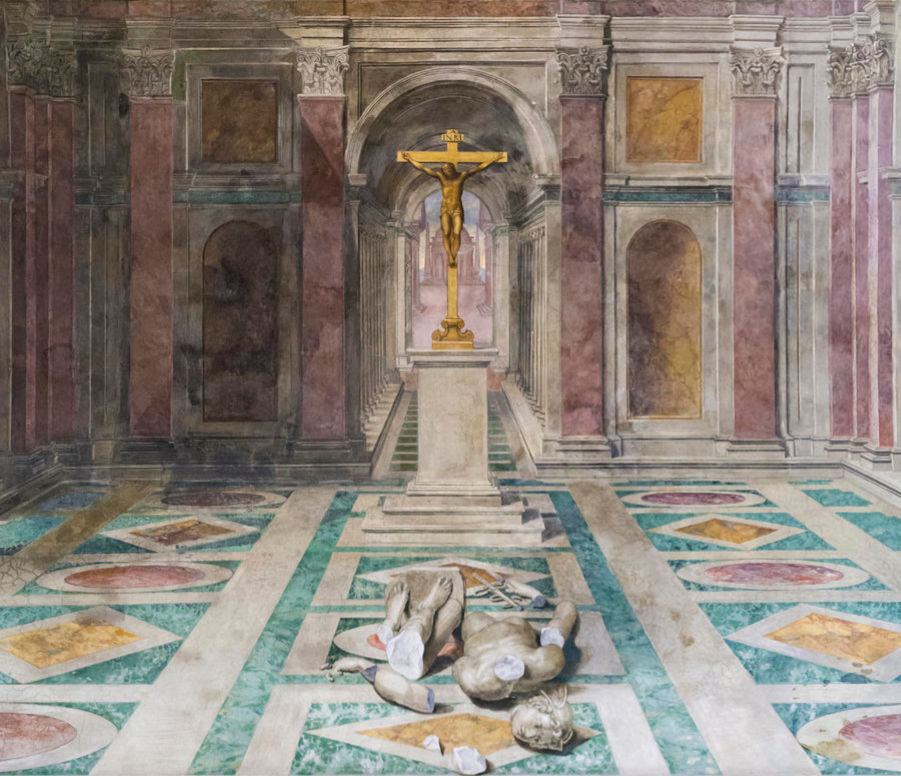
Triumph of The Cross fresco (detail), 1585, Sala di Costantino, Vatican Palace

Laureti was born in Palermo, Sicily. After his first master's death in 1547, he settled in Bologna, introducing illusionistic perspective paintings on ceilings to the city, notably an Alexander the Great ceiling with a painted architectural setting in Palazzo Vizzani. He painted a Transportation of the Body of Saint Augustine for the church of San Giacomo Maggiore in Bologna. The Mannerist structural elements of the marble and bronze Fountain of Neptune in Bologna, which is surmounted by Giambologna's Neptune, completed in 1566, were based on a 1563 drawing by Laureti. This commission from Pope Pius IV is undoubtedly Laureti's most familiar public work (illustration, left below).

In the church of Santa Susanna in Rome, Laureti's Death of Saint Susanna the main altarpiece in the church. His frescoes in the Sala dei Capitani in Michelangelo's Palazzo dei Conservatori on the Campidoglio, painted in 1587-94, depict episodes from Ancient Roman republic: The Justice of Brutus; Horatius Cocles defending the Pons Sublicius; Victory at Lake Regillus; and Mucius Scaevola before Lars Porsena.

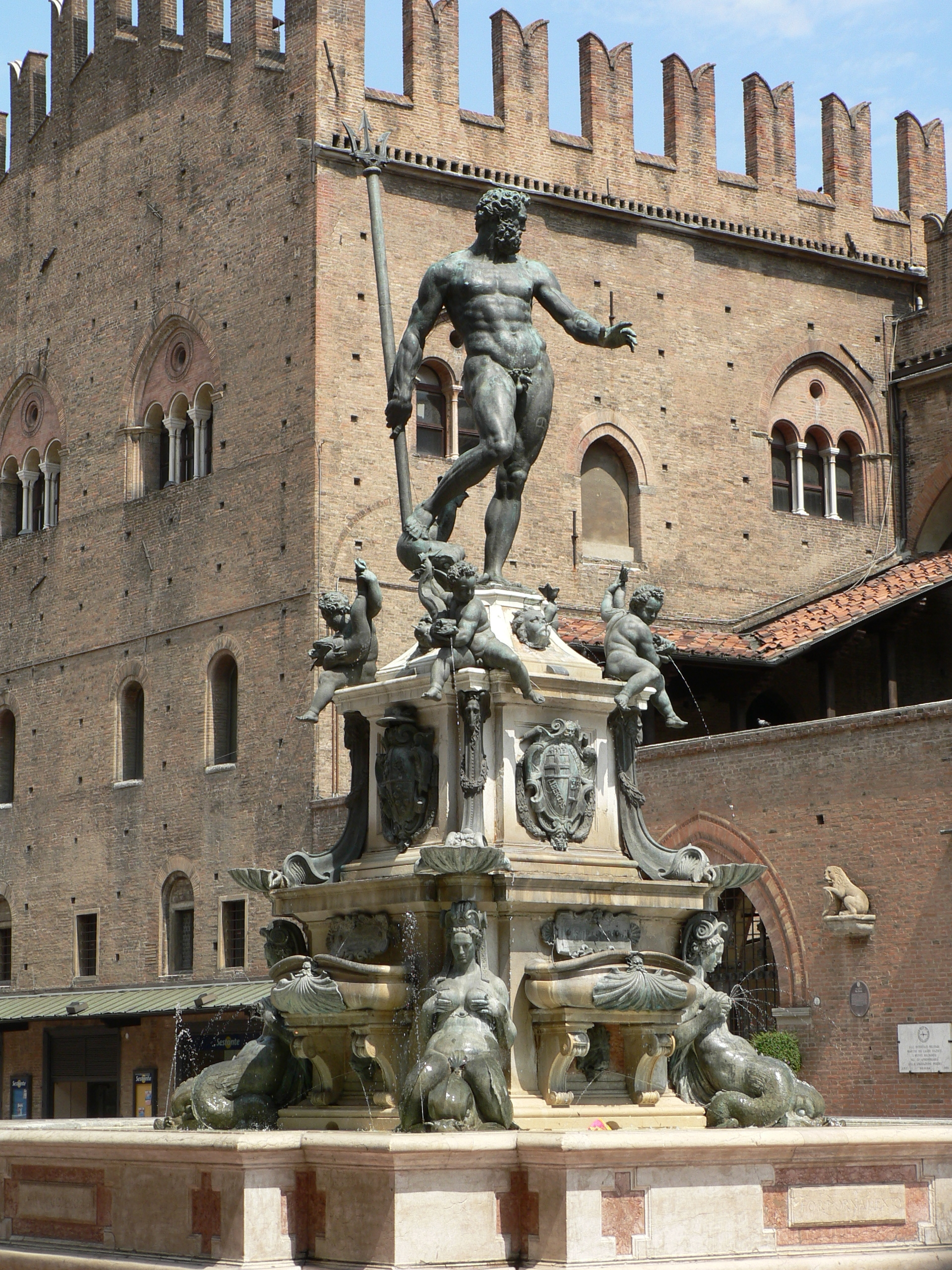
Laureti designed the base with its figures for Giambologna's Neptune Fountain, Bologna.

In 1582, the administration of Pope Gregory XIII commissioned Laureti to execute a series of frescoes on a post-Council of Trent triumphalist theme, The Triumph of the Christian religion on the newly vaulted ceiling of the Sala di Costantino or Hall of Constantine, where the walls had been frescoed by the school of Raphael earlier in the century. The central theme is surrounded by allegorical female figures representing the Italian provinces. The ceiling was completed under the pontificate of Sixtus V, who had grown discontent with the dilatory performance of Laureti. The rigorous illusionistic perspectives represent the painter's constant fascination with the art of perspective. Baglione in his biographies of artists states Laureti was assisted by the painter Antonio Scalvati.

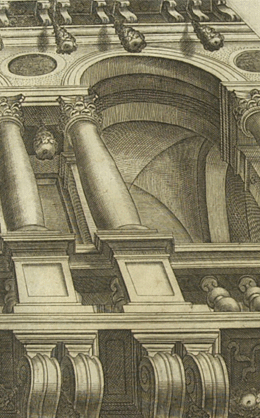
Laureti perspective engraved for Vignola's Due regole…, 1583

Laureti's perspective design for a portion of an illusionistic ceiling, seen as di sotto in su or 'from below to above', was engraved for Giacomo Barozzi da Vignola's, Le due regole della prospettiva pratica., 1583 (illustration, right).

For the Basilica of San Prospero in Reggio Emilia, he painted an altarpiece depicting the Assumption; this painting was completed by Ludovico Carracci in 1602.

Laureti was the second principe or director of the Accademia di San Luca or the artists' academy in Rome, succeeding Federico Zuccari in 1595. His commemorative portrait (dated 1603) by Orazio Borgianni is still on display in the Accademia di San Luca.

== Sources ==
- Filippo Titi, Descrizione delle Pitture, Sculture e Architetture esposte in Roma, 1763
- (Getty Museum) "the Geometry of Seeing" 2002
- Laueti and the Sala di Costantino
- Roberto Piperno, "Chiesa di Santa Susanna" G. Vasi's description, 1761.
- Freedberg, Sydney J. (1993). Pelican History of Art (ed.). Painting in Italy, 1500-1600. Penguin Books Ltd. pp. 654–55.
