= Pierre-François Hugues d'Hancarville =

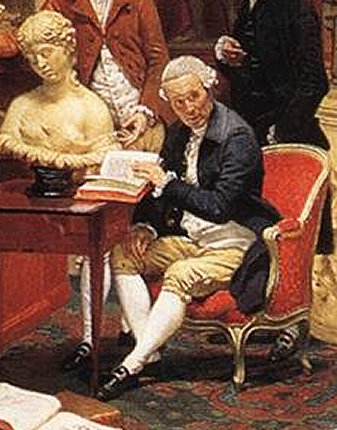
d'Hancarville by Zoffany, detail from "Charles Townley's Library" (circa 1782).

Pierre-François Hugues, Baron d'Hancarville (Nancy 1719 – Padua 1805) was an art historian and historian of ideas.

== Biography ==
Pierre Francois Hugues was born in 1719 at Nancy, France, the son of a bankrupt cloth-merchant. He himself later added the title of ‘baron d'Hancarville’ to his name.

An amateur art dealer, he introduced William Hamilton, British ambassador at Naples, to the Porcinari family, whose collection of antiquities Hamilton bought, and subsequently sold to the British Museum in London. With Hamilton Hugues compiled the Collection Of Etruscan, Greek And Roman Antiquities From The Cabinet Of The Honble. Wm. Hamilton ... = Antiquités Etrusques, Grecques Et Romains, Tirees Du Cabinet De M. Hamilton ... (4 volumes, Naples 1766-67 but possibly published 1767–76). The 'Antiquities' shown and discussed in these volumes are nearly all ancient Greek vases, collected from Herculaneum, Pompeii and other parts of south Italy and Greece. Hamilton and Hugues intended this collection of vases not only to provide models for contemporary designers but also, because of their great number, to serve as a help in tracing the historic development of the 'stiles of the different periods in the Art of the Ancients' (vol. 1, p. 168). As well as discussing the technique and aesthetic of ancient vase-painting Hugues also propounds some innovative ideas on the difference between art as symbol and art as representation - ideas which he would develop in his Recherches Sur L'Origine, L'Esprit Et Les Progres Des Arts De La Grece; Sur Leur Connections Avec Les Arts Et La Religion Des Plus Anciens Peuples Connus ... (3 vols., A Londres, 1785).

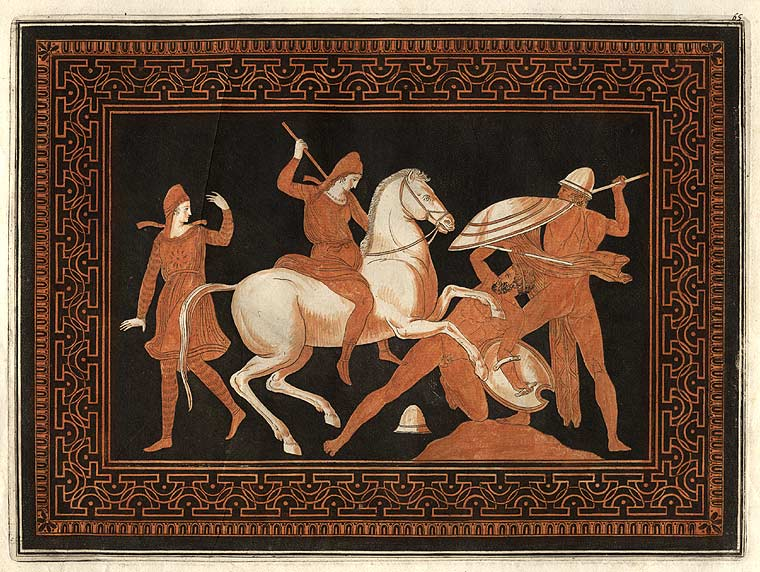
Engraving for d'Hancarville

In 1772 Hamilton's first collection of vases was bought by the British Museum. The four volumes of the Antiquites, printed by Francesco Morelli and copiously illustrated (and with many copies hand-painted), form one of the most beautiful books ever made. Their illustrations were directly copied by Josiah Wedgwood and other pottery manufacturers, and fostered the Neoclassical taste for outline drawing and engraving adopted by John Flaxman and others.

In 1769 Hancarville was forced to flee his creditors in Naples.

Hancarville also produced two pornographic volumes under fictitious imprints:

- Monumens de la vie privée des XII Césars d’apres une suite de pierres et médailles gravées sous leur règne. Capree, chez Sabellus, 1780
- Monumens du culte secret des dames romaines. Rome: De l'Imprimerie du Vatican, 1787

These were widely pirated, in variously incompetent editions, during his lifetime.

Hugues died at Padua in 1805.
