= Nanni =

Nanni is an Italian surname and a masculine Italian given name (as a shortened form of Giovanni). Notable people with the name include:

== Surname ==
- Federico Nanni (born 1981), Sammarinese footballer
- Girolamo Nanni, 17th-century Italian painter of the Baroque period
- Giulia Nanni (born 1997), Italian professional racing cyclist
- Mauricio Nanni (1979–2026), Uruguayan footballer
- Miguel Nanni (born 1977), Argentine politician
- Roberto Nanni (born 1981), Argentine footballer
- Saul Nanni (born 1999), Italian actor
- Tito Nanni (born 1959), American former professional baseball player

== Given name ==
- Nanni (born before 1750 BC), author of the first known complaint letter (Complaint tablet to Ea-nāṣir)
- Nanni Baldini (born 1975), Italian voice actor
- Nanni Balestrini (1935–2019), Italian experimental poet, author and visual artist
- Nanni di Banco (c. 1384–1421), Italian sculptor from Florence
- Nanni Cagnone (1939–2026), Italian poet, novelist, essayist and playwright
- Nanni Galli (1940–2019), Italian former saloon, sports-car and Formula One driver
- Nanni Loy (1925–1995), Italian film, theatre and TV director
- Nanni Moretti (born 1953), Italian film director, producer, screenwriter and actor
