= Cesare Rossetti =

Italian painter

Cesare Rossetti (circa 1565-after 1623). was an Italian painter active in Rome.

He was born in Rome, and a follower of Cavalier D'Arpino, whom he assisted in decorating the Lateran Palace. He is mentioned by Giovanni Baglione in his biographies.
