= Vespasiano Strada =

Italian painter (1582–1622)

- Portrait of Vespasiano Strada by Agostino Masucci, Stockholm, Nationalmuseum
- Born: 1582; Rome, Papal States
- Died: 1622 (aged 39–40); Rome, Papal States
- Known for: Painting, engraving
- Movement: Baroque

Vespasiano Strada (1582 – 1622) was an Italian painter and engraver of the early-Baroque period, mainly active in Rome. His biography is summarized by Giovanni Baglione.

== Biography ==
Vespasiano Strada was born in Rome to Spanish parents. He is thought to have trained with the Counter-Maniera painter Ventura Salimbeni. He worked primarily in fresco and embellished several churches and public buildings in Rome with historical paintings. Notable works include the Visitation of the Virgin Mary to St. Elisabeth and the Adoration of the Shepherds, painted for the cloister of the monastery of Sant'Onofrio and the church of Santa Maria Maddalena in Campo Marzio respectively. He died in Rome at the age of thirty-six during the pontificate of Pope Paul V.

== Gallery ==
Ecce Homo, c. 1610, Cooper Hewitt, Smithsonian Design Museum, New York City

== Sources ==
- Baglione, Giovanni (1733) [1641]. Le Vite de' Pittori, Scultori, Architetti, ed Intagliatori dal Pontificato di Gregorio XII del 1572. fino a' tempi de Papa Urbano VIII. nel 1642 [Lives of the painters, sculptors, architects, and engravers during the papacies of Gregory XII in 1572 to Urban VIII in 1642]. Naples: Giovanni Battista Passari. p. 155.
- Bryan, Michael (1889). Walter Armstrong; Robert Edmund Graves (eds.). Dictionary of Painters and Engravers, Biographical and Critical. Vol. II L-Z. London: George Bell and Sons. p. 771.
