= Lattanzio Mainardi =

Italian painter

Lattanzio Mainardi (fl. 16th century) was an Italian painter of the late-Renaissance or Mannerist period. Originally from or near Bologna and is referred to as Lattanzio Bolognese by Giovanni Baglione. He painted frescoes for the Chapel of Pope Sixtus V in Santa Maria Maggiore, depicting figures like Tamar, Fares, Zara, Solomon y Boaz. He died at the age of 37 in Viterbo, while returning to Bologna.
