= Marzio di Colantonio =

Italian painter (c. 1580s – after 1623)

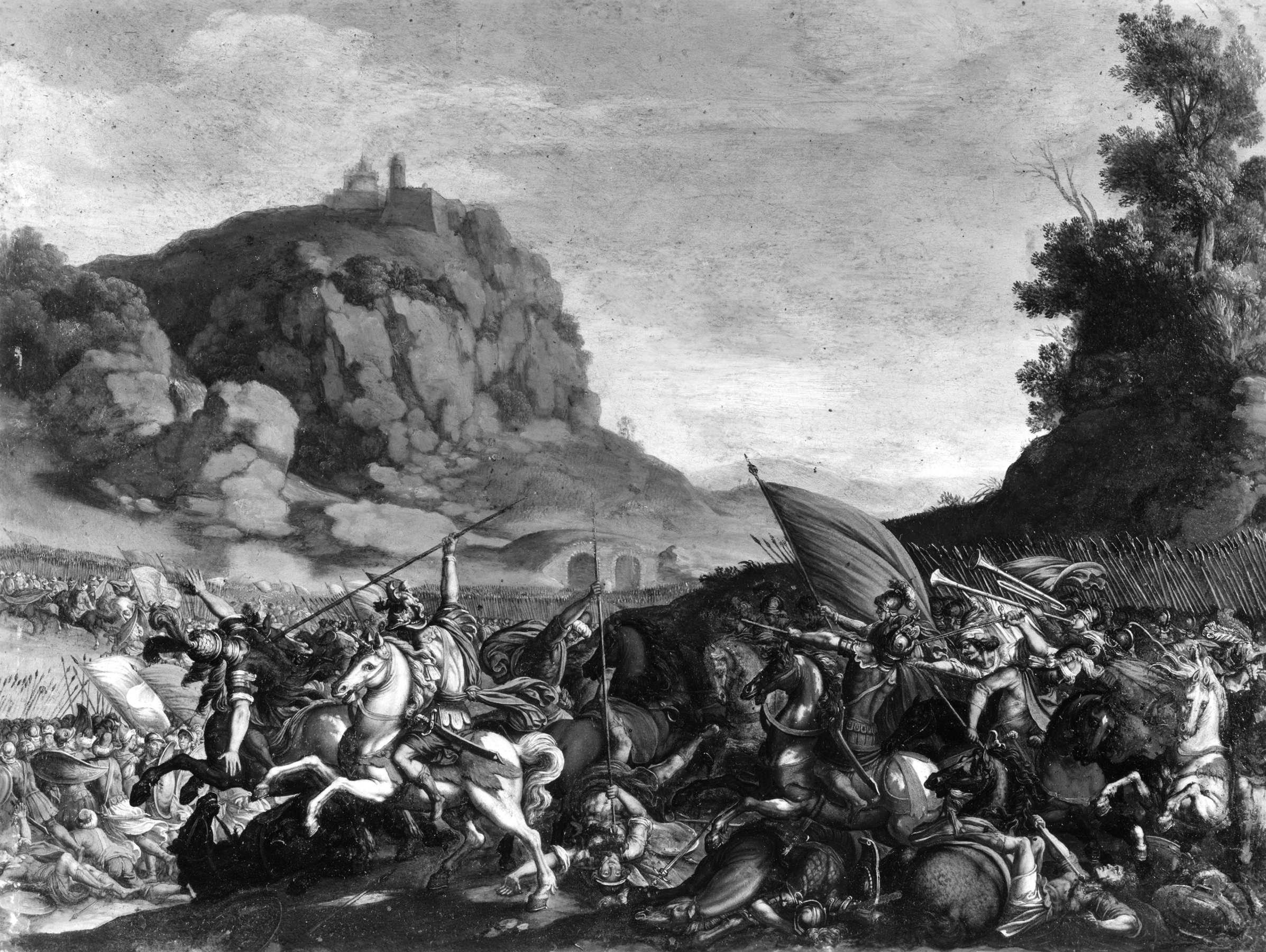
Alexander the Great in His Conquest of Asia, Walters Art Museum, 1620.

Marzio di Colantonio or di Colantonio Ganassini or di Cola Antonio (c. 1580s – after 1623) was an Italian painter, as a painter of still-lifes and landscapes, and fresco decorations of grotteschi and battle scenes with small figures. His still-life paintings contain hunted game.

== Biography ==
He was born in Rome, and trained initially under his father, a painter of Grotteschi. He is said to have then trained under Antonio Tempesta.

He painted some sacred subjects including frescoes for the church of Santa Maria della Consolazione of Rome, he was best known for his battle paintings, for which he was recruited by the Cardinal of Savoy to work for a time in Piedmont for the House of Savoy. He died young in Viterbo.

== Sources ==
- Baglione, Giovanni (1733) [1641]. Le Vite de' Pittori, Scultori, Architetti, ed Intagliatori dal Pontificato di Gregorio XII del 1572. fino a' tempi de Papa Urbano VIII. nel 1642 [Lives of the painters, sculptors, architects, and engravers during the papacies of Gregory XII in 1572 to Urban VIII in 1642]. Naples: Giovanni Battista Passari. p. 156.
- Boni, Filippo de' (1852). Biografia degli artisti ovvero dizionario della vita e delle opere dei pittori, degli scultori, degli intagliatori, dei tipografi e dei musici di ogni nazione che fiorirono da'tempi più remoti sino á nostri giorni. Seconda Edizione.. Venice; Googlebooks: Presso Andrea Santini e Figlio. p. 235.
