= Fabrizio Parmigiano =

Italian painter

Fabrizio Parmigiano was an Italian painter of the late-Baroque period. Born at Parma, he was assisted by his wife Ippolita. He specialized in landscapes.

== Bibliography ==
- Baglione, Giovanni (1733) [1641]. Le Vite de' Pittori, Scultori, Architetti, ed Intagliatori dal Pontificato di Gregorio XII del 1572. fino a' tempi de Papa Urbano VIII. nel 1642 [Lives of the painters, sculptors, architects, and engravers during the papacies of Gregory XII in 1572 to Urban VIII in 1642]. Naples: Giovanni Battista Passari. p. 86.
