= Cesare Torelli =

Italian painter (died 1615)

Cesare Torelli Romano was an Italian painter.

He was born in Rome, and a pupil of Giovanni de' Vecchi. He flourished in the pontificate of Paul V, and was employed both as a painter and a mosaicist in the library of the Vatican, and in the Scala Santa at San Giovanni in Laterano. He painted two Sibyls in the church of the Madonna dell'Orto in Venice. He died in 1615.

A sculptor of the same name was active in late 19th-century Florence, specializing in genre statuettes.

== Sources ==
- Bryan, Michael (1889). Walter Armstrong; Robert Edmund Graves (eds.). Dictionary of Painters and Engravers, Biographical and Critical. Vol. II L-Z. London: George Bell and Sons. p. 579.
- Baglione, Giovanni (1733) [1641]. Le Vite de' Pittori, Scultori, Architetti, ed Intagliatori dal Pontificato di Gregorio XII del 1572. fino a' tempi de Papa Urbano VIII. nel 1642 [Lives of the painters, sculptors, architects, and engravers during the papacies of Gregory XII in 1572 to Urban VIII in 1642]. Naples: Giovanni Battista Passari. p. 122.
