= Francesco Morelli =

French-Italian painter and engraver

Francesco Morelli (ca. 1767 – ca. 1830) was a French-Italian painter and engraver. He was active in Naples and known as a painter or engraver of Pompeian subjects.

He was born in the Franche-Comté, and then travelled to Rome. He completed a series of engravings depicting the so-called Villa of Horace in Licenza with Hackert and Luigi Sabatelli.

Another Francesco Morelli from Florence was the first and dear mentor of Giovanni Baglione.
