= Francesco Nappi =

Italian painter

The Sacrifice of Isaac, fresco in the Palazzo Mattei di Giove, Rome

Francesco Nappi (1565 – 1630s) was an Italian painter, known for his decorative frescoes in Mannerist style.

== Biography ==
He was born in Milan. He painted for one of the chapels in Santa Croce in Gerusalemme and Santa Maria della Consolazione. He died in Rome age 65.

== Sources ==
- Baglione, Giovanni (1733) [1641]. Vite de' Pittori, Scultori, Architetti, ed Intagliatori. Naples: Giovanni Battista Passari. p. 310.
