= Ambrogio Buonvicino =

Italian sculptor

Ambrogio Buonvicino (c. 1552 - 1622) was an Italian sculptor of the late-Renaissance or Mannerist period, active mainly in Rome.

He was born in Milan, and trained under Pietro Antichi. He moved to Rome around 1581. Among his works are bas-reliefs above the main door to St Peter's Basilica (Donation of the Keys to St Peter), the monument to Pope Urban VII at Santa Maria Sopra Minerva and for the Monuments to Popes Clement VIII and Paul V in the Paoline Chapel in Santa Maria Maggiore.
