= Antonio Scalvati =

Italian painter

Antonio Scalvati (1559–1619) was an Italian painter, mainly active in Rome. He was known for his portraits.

== Biography ==
Born in Bologna, Scalvati began as assistant for Tomasso Laureti, and then moved to Rome under Pope Gregory XIII.

He was employed in various projects in Rome including the Hall of Constantine in the Vatican Palace and the Vatican Library under Sixtus V. He painted portraits including of Pope Clement VIII, Leo XI, and Paul V. The portrait of Leo XI is now in the church of Sant'Agnese in Piazza Navona.

He appears to have been ill and bedridden much of his life. He died in Rome.
