= Giovanni de' Vecchi =

Italian painter (1536–1614)

Giovanni de' Vecchi (1536, Sansepolcro – 1614) was an Italian painter of the Renaissance period.

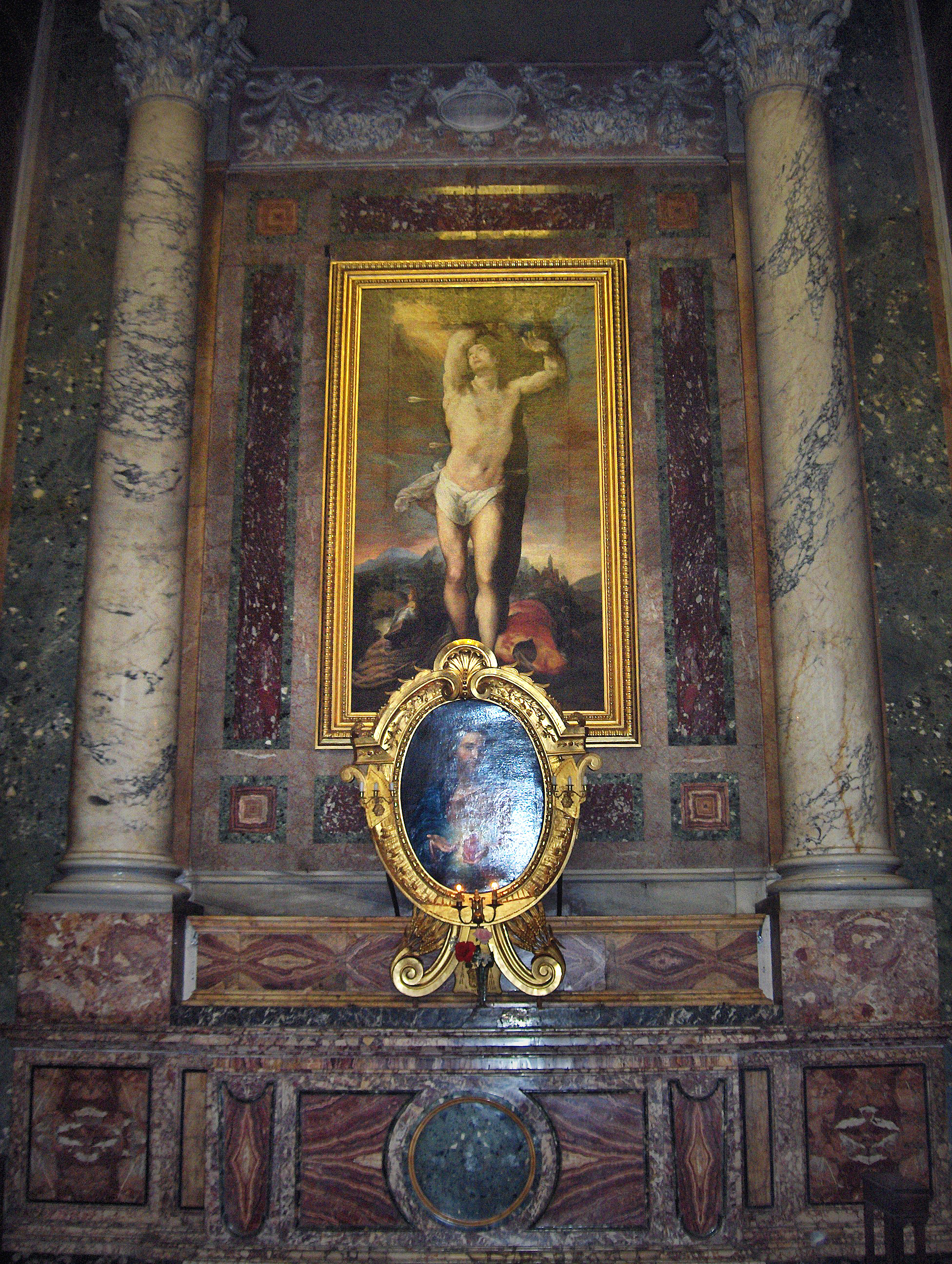
"Saint Sebastian" (1614); church Sant'Andrea della Valle, Rome

Born in Borgo San Sepolcro, He first apprenticed with the painter Raffaello del Colle, then with Taddeo Zuccari, whom he assisted in the interior decoration of the Villa Farnese at Caprarola, a major work in the Mannerist aesthetics. He also has paintings of the Life of St. Jerome in Ara Coeli which he painted for the Delfin family, and in In the cupola of the Gesu, he painted the four doctors of the church (Gregory, Ambrose, Jerome, and Augustine). The mosaics for the tribune of St. Peter's basilica with St. John and St. Luke are based on his cartoons. He also contributed to the frescoes in the Roman Oratorio del Santissimo Crocifisso.

One of his pupils was Cesare Torelli Romano.

== Sources ==
- Farquhar, Maria (1855). Ralph Nicholson Wornum (ed.). Biographical catalogue of the principal Italian painters. London: Woodfall & Kinder. pp. 193–4. "Wornum."
