= Orazio Borgianni =

Italian painter

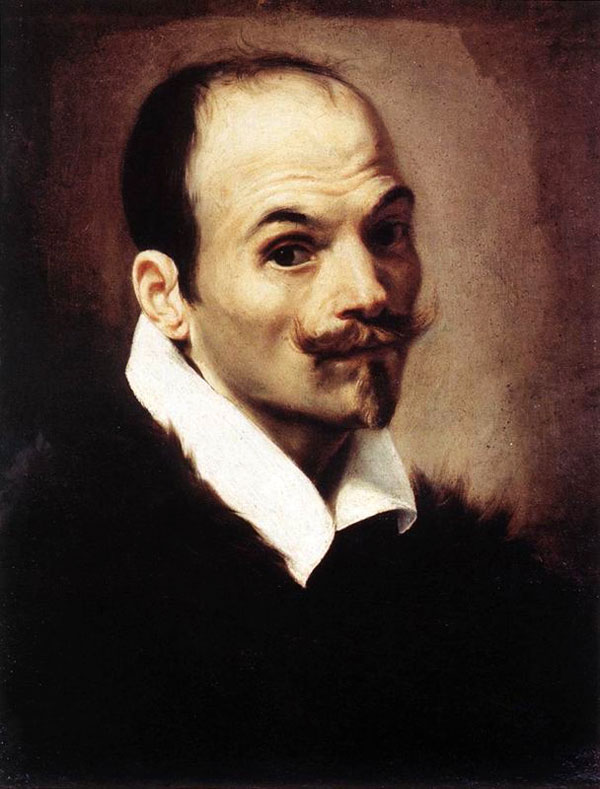
Orazio Borgianni's Self-Portrait. Oil on canvas, Galleria Nazionale d'Arte Antica, 1615

Orazio Borgianni (6 April 1574 – 14 January 1616) was an Italian painter and etcher of the Mannerist and early-Baroque periods. He was the stepbrother of the sculptor and architect Giulio Lasso.

Borgianni was born in Rome, where he was documented in February 1604. He was instructed in the art of painting by his brother, Giulio Borgianni, called Scalzo. The patronage by Philip II of Spain induced him to visit Spain, where he signed an inventory in January 1605. He returned to Rome from Spain after April 1605 at the height of his career, and most of the work of his maturity was carried out 1605–16. In Spain, he signed a petition to begin an Italianate academy of painting and executed a series of nine paintings for the Convento de Portacoeli, Valladolid, where they remain. From his time in Spain, there remain two of his paintings in the Prado Museum: St Christopher and the Stigmatization of St Francis and also an attributed selfportrait of youth. Not far from the Prado in Madrid, the Real Academia de Bellas Artes de San Fernando owns a David and Goliath.

On his return to Rome he was patronized by the Spanish ambassador, for whom he painted several pictures, and he was also employed in painting for the churches. He painted as late as 1630, after which he returned to Spain. He frescoed in the apse of the church of San Silvestro in Capite in Rome, a Martyrdom of S.Stefano I and a Messengers of Constantine call on Saint Silvestro (1610). His canvas of San Carlo Borromeo in the church of San Carlo alle Quattro Fontane (1612) is an eclectic and emotive synthesis of both Carracci and tenebrist styles. The influence of Caravaggio is also evident in a painting of the same saint (1616) now in the Hermitage Museum. A lively self-portrait of an earnest, somewhat foppish Borgianni is in the Rome Galleria Nazionale d'Arte Antica.

His early biographer was his contemporary, Giovanni Baglione, who leans heavily on anecdote. He is said to have had a temper; riding one day in a coach, at Rome, he saw some artists, among whom was Caravaggio, laughing at him; he sprang from the carriage, seized a bottle of varnish from the shop of a druggist, and threw it at the heads of the offenders.

As an engraver he etched a

- Resurrection.
- A composition of many figures; marked two Marys and St. John; dated 1615.
- St. Christopher giving his hand to the Infant Jesus.
- St. Christopher carrying the Infant on his Shoulder.
- Fifty-two Bible histories, called Raphael's Bible.
- The dead Christ, in a foreshortened position, 1615.
Selected paintings

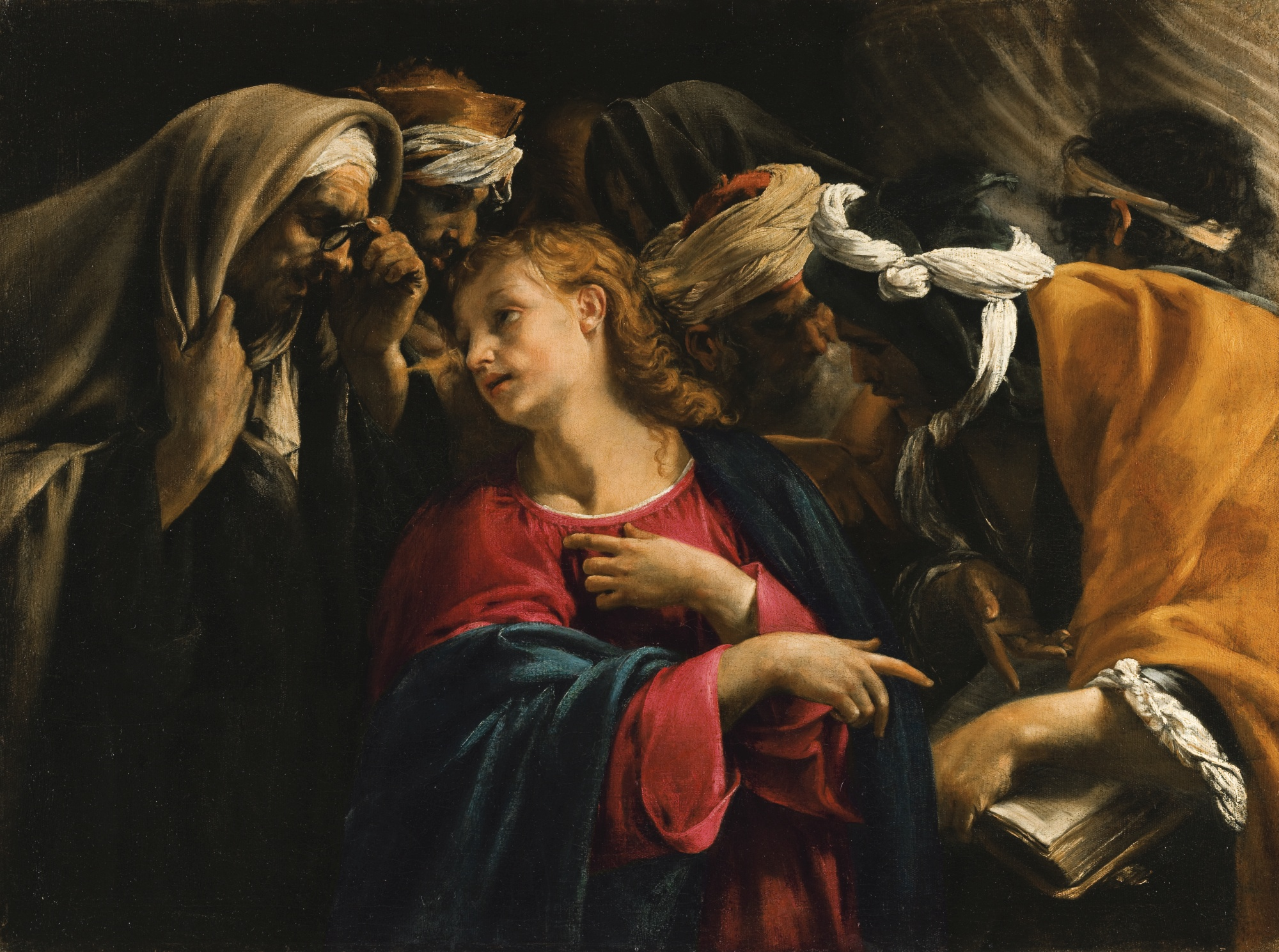
Christ amongst the Doctors

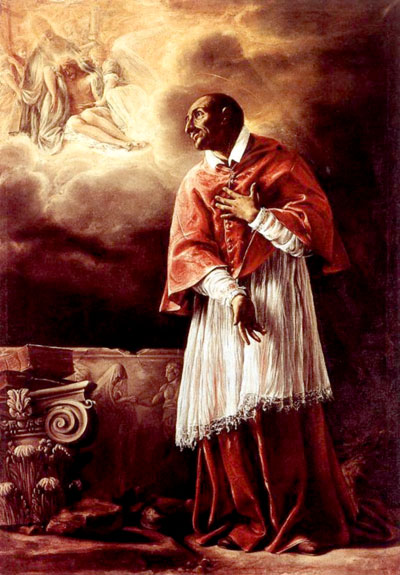
Orazio Borgianni's St. Carlo Borromeo. Oil on canvas, private collection.

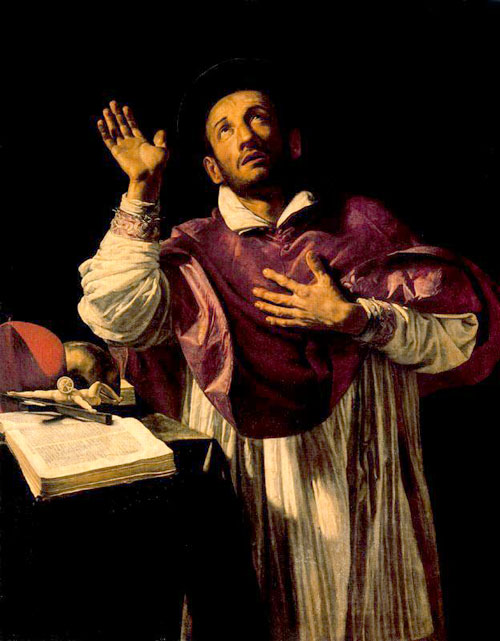
San Carlo Borromeo (between 1610 and 1616)

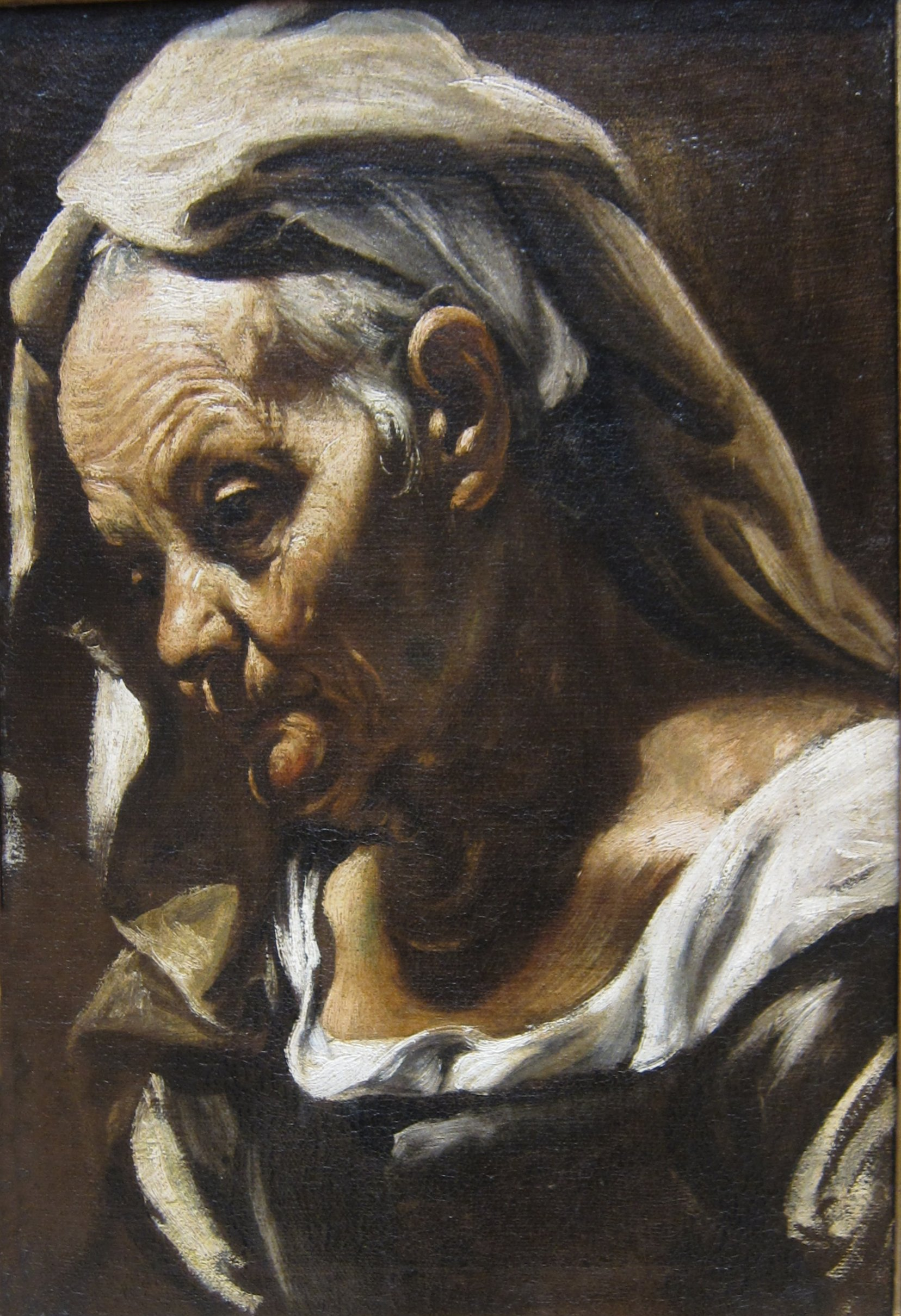
Head of an Old Woman (after 1610)

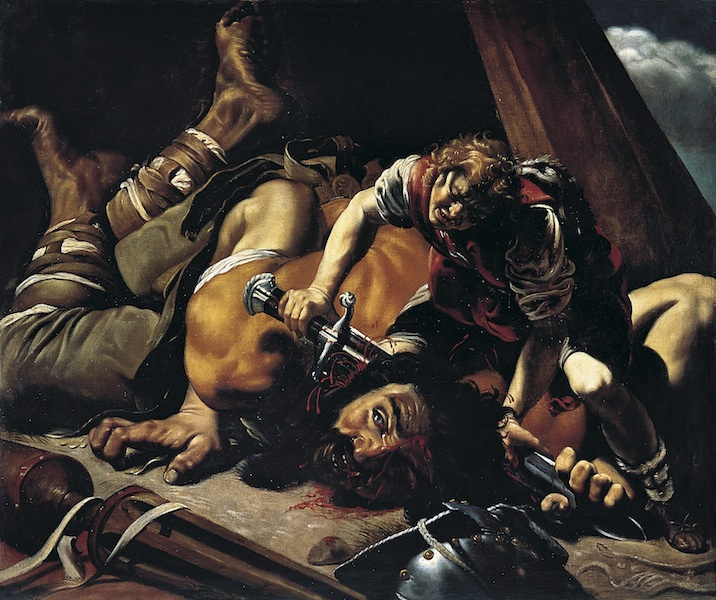
David and Goliath, Real Academia de Bellas Artes de San Fernando.

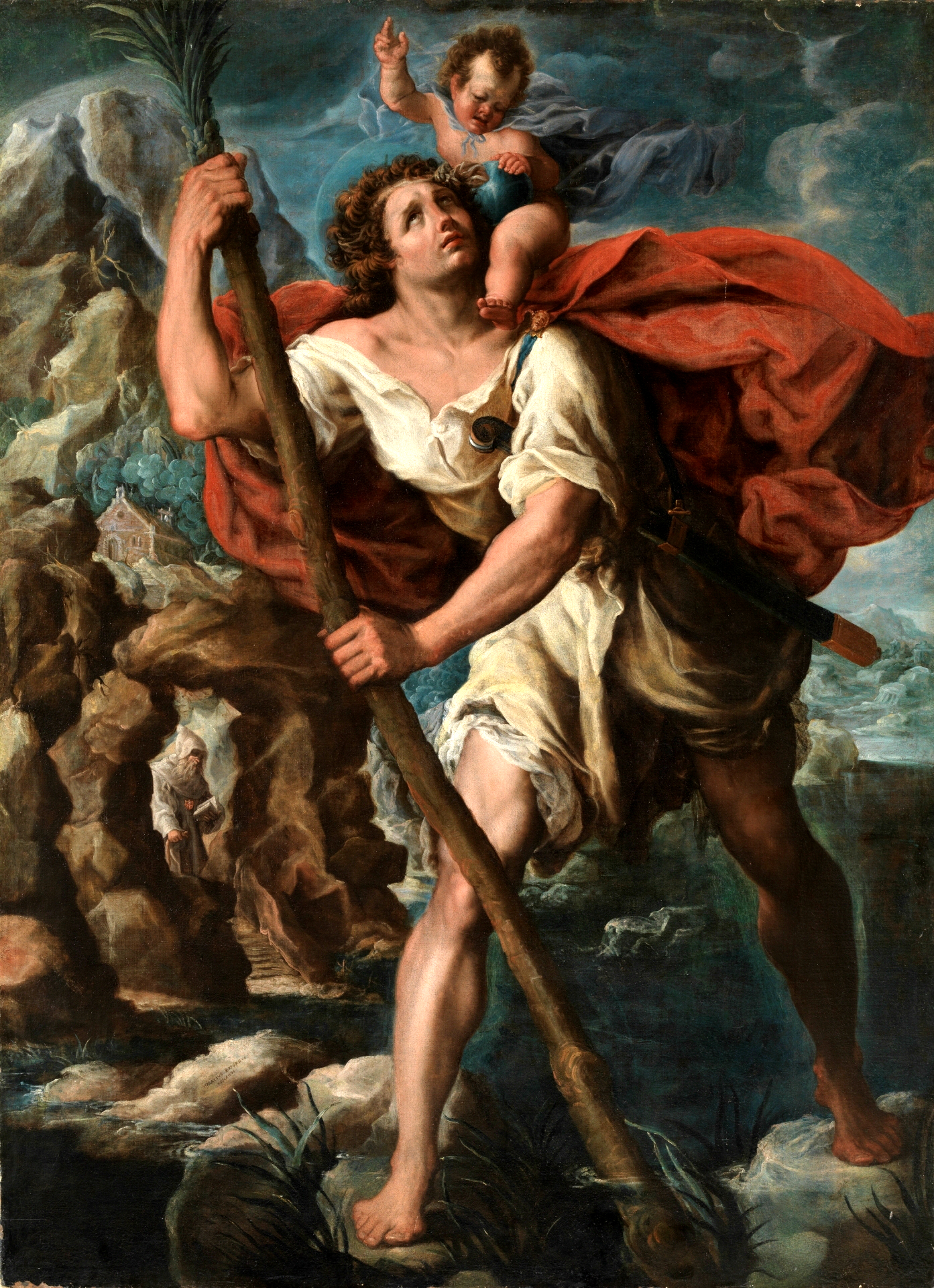
Saint Christopher, Prado Museum.
