= Girolamo Nanni =

Italian painter

Girolamo Nanni was a 17th-century Italian painter of the Baroque period, active mainly in Rome. According to Baldinucci's Notizie, he was called Girolamo Nanni Romano, also called il Poco e Buono (few and good). He is known to have frescoed in the chapel of the church of Santa Croce in Gerusalemme and in the chapel of the Assumption of the Virgin in Santa Caterina dei Funari. He painted in the chapel of the Sancta Sanctorum (Chapel of St. Lawrence) in the Lateran Palace.
