= Giovanni Baglione =

Italian painter and art historian (1566–1643)

- Engraving by Ottavio Leoni, 1625
- Born: 1566; Rome, Papal States
- Died: 30 December 1643 (aged 77); Rome, Papal States
- Known for: Painter and biographer of artists
- Movement: Late Mannerist, Baroque

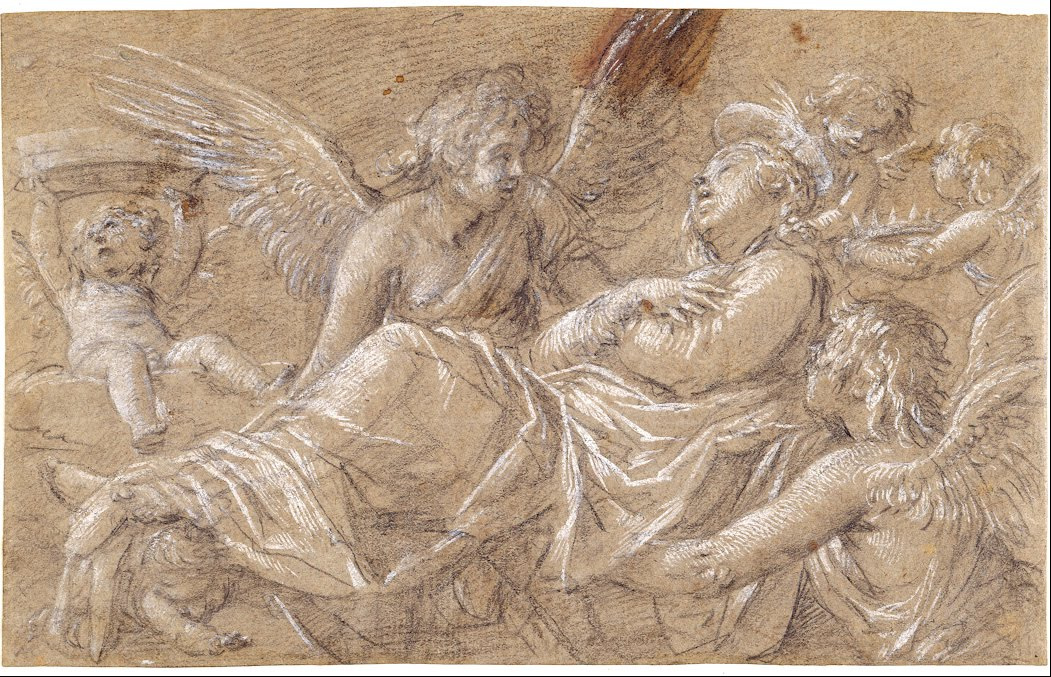
Drawing of Saint Catherine, Carried up to Heaven by Angels, c. 1625

Giovanni Baglione (Italian: [dʒoˈvanni baʎˈʎoːne]; 1566 – 30 December 1643) was an Italian Late Mannerist and Early Baroque painter and art historian. Although a prolific painter, Baglione is best remembered for his encyclopedic collection of biographies of the other artists working in Rome during his lifetime, and particularly his acrimonious relationship with the slightly younger artist Caravaggio through his art and writings.

== Life ==
He was born and died in Rome, but from his own account came from a noble family of Perugia. A pupil of the obscure Florentine artist working in Rome, Francesco Morelli (not to be confused with the later French-Italian engraver Francesco Morelli), he worked mainly in Rome, initially with a late-Mannerist style influenced by Giuseppe Cesari (or the "Cavaliere d'Arpino"). After an intermezzo Caravaggesco when he was heavily influenced by the young Caravaggio in the early years of the new century, and a Bolognese-influenced phase in the 1610s, Baglione's final style became more generalized and typical of Roman Early Baroque painters such as Guercino, though always reflecting his training in the Central Italian tradition of disegno, the absence of which he criticized in the Caravaggisti. To Rudolf Wittkower, his style "vacillated between progressive trends, without absorbing them fully".

He spent 1621–1622 in Mantua as the court artist of Duke Ferdinando Gonzaga, where the exposure to the fabulous Gonzaga collection of Venetian paintings influenced his style. Otherwise he remained in Rome, where he was long successful in attracting commissions from the Papal court and aristocracy. His paintings have been described by the art historian Steven F. Ostrow as "extraordinarily uneven, at best, competent, and his work pales in comparison with that of many of the contemporary artists he emulated", while his "chalk and pen and ink drawings reveal a force and lyricism rarely found in his paintings". The quality of his work declined sharply in the 1630s, by which time he was in his late sixties.

He had a successful career, receiving a Papal knighthood in the Supreme Order of Christ (the highest of the Papal orders) in 1606, and his long involvement with Rome's Accademia di San Luca and his biographies reveal "an artist obsessed with status". He was a member of the Accademia from 1593 until his death, and three times President. Apart from the regular later title of "first historian of the Roman Baroque", in his lifetime he was also nicknamed Il Sordo del Barozzo as he suffered from deafness. He died in Rome on 30 December 1643 at the age of 77.

== Writings ==
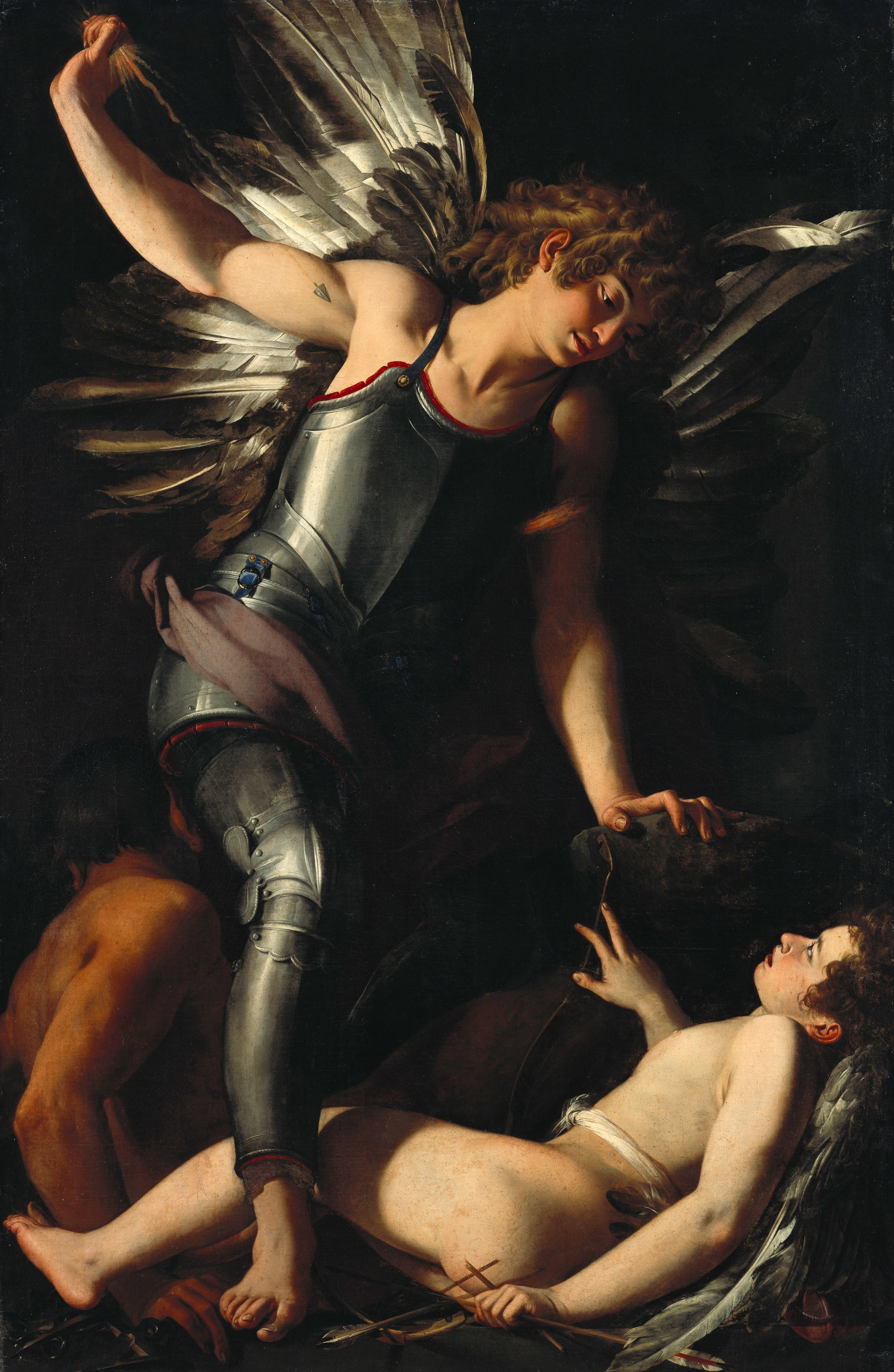
Giovanni Baglione, Sacred Love and Profane Love (c. 1602–03), Oil on canvas, Gemäldegalerie, Berlin

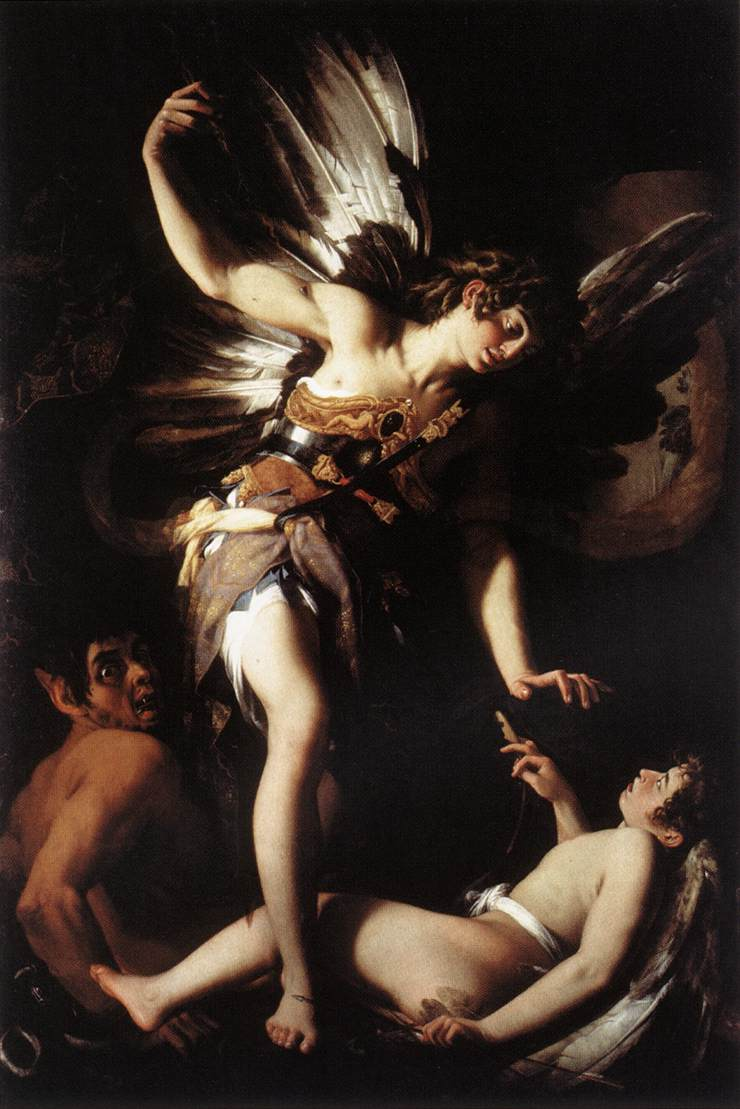
Giovanni Baglione, Sacred Love and Profane Love, 1602. Oil on canvas, 240 × 143 cm. Rome, Galleria Nazionale d'Arte Antica di Palazzo Barberini.

He published two books, The nine churches of Rome (Le nove chiese di Roma 1639), and The Lives of Painters, Sculptors, Architects and Engravers, active from 1572–1642 (Le Vite de' Pittori, scultori, architetti, ed Intagliatori dal Pontificato di Gregorio XII del 1572. fino a' tempi de Papa Urbano VIII. nel 1642, 1642). The latter is still seen as an important historical source for artists living in Rome during the lifetime of Baglione. His first book was an artistic guide to Rome's nine major pilgrimage churches, which is notable for its period in taking an interest in the works of all periods, and remains useful to scholars as an account of these churches at a point before many subsequent alterations. It "marks a watershed in the guidebook literature of Rome-the turning point between the older tradition of devotional guidebooks ... and the modern tradition of artistic guides".

His biographies cover over two hundred artists in various media, all of whom had worked in Rome and were dead by the time he published. Relatively few other sources, other than contracts and the like, exist for most of these figures, and Baglione's work often remains the basis for their biographies, being drawn on extensively by Bellori, Passeri and others, as well as modern writers. Baglione had known a large number of his subjects personally and his attributions and basic factual information is considered generally reliable, although like Vasari and most intervening biographers of artists, he sometimes repeats anecdotes uncritically. He carefully notes information about the social status and progress of his subjects, and is often very quick to criticise and moralize over human failings and bad habits. He "recorded all signs of social status, including houses, dress, collections, permission to wear a sword, splendid funerals, and tombs." Similarly, he never failed to mention if an artist was a member of his beloved Academy of St. Luke, had been elected to the Virtuosi del Pantheon, had been knighted, had been well paid for his work, or had been employed by noble patrons. And the corollary to this is Baglione's delight in recognizing artists as virtuosi, not simply as an expression of their artistic ability but in reference to their possessing literary, musical, or dramaturgical skills. Running throughout Le vite, in other words, is an abiding concern with the honor of the profession-with the elevated status and nobilta of the artist as gentleman." As far as possible, his descriptions of works concentrated on those accessible to the public.

== Litigation against Caravaggio ==
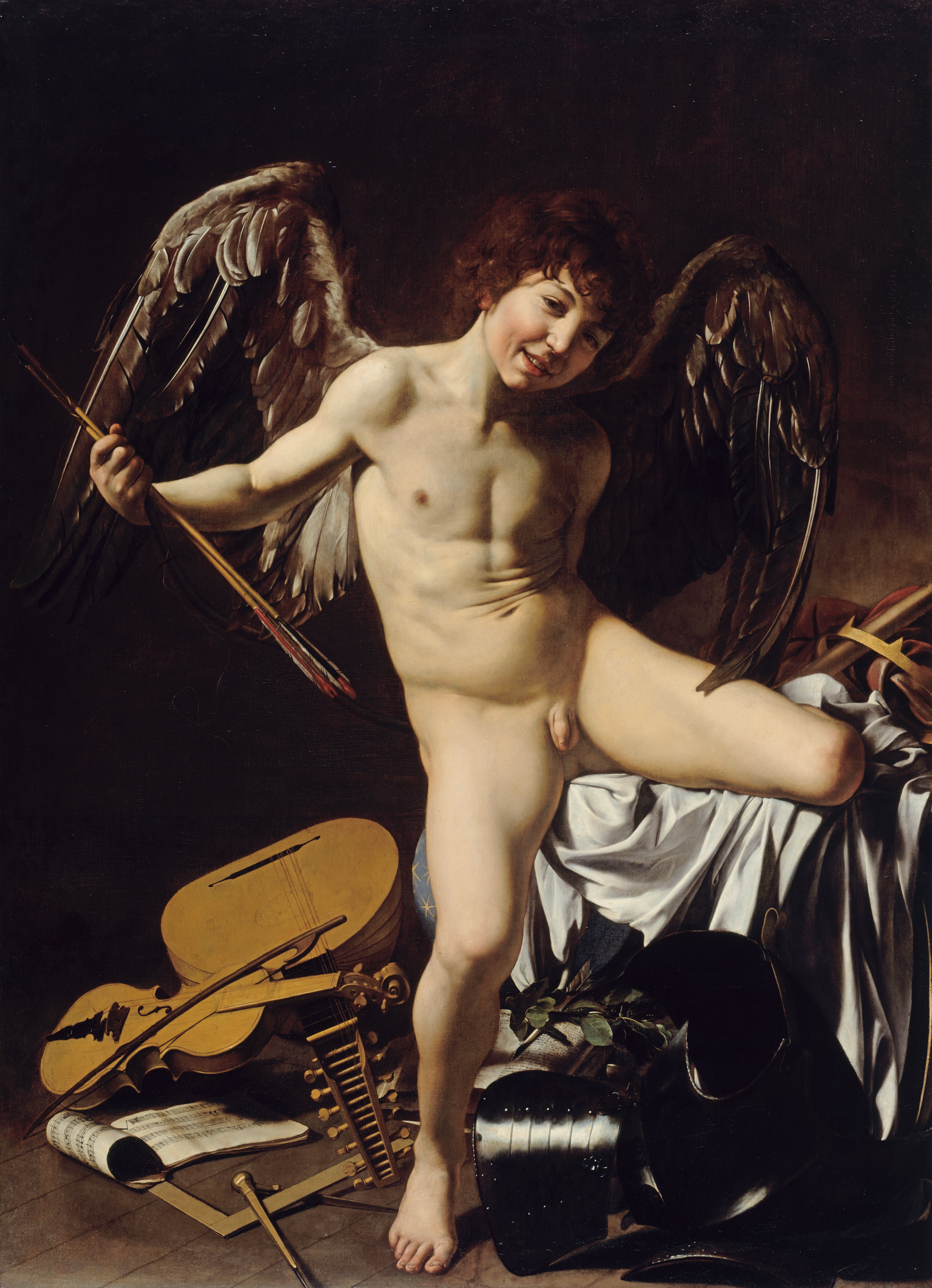
Michelangelo Merisi da Caravaggio, Amor Vincit Omnia, c. 1602. Oil on canvas, 156.5 × 113.3 cm. Gemäldegalerie, Berlin.

Baglione's best known painting, Sacred Love and Profane Love (or The Divine Eros Defeats the Earthly Eros and other variants), was a direct response to Caravaggio's Amor Vincit Omnia (1601–02). Baglione's painting exists in two versions, the earlier in the Gemäldegalerie, Berlin (c. 1602–03) and the later in the Galleria Nazionale d'Arte Antica at Palazzo Barberini in Rome. Both show Sacred Love as an angelic winged figure interrupting a 'meeting' between Cupid (Profane Love), shown as in the Caravaggio as a smaller and naked winged figure, and the Devil. In the later Rome version the devil is portrayed with the caricatured features of Caravaggio, while in Berlin his face is turned away. Both paintings were commissioned by members of the Giustiniani family in Rome: the Caravaggio by the banker and collector Marchese Vincenzo Giustiniani, and Baglione's riposte by his brother Cardinal Benedetto Giustiniani. What in the two brothers was probably a good-natured family joke reflected serious rivalry between the artists concerned. Baglione was greatly influenced by the style of Caravaggio during this period of his career, and the younger artist and his circle had claimed, with some justification, that Baglione had plagiarized his style.

In late August 1603 Baglione filed a suit for libel against Caravaggio, Orazio Gentileschi, Ottavio Leoni, and Filipo Trisegni in connection with some unflattering poems circulated around Rome over the preceding summer, which he appears to have been correct in attributing to Caravaggio's circle. Baglione had recently completed his large altarpiece of the Resurrection of Jesus for Il Gesu, the main church of the Jesuit Order (it was much later replaced), and claimed that Caravaggio was jealous of this important commission. Caravaggio's testimony during the trial as recorded in court documents is one of the few documented records of his thoughts about art and his contemporaries. It included statements that: "I don't know any painter who thinks Giovanni Baglione is a good painter", the Resurrection altarpiece was "clumsy [goffa]" and "it's the worst he's done, and I haven't heard a single painter praise the said painting." Caravaggio was found guilty and held in the Tor di Nona prison for two weeks after the trial, but far from clearing his reputation, Caravaggio's damaging remarks have dominated the critical assessment of Baglione ever since, although Gentileschi's evidence conceded that he was a "first-class painter". Years after Caravaggio's early death in 1610, Baglione was his first biographer, and though he gave him much praise for his early works, his dislike is evident, concentrated on the younger artist's life and character and his later paintings; this verdict, especially as regards the man, has also remained highly influential.

== Paintings ==
He was mainly a painter of religious subjects, reflecting the Roman market, but also painted several mythological subjects, including an "astonishing" Venus whipped by Love (1620s) with an unusually suggestive pose, accentuated by strong chiaroscuro, for the plump goddess, who is viewed foreshortened from behind as she lies on a bed.

He was employed in many of the considerable numbers of church commissions in Rome during the pontificates of Clement VIII, Paul V and Urban VIII in the early years of the new century, from which the Caravaggisti were largely excluded. The two largest churches being filled with paintings at this period were St. Peter's Basilica, where his Saint Peter Raising Tabitha from the Dead (1607) earned his knighthood from Paul V, and Santa Maria Maggiore, where his frescoes can be seen in the Cappella Borghese. For the church of Santa Maria dell'Orto he painted a number of works in both fresco and oils, including a fresco cycle of scenes from the Life of the Virgin, a Saint Sebastian and other saints. A Last Supper is in San Nicola in Carcere. There is a Saint Stephen in the Cathedral at Perugia, and in that of Loreto a Saint Catherine. The Giustizia (Justice) hall at the Rocca dei Rossi was completely frescoed by Baglione. A series of paintings of Apollo and the Muses is in Arras.

== Gallery ==
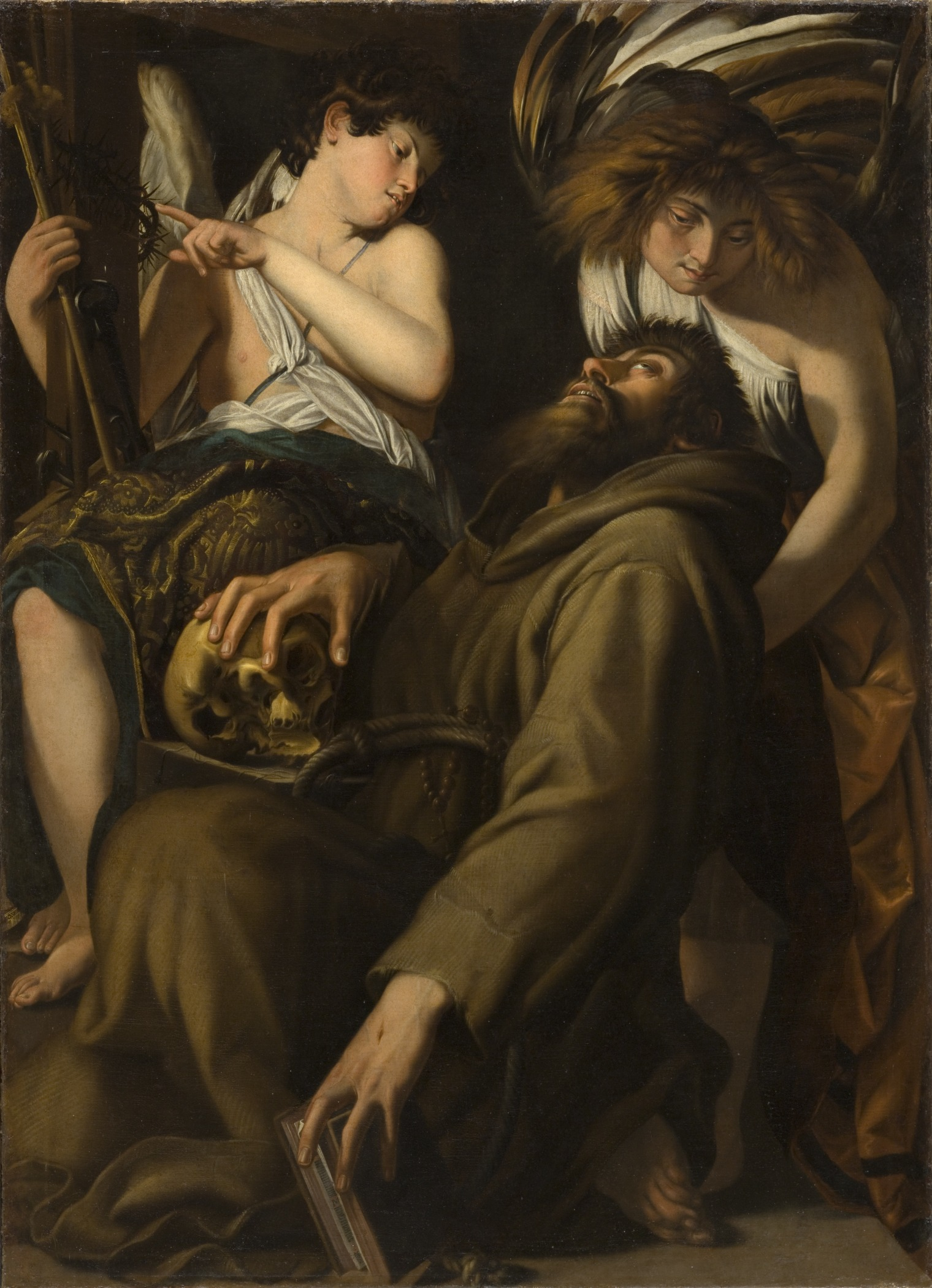
The Ecstasy of St Francis, 1601, Art Institute of Chicago

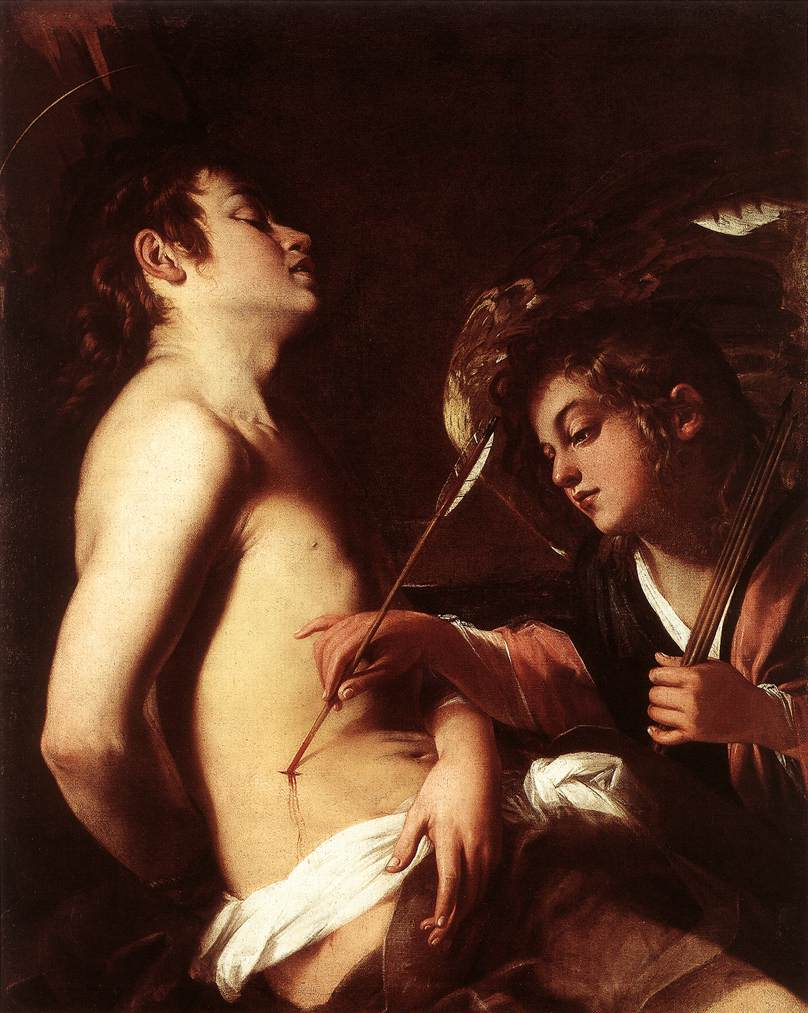
Saint Sebastian healed by an angel, c. 1603, private collection

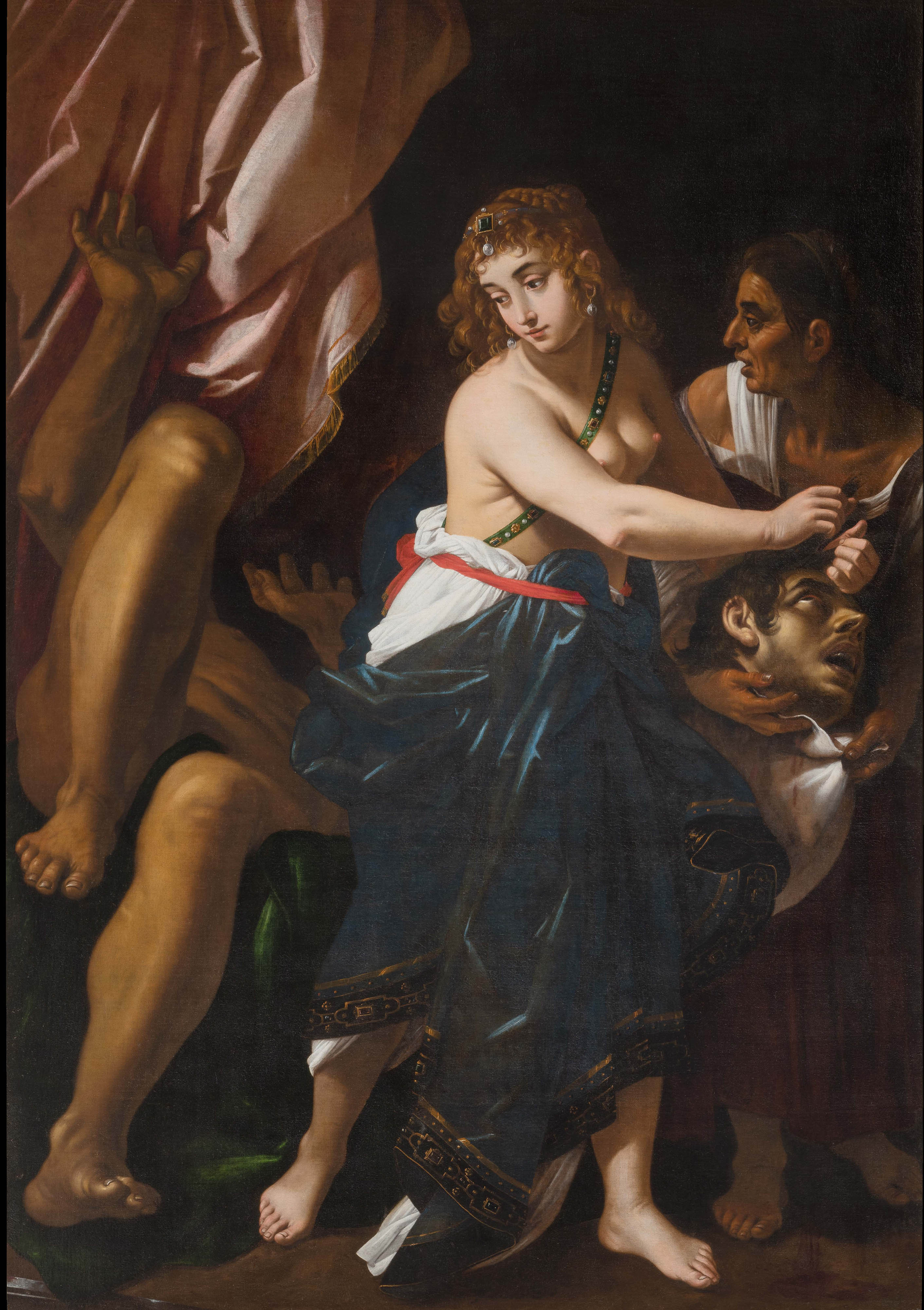
Judith and the Head of Holofernes, 1608, Galleria Borghese

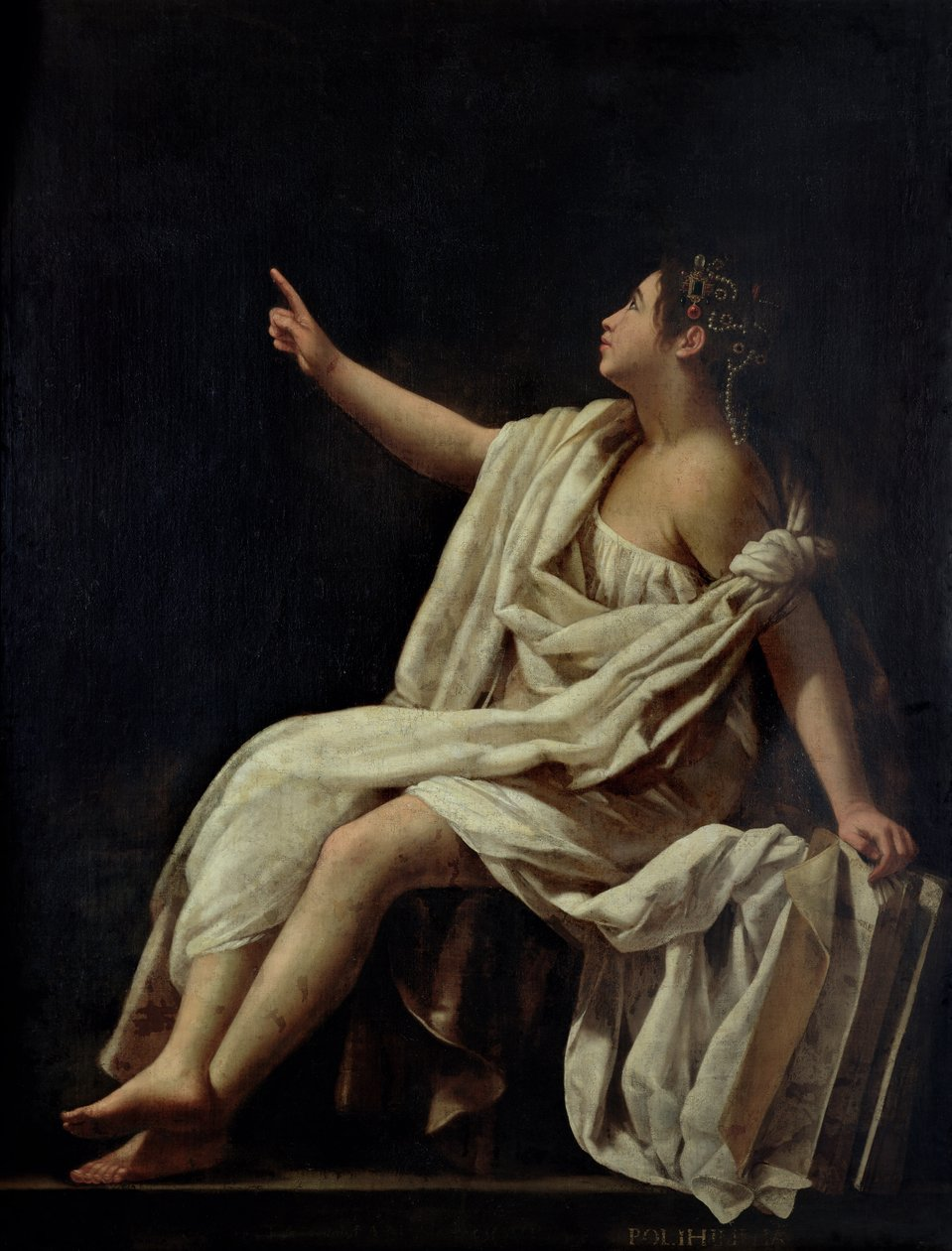
Polyhymnia (from the series Apollo and the Muses, 1621-1623)

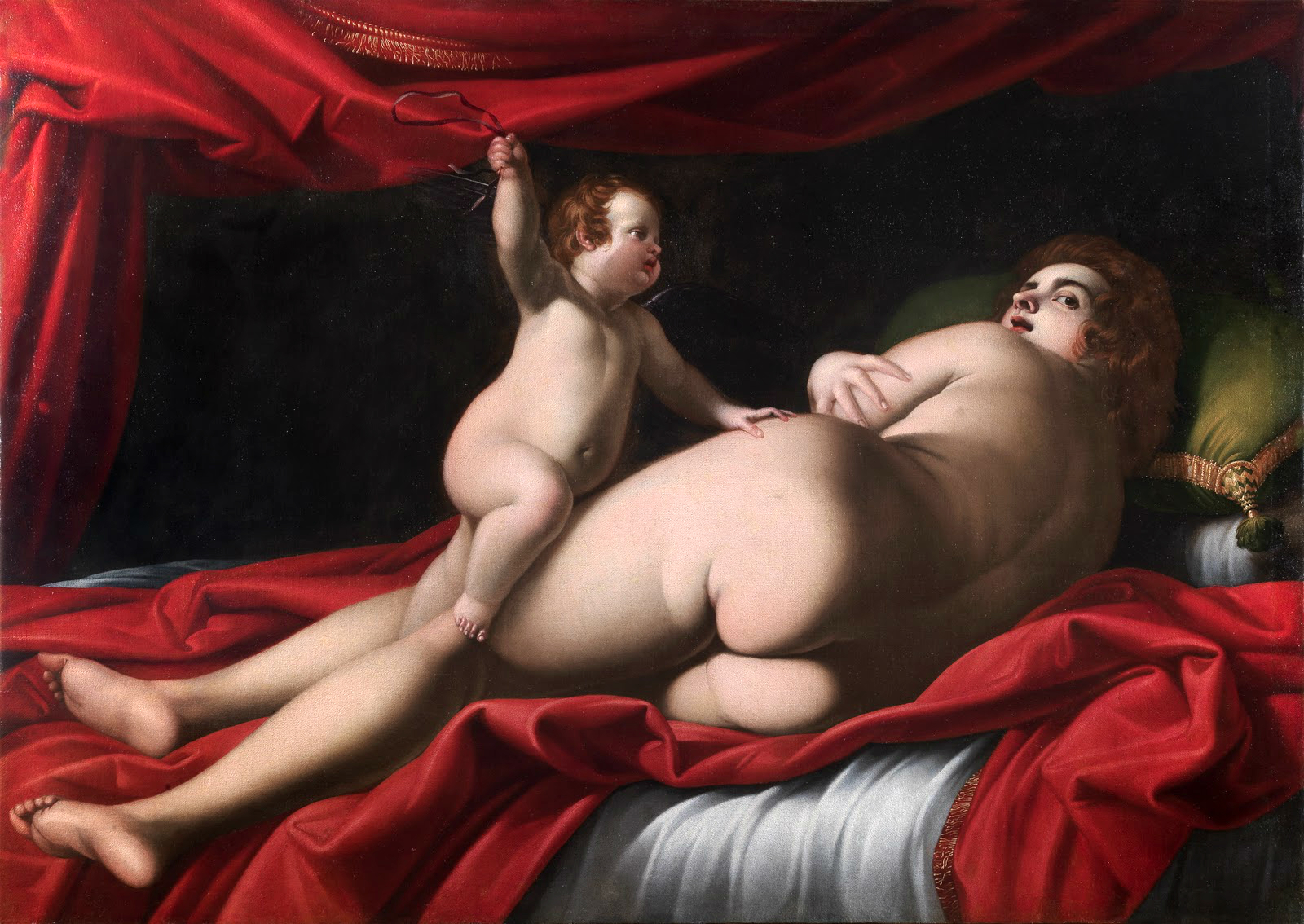
Cupid beating Venus, 1600-1615, Zeri priv. col.

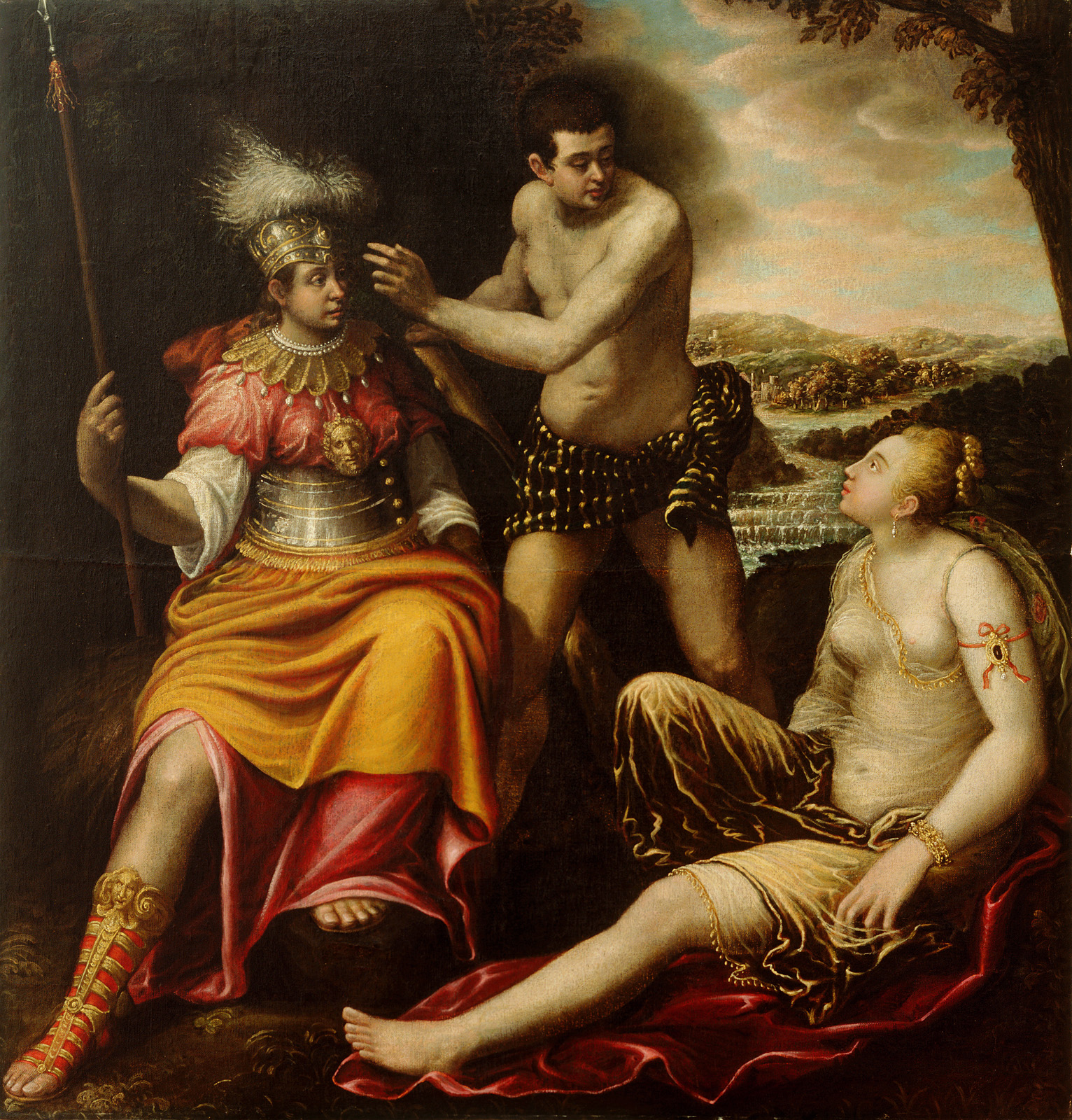
Hercules at the crossroads, 1640-1642, National Gallery of Slovenia, Ljubljana

== See also ==
- Artists in biographies by Giovanni Baglione
- Sacred-profane dichotomy
