= Santa Maria ai Monti =

Church of St. Mary of the Mounts Santa Maria ai Monti (in Italian) S. Mariæ ad Montes (in Latin) Santa Maria ng Kabundukan (in Tagalog)
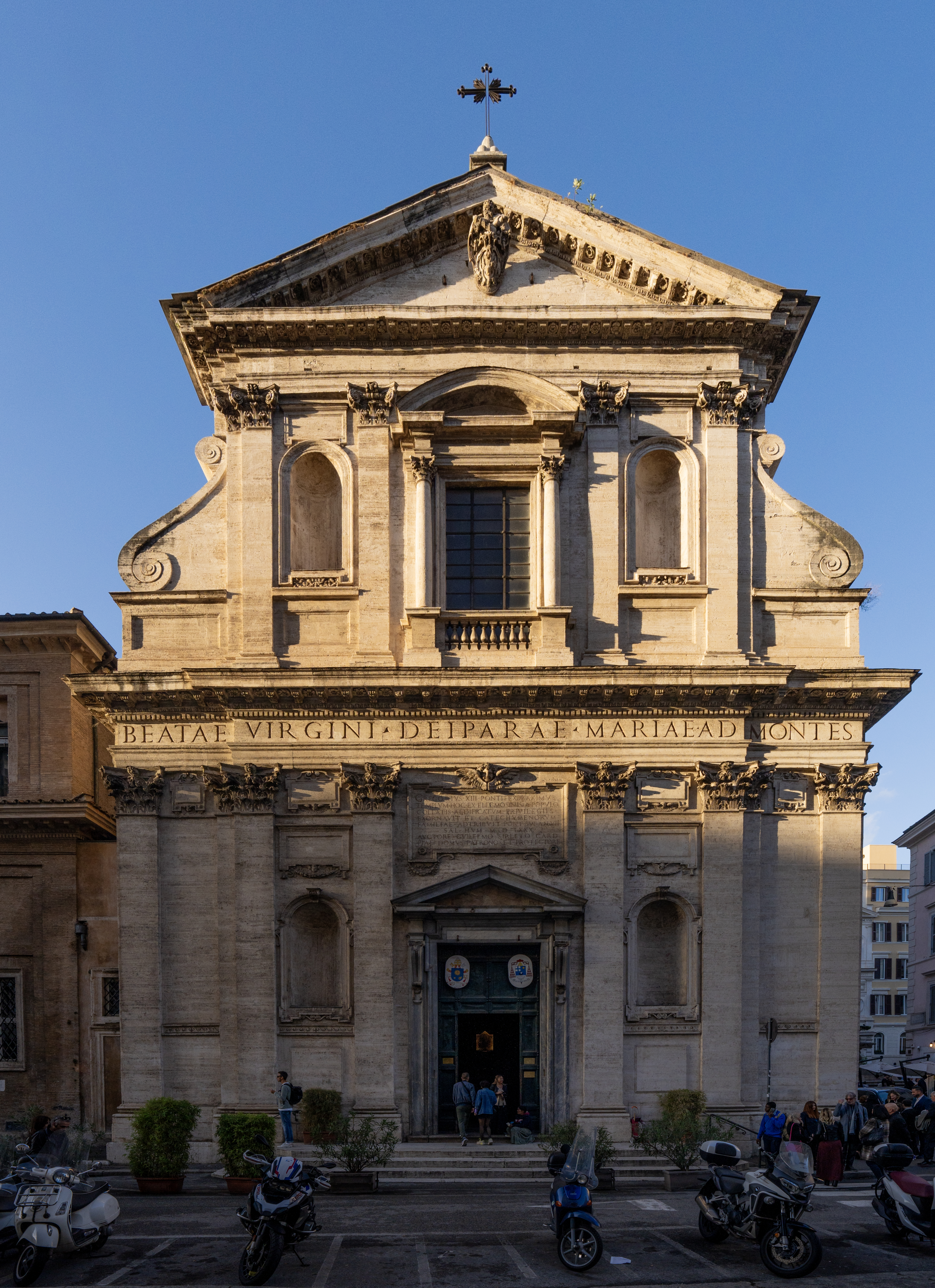
- Santa Maria ai Monti
- Click on the map to see marker
- 41°53′41″N 12°29′26″E
- Location: Via della Madonna dei Monti 41, Rome, Italy
- Country: Italy
- Language: Italian
- Denomination: Catholic
- Tradition: Roman Rite
- Website: santamariaaimonti.it

History
- Status: Titular church, parish church
- Dedication: Mary, mother of Jesus
- Consecrated: 1580

Architecture
- Architect(s): Giacomo della Porta, Carlo Lombardi, Flaminio Ponzio
- Style: Baroque
- Completed: 1580

Santa Maria dei Monti (also known as Madonna dei Monti or Santa Maria ai Monti) is a cardinalatial titular church, located at 41 Via della Madonna dei Monti, at the intersection with Via dei Serpenti, in the rione Monti of Rome, Italy. The church is dedicated to the Blessed Virgin Mary.

== History ==
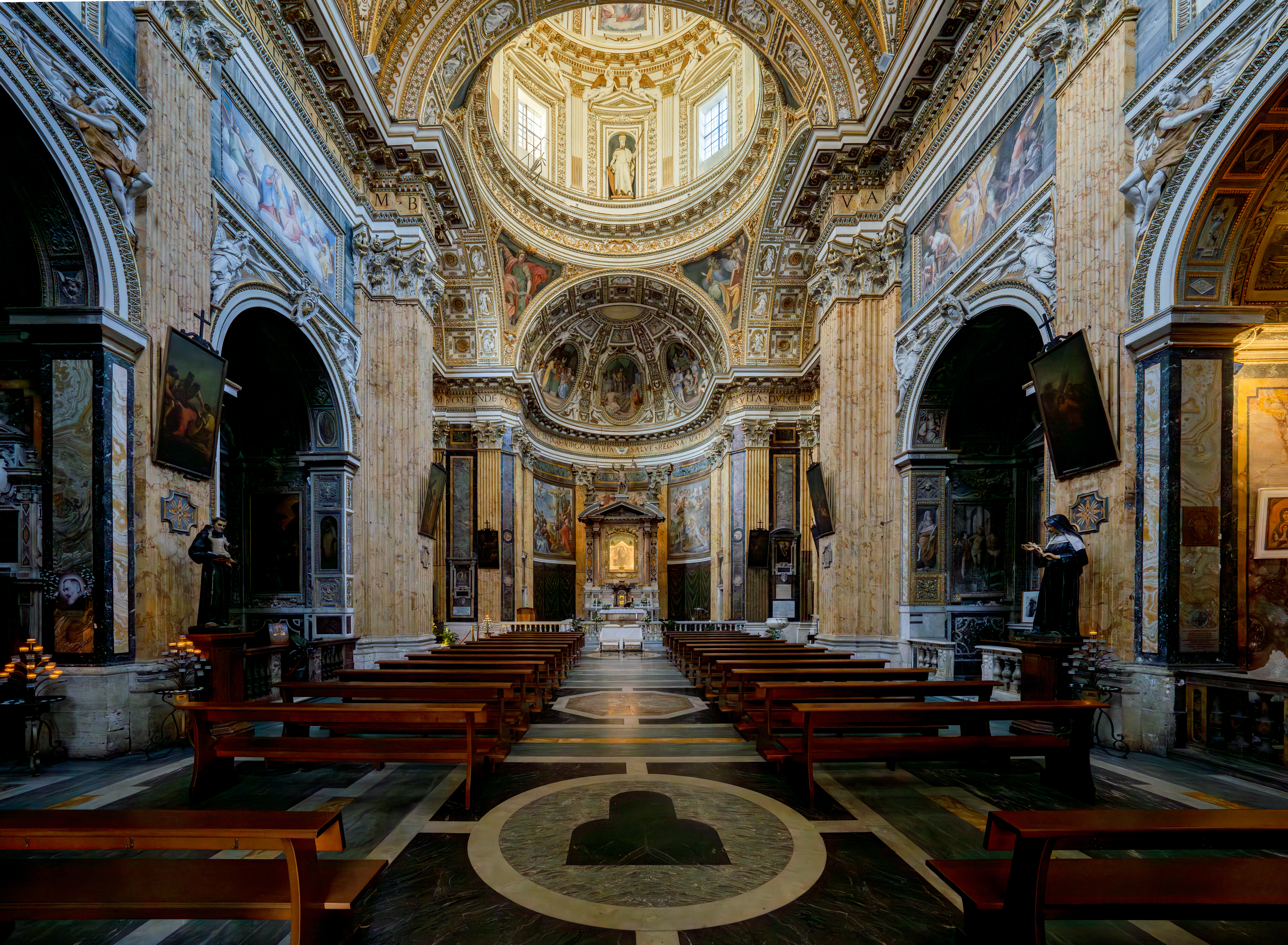
Interior

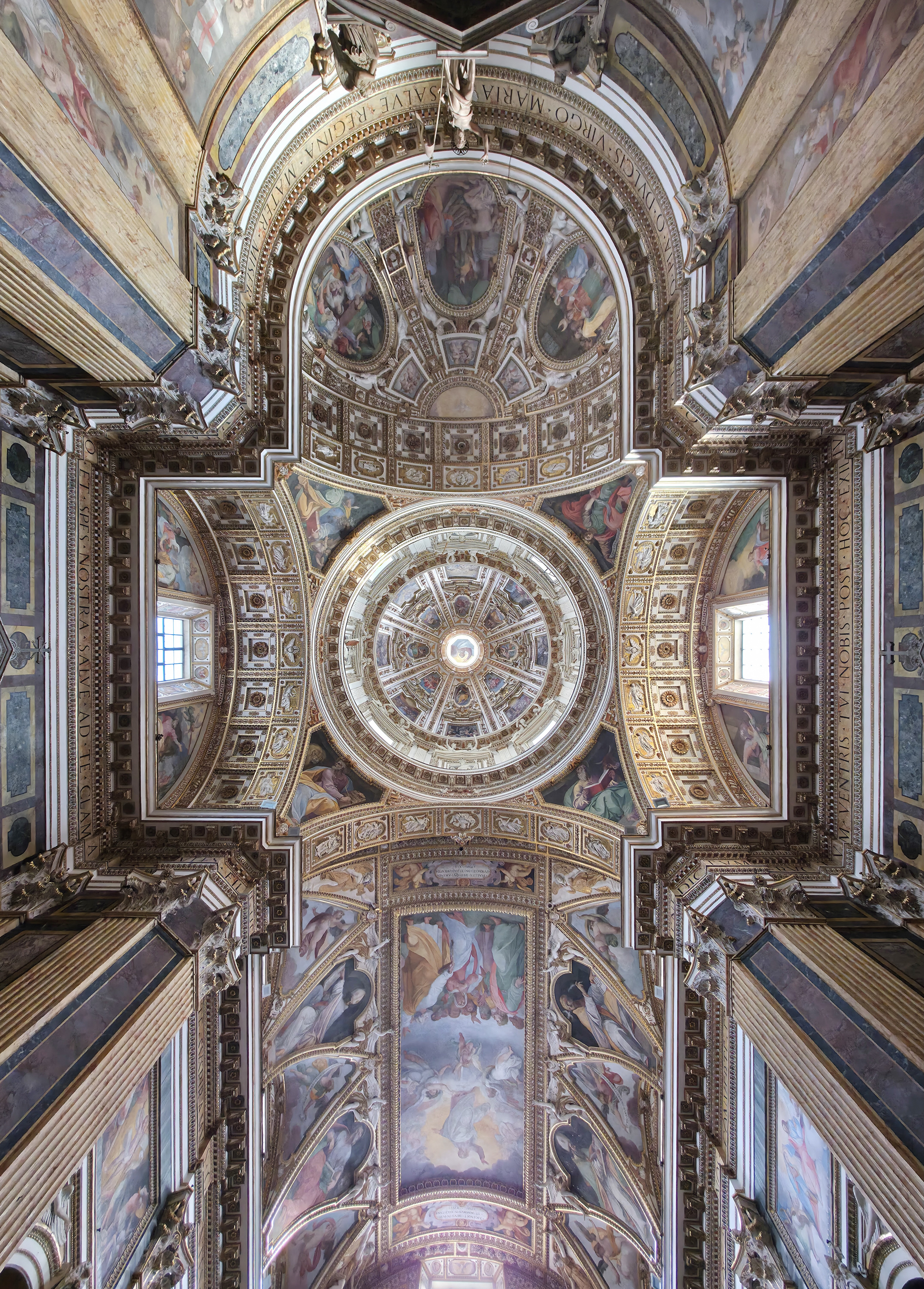
Church ceiling and dome

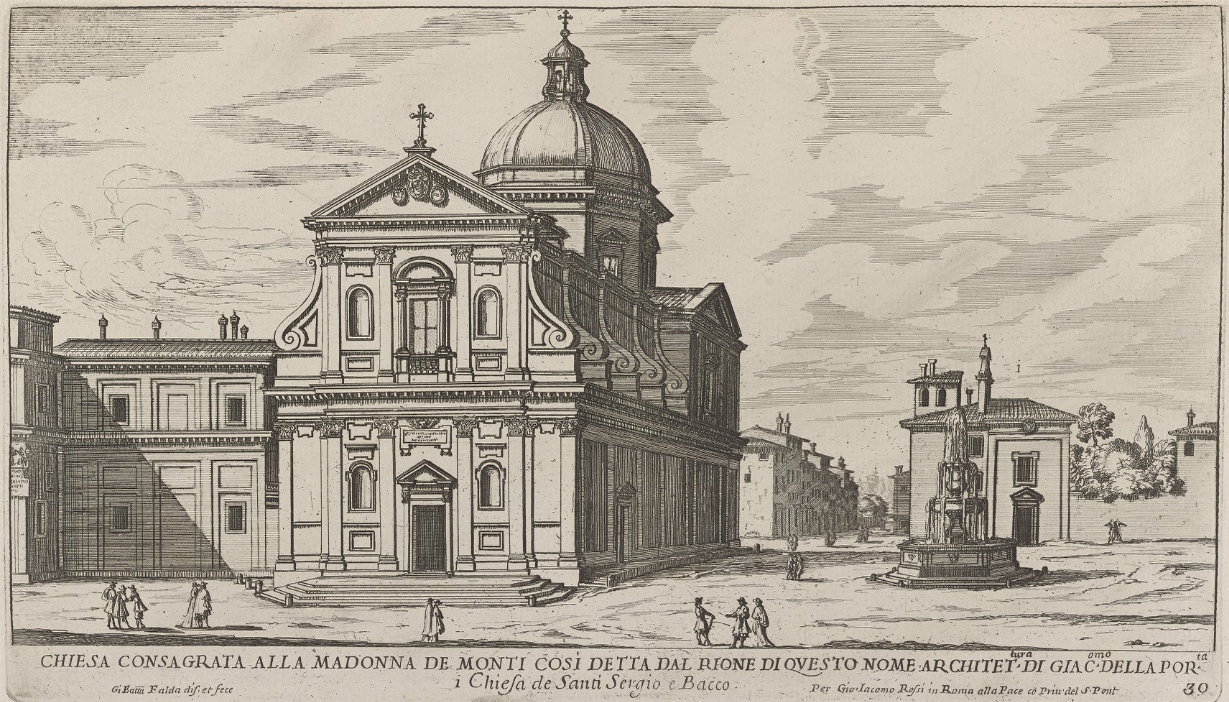
View of the church in the 17th century (Giovanni Battista Falda, c.1667–69)

Situated on the sloping terrain above the ancient forums of Rome, near the present Via Cavour, by the 14th century, a convent associated with the Clarissan order was located at or near the site. When these nuns abandoned the site to move to San Lorenzo in Panisperna, a frescoed 15th-century image of the Virgin and child with Saints Lawrence and Stephen was uncovered at their former monastery in 1580. Soon the icon was celebrated as miraculous, and became an object of popular veneration, and led Pope Gregory XIII to sponsor the construction of this church. The icon still is displayed over the high altar. A copy is taken in procession through the streets on 26 April each year.

In the late 16th-century church was placed under the administration of the Company of the Catecumeni, sponsored by Cardinal Sirlotta. This order ministered to those converting from Judaism and Islam to Catholicism, and staffed the Collegio de Neofiti. In 1634, cardinal Antonio Barberini built the Palazzo dei Neofiti for students of the Collegio next door to the church. In the 18th-century, the purpose of the college would change and be assigned by Pope Clement XI to the Pio Operai.

The church was designed by Giacomo della Porta with a façade inspired by his prior work of the Church of the Gesù. It has two rows of Corinthian pilasters that are connected with volutes. (The façade was renovated in 1991–92) Above the door is a dedicatory inscription and votive niches. The work was continued by Carlo Lombardi and Flaminio Ponzio. Original to this phase are the statues by Giovanni Anguilla of the four major prophets of the Old Testament in the niches of the dome (1599).

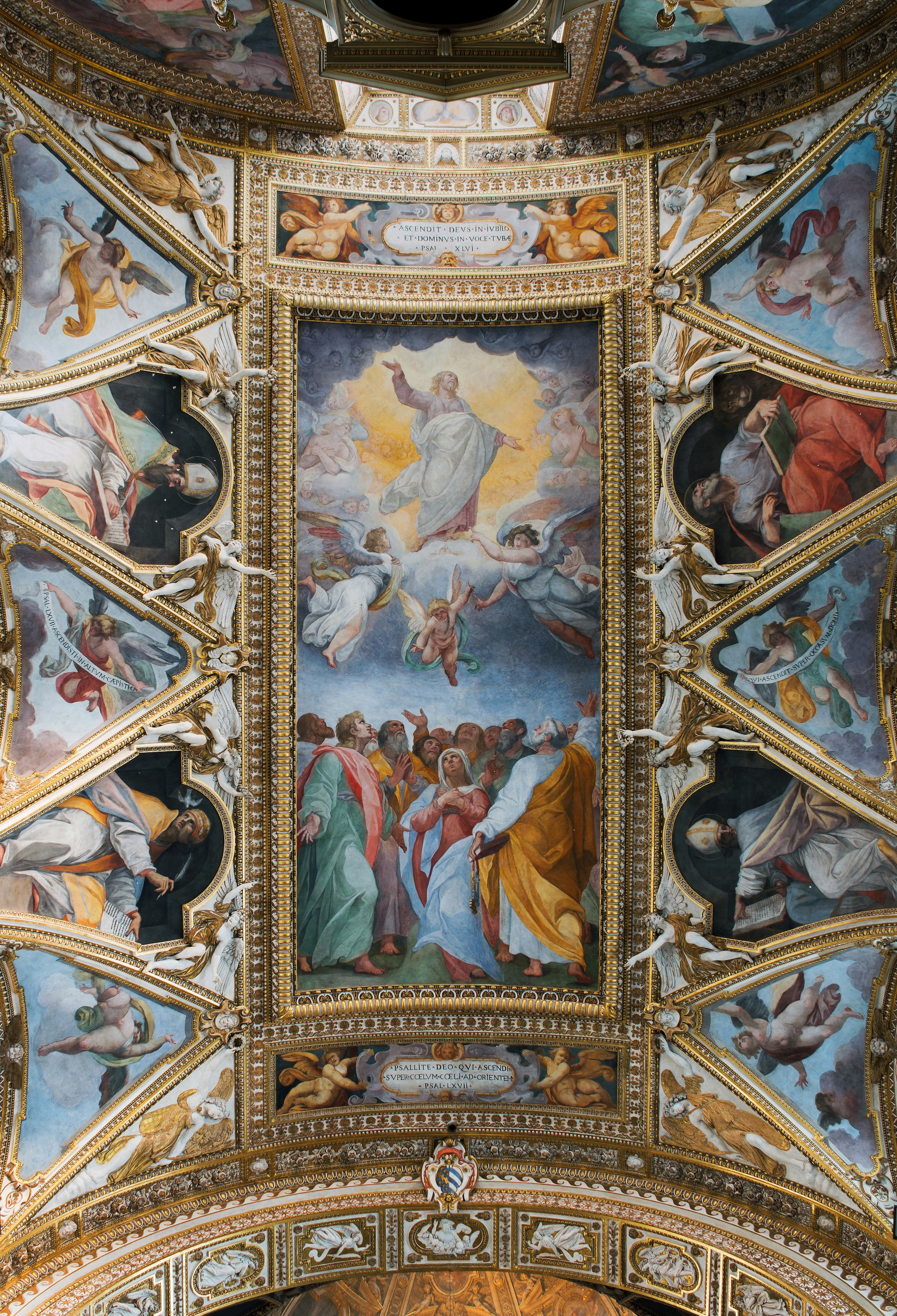
Ceiling frescos depicting the Ascension, several Angels and Doctors of the Church

The apse was decorated by Giacinto Gimignani and Cristoforo Casolani. The latter also produced the frescoes of the four Evangelists in the dome and the ceiling fresco in the nave depicting The Ascension, Angels and Doctors of the Church (1624). In each of the eight sections of the dome are scenes from the life of the Blessed Virgin by several artists, while in the vault and the arches of the chapels are stucco angels by Ambrogio Buonvicino. In the first chapel to the right are frescoes of the story of San Carlo Borromeo and a Madonna and child with the saint (1624) by Giovanni da San Giovanni. The third chapel has a Walk to Calvary by Paris Nogari. The main altar has a Madonna with child with saints Stephen & Lorenzo from the early 15th century. In the third chapel on the left, is a Nativity by Girolamo Muziano, flanked by an Adoration of the Magi and Dream of St John both by Cesare Nebbia. In the first chapel to the left (north) is an Annunciation (1588) by Durante Alberti.

Benedict Joseph Labre collapsed here in 1783, died in a house behind the church, and was buried in the north transept beneath an altar. An effigy of him was added by Achille Albacini in 1892. His feast is celebrated in the church on 16 April.

It has been a parish church since 1824, served by diocesan clergy, and a titular since 1960.

Inscriptions in the church record other connections with notable people. Joseph Calasanctius, founder of the Piarists, after arriving in Rome in 1592 often prayed in the new church before the image of Our Lady. At the request of Pope Benedict XIII, the church and altar were rededicated in 1728 by the pope’s almoner, Archbishop Nicola Saverio Albini, titular bishop of Leuce. Paul of the Cross, founder of the Passionists, said Mass here in the years 1745 to 1767 when in Rome. Alphonsus Liguori, founder of the Congregation of the Most Holy Redeemer, said Mass here from 25 April to 21 June 1762 as a guest of the Congregazione dei Pii Operai (Congregation of Pious Workers), who taught in the school for catechumens nearby at Via della Madonna dei Monti 39. Vincent Pallotti, founder of the Union of Catholic Apostolate in 1835, was devoted to the Madonna dei Monti and to Benedict Joseph Labre, buried in the church. Cardinal Vicenzo Pecci, later Pope Leo XIII, donated family money in 1856 to members of the Society of Saint Vincent de Paul who tended the sick poor at the church. Pope John Paul II paid a pastoral visit to the church on 8 March 1987.

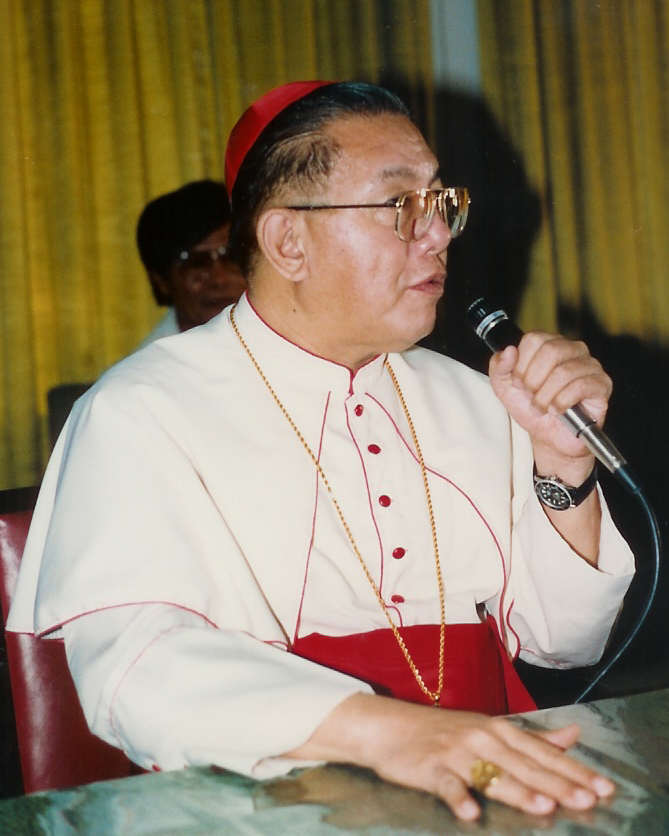
Jaime Sin, 2nd Titular Cardinal

== Titular cardinals ==
Cardinal Priests of the titulus of Santa Maria ai Monti have included:

- Rufino Jiao Santos of Manila, Philippines (31 March 1960 – 3 September 1973)
- Jaime Sin of Manila, Philippines (24 May 1976 – 21 June 2005)
- Jorge Urosa of Caracas, Venezuela (24 March 2006 – 23 September 2021)
- Jean-Marc Aveline of Marseille, France (27 August 2022 – present)
