= Santa Susanna, Rome =

Santa Susanna at the Baths of Diocletian
- Santa Susanna alle Terme di Diocleziano
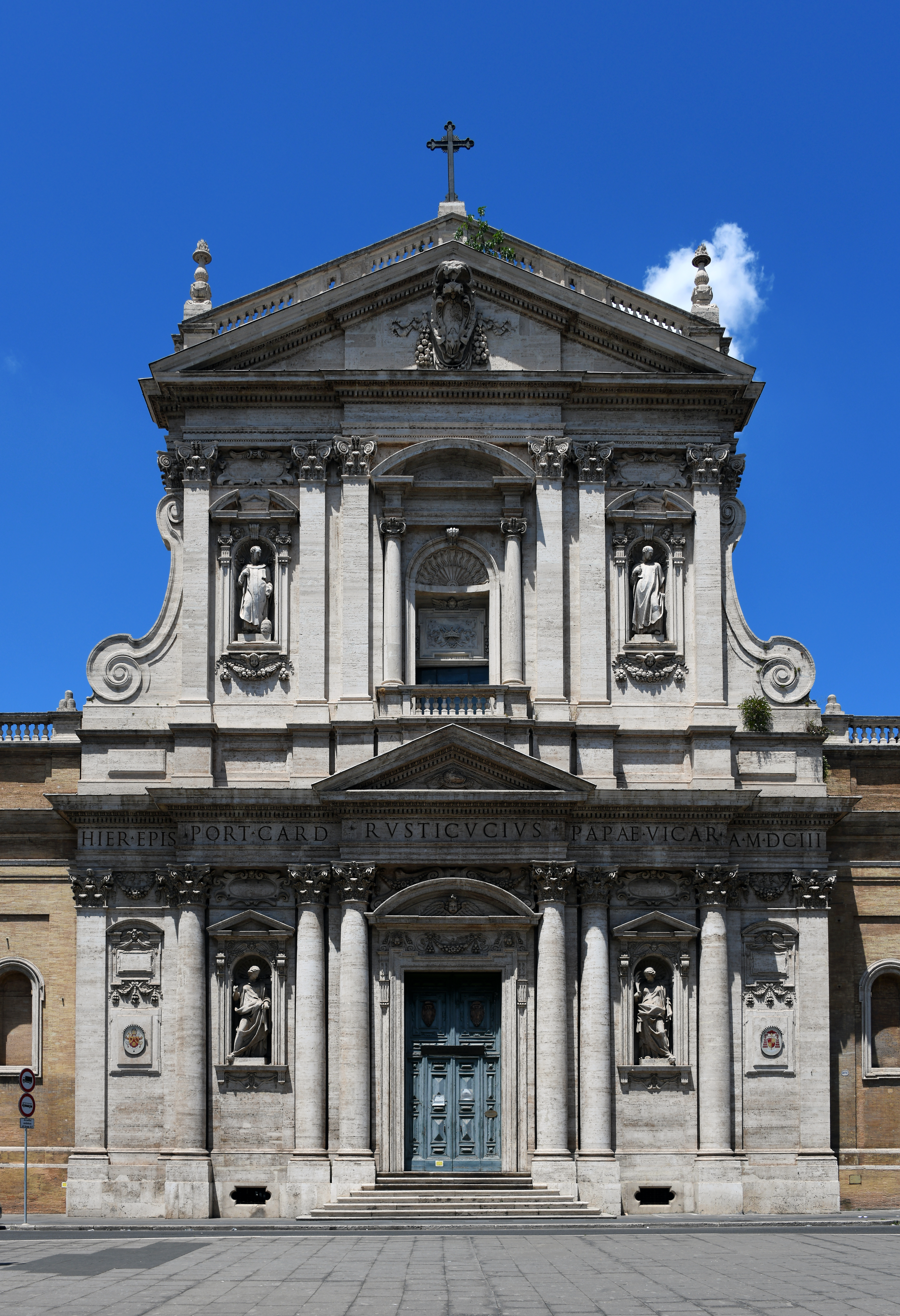
- Baroque façade of Santa Susanna by Carlo Maderno (1603).
- Click on the map for a fullscreen view.
- 41°54′15.3″N 12°29′37.1″E
- Location: 14 Via XX Settembre, Rome
- Country: Italy
- Denomination: Catholic
- Tradition: Roman Rite
- Religious order: Cistercians (nuns)

History
- Status: Titular church, parish church
- Dedication: Saint Susanna
- Consecrated: 330

Architecture
- Architect: Carlo Maderno
- Architectural type: Church
- Style: Baroque
- Groundbreaking: 4th century
- Completed: 1603

Specifications
- Length: 45 metres (148 ft)
- Width: 17 metres (56 ft)

The Church of Saint Susanna at the Baths of Diocletian (Italian: Chiesa di Santa Susanna alle Terme di Diocleziano) is a Catholic parish and Cistercian conventual church located on the Quirinal Hill in Rome, Italy. There has been a titular church associated to its site as far back as AD 280. The current church was rebuilt between 1585 and 1603 for a community of Cistercian nuns founded on the site in 1587 and still based there.

The church served as the national parish for residents of Rome from the United States from 1921 to 2017, during which period the pastoral work of the parish was assigned to the Paulist Fathers, a society of priests founded in the United States. The Paulist Fathers' ministry to United States Catholics subsequently moved to San Patrizio (Saint Patrick).

== Architectural history ==
=== Roman era ===
About AD 280, an early Christian house of worship was established on this site, which, like many of the earliest Christian meeting places, was in a house (domus ecclesiae). According to the 6th-century acta of Susanna, the domus belonged to two brothers named Caius and Gabinus, prominent Christians. Caius has been identified both with Pope Caius and with Caius the presbyter, who was a prefect and who is a source of information on early Christianity. Gabinus or Gabinius is the name given to the father of the semi-legendary Susanna of Rome. Her earliest documented attestations identify her as the patron of the church, not as a martyr, and previously the church was identified in the earliest, fourth-century documents by its title "of Gaius" by the Baths of Diocletian or as "ad duas domos" ("near the two houses"). It is mentioned in connection with a Roman synod of 499.

The Church of Santa Susanna is one of the oldest titles in the city of Rome. The early Christian church, built on the remains of three Roman villas still visible beneath the monastery, was situated immediately outside the wall of the Baths built by Diocletian and the Servian Wall, the first walls built to defend the city. According to tradition, the church was erected on Susanna's house, where she was martyred. In the 4th century it was marked with the designation ad duas domos (at the two houses). This first three-aisled basilica was almost certainly built under the pontificate of Pope Leo III (795–816).

According to tradition, the structure became a church around 330, under Emperor Constantine I, when the basilicas of numerous house churches came to be adapted for liturgical use. The basilica was T-shaped with a central nave with twelve columns on each side, flanked by side aisles. All that is left of these two side aisles, after the late 16th-century rebuilding, are the two side chapels of the basilica church. In the Synod of 565, the church is first referred to by the title of Susanna; the church has been dedicated to her veneration ever since. In the acta, Susanna is martyred with her family when the girl refuses to marry the son of Emperor Diocletian; the occasion of Susanna's martyrdom is a literary trope that is familiar in other "passions" of virgins in the Roman Martyrology

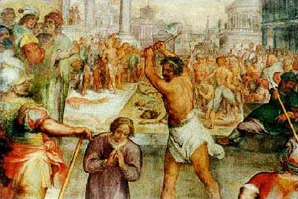
Fresco detail in Santa Susanna depicting the martyrdom of St. Felicity, by Paris Nogari.

Pope Sergius I restored it at the end of the 7th century, but Pope Leo III, the fourth pope who had been pastor of this church, rebuilt it from the ground in 796, adding the great apse and conserving the relics of the saints in the crypt. A vast mosaic of Christ flanked by Leo and the Emperor Charlemagne, and Saints Susanna and Felicity on the other side, was so badly damaged in the 12th century by an earthquake that the interior was plastered over in the complete renovation that spanned the years 1585–1602, and frescoed by Cesare Nebbia.

A façade, in travertine, remained to be constructed. The present church of Santa Susanna on its ancient foundations was the first independent commission in Rome for Carlo Maderno, who had trained as an assistant to his uncle Domenico Fontana, the chief architect of Pope Sixtus V. In 1603, Maderno completed the façade, a highly influential early Baroque design. The dynamic rhythm of columns and pilasters, crowding centrally, and the protrusion and increased central decoration add further complexity to the structure. There is an interplay of relationships, none exactly symmetric on any one mirror side. The entrance and roof are surrounded by triangular pediments. The windows are replaced by niches. There is an incipient playfulness with the rules of classic design, still maintaining rigor. The statues of the higher level (Pope Caius and Genesius of Rome) are by Giovanni Antonio Paracea, those of the lower level (Susanna and Felicitas of Rome) are by Stefano Maderno.

The church of Santa Susanna was accounted so successful that in 1605 Pope Paul V named Maderno architect of Saint Peter's Basilica, where he completed the nave and constructed the great façade.

=== Modern era ===
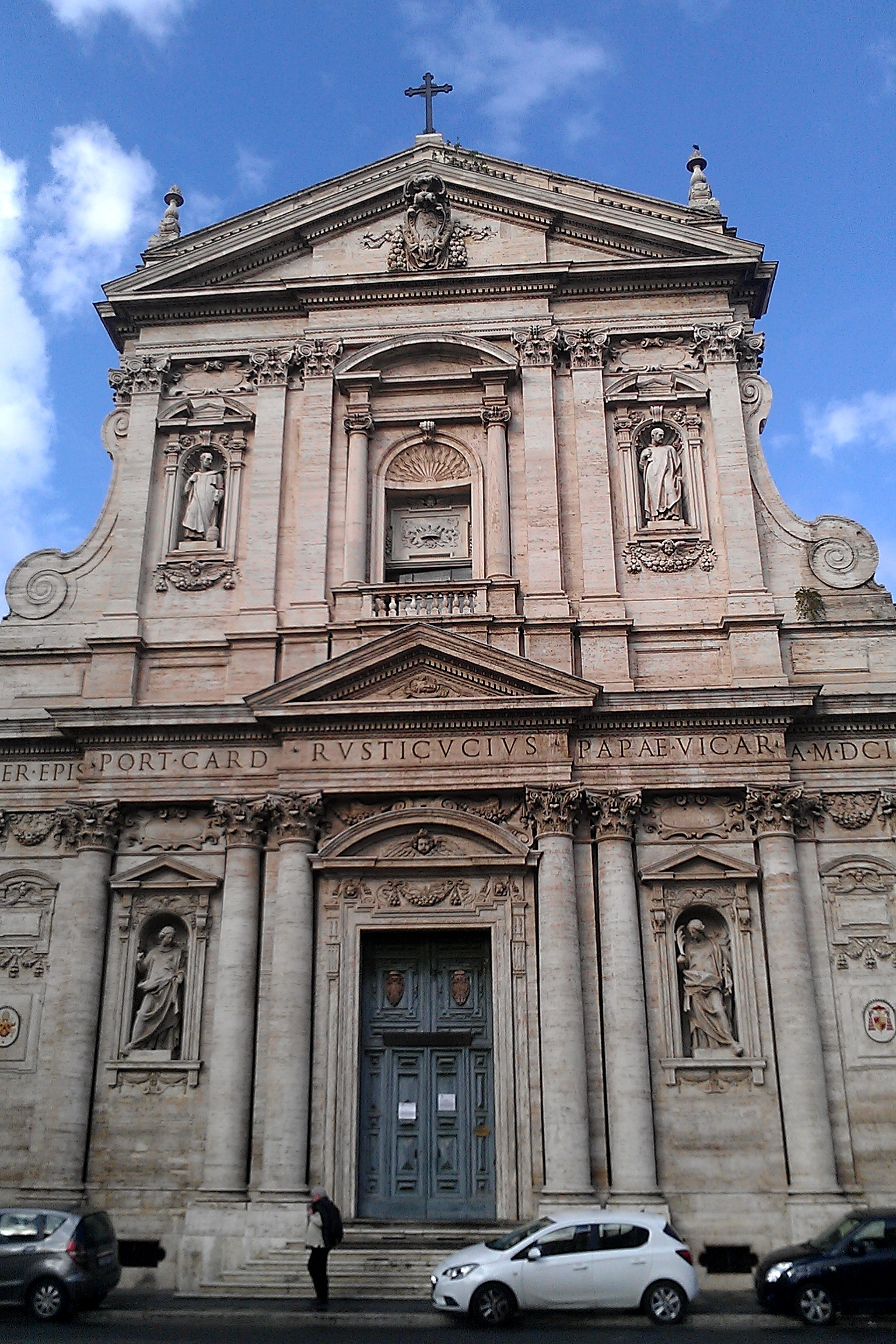
Santa Susanna, Rome

Pope Sixtus IV (1475–1477) proceeded to rebuild the church, probably a single nave with two side chapels. In 1588 it became the last great rebuilding effort of Cardinal Girolamo Rusticucci, Cardinal protector of the Cistercian Order, with construction running from 1595 to 1603. One of the objectives pursued with greater commitment from Rusticucci as the vicar general of Pope Sixtus V was to renew the life of the religious orders. A reflection of that action can be seen in a figurative program decorating the walls of the church. The main themes are: defense of chastity against corruption of morals and the victory of the true faith over any temptation to idolatry and heresy. They were joined by the exaltation of the virginal choice of Susanna and her prayerful attitude. Rusticucci wanted to highlight and connect these themes to the inseparable bond that his church had with the Cistercian nuns whose monastery occupied the site.

Rusticucci, a lover of "tradition", chose from the best of that time, which came from the fruitful artistic outpouring from the Counter-Reformation. Consequently, he gave the assignment to Carlo Maderno (1556–1629) for architectural renovations made to the church. It was he who was the designer of its travertine facade. The frescoes of the central hall (six scenes from the life of the chaste Susanna) are by Baldassare Croce of Bologna (1563–1638). To Cesare Nebbia, a native of Orvieto (1536–1614), can be attributed the frescoes in the dome and apse curve in which are reproduced some scenes from the life of Susanna.

The altarpiece of the high altar, depicting the beheading of Susanna, is by Tommaso Laureti of Palermo (1530–1602). Camilla Peretti, sister of Pope Sixtus, was a great benefactor of the Cistercian nuns, and helped build their residential quarters, including the Chapel of St Lawrence whose frescoes are the work of Giovan Battista Pozzo (1563–1591). The painting of the altar depicting the martyrdom of the holy deacon is also by Nebbia. Large statues of the major prophets and two of Peter and Paul are attributed to Giovanni Antonio Paracea, called Valsoldo. Through the glass floor of the sacristy can be seen part of the early Christian Church and the remains of the Roman house, which is said to be the home of the father of Susanna. A Roman sarcophagus with fragments of painted plaster was discovered in modern times. The excavations also unearthed a tympanum depicting the Lamb of God on a blue background and flanked by John the Baptist and John the Evangelist; a Madonna and child between Agatha and Susanna; plus five beautiful busts of other saints.

Behind the chancel, separated by an iron grating, is located the splendid monastic choir, a large rectangular room. It was built in 1596 by Rusticucci, as attested by the coat of arms in the center of the choir's rich, carved wooden-coffered floor. The choir stalls were donated by Pope Sixtus and are repeatedly mentioned in the old guides as one of the finest choirs existent in Roman monasteries. The walls are adorned with frescoes depicting saints and scenes from the Old Testament. The artist who created these paintings was Francesco Di (1676–1702). Also in the choir, in the four branches of the two niches that preserve the reliquaries, appear Benedict of Nurcia and Scholastica (left) and Bernard of Clairvaux and Susanna (on the right), all by the Umbrian painter Avanzino Nucci (1599). In 1719, Filippo Fregiotti painted the frescoes in a chapel inside the enclosure.

St. Susanna Church in Dedham, Massachusetts was named by Cardinal Richard Cushing for Santa Susanna.

== Interior ==
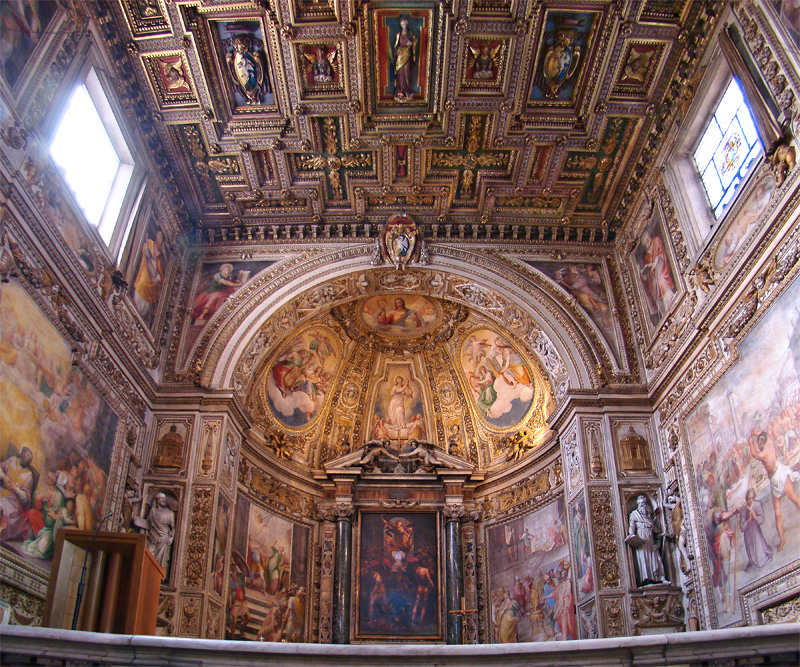
The interior.

The church consists of a single nave, with a circular apse forming two side-chapels. The frescoes of the central nave by Baldassare Croce represent six scenes from the life of Susanna found in the Book of Daniel. The frescoes on the curved side of the apse show Susanna being threatened by Maximian, but defended by the angel of God, and to the right, Susanna refusing to worship the idol Jupiter. Nebbia's frescoes on the dome of the apse depict Susanna flanked on either side by angels with musical instruments. Behind the high altar, the painting depicting the beheading of Susanna is by Tommaso Laureti.

=== Chapel of our Lady of Graces ===
The chapel of our Lady of Graces (whose painting was formerly on the altar) has on its walls two recent frescoes of Benedict of Nursia and Bernard of Clairvaux.

=== Chapel of Saint Lawrence ===
Domenico Fontana constructed the second side-chapel to the left, dedicated to Saint Lawrence and commissioned by Camilla Peretti, sister of Pope Sixtus V. The paintings are by the Milanese artist Giovanni Battista Pozzo (1563–1591). The altar painting by Cesare Nebbia depicts the martyrdom of St. Lawrence. In this chapel are venerated Genesius of Rome, patron of actors, in the act of receiving baptism, and the bishop Pope Eleuterus.

=== Presbytery ===
The presbytery is decorated with two frescoes. To the left, Baldassare Croce depicts the martyrdom of Gabinus, while to the right, Paris Nogari shows the martyrdom of Felicitas of Rome and her seven sons.

=== Ceiling ===
The valuable ceiling of the nave and of the presbytery is made in polychromed gilt wood, carved to the design of Carlo Maderno.

== Religious associations ==
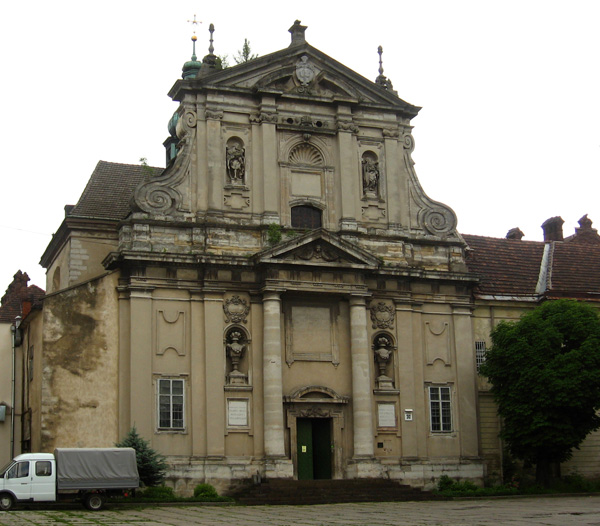
A 17th-century replica of Santa Susanna in Lviv, Ukraine.

- Entombed in the church are five early church martyrs and saints: Susanna, her father Gabinus, Felicitas of Rome, Pope Eleuterus, and Genesius of Rome.
- The commemoration of Saint Susanna has long been linked in the Roman calendar with Saint Tiburtius, 11 August.
- Among the previous cardinal priests of Santa Susanna was Pope Nicholas V (1446).
- It is the namesake of St. Susanna Church, a parish in Dedham, Massachusetts.

=== American national church ===
After World War I, the Paulist Fathers, founded in New York City in 1858, had grown to such an extent that they felt the time had come to seek approval of their religious institute from the Holy See, in order to be able to work throughout the worldwide Catholic Church. They also wanted to establish a procurator general there to coordinate their work with the Vatican. To this end, the Superior General of the Society, Thomas Burke, went to Rome in January 1921 to meet with Pope Benedict XV for this. During this trip, they first noticed Santa Susanna, as it was adjacent to the American Embassy to Italy at the time. Its location made it of interest to the Americans.

The Paulists opened the office of the Procurator General in the city that following spring, headed by Thomas Lantry O'Neill. In the meantime, Burke's brother, also a member of the Society, had approached President Warren Harding to make him aware of their interest in making use of the church to serve the growing American population of Rome. Harding made a request for this to the Apostolic Delegate to the United States, Archbishop Giovanni Bonzano, during the course of a meeting in June. Bonzano transmitted the request to the Vatican Secretary of State, with the recommendation that it be granted as a gesture of good will to the United States.

In December 1921, Pope Benedict XV authorized the Paulist Fathers to administer Santa Susanna as the national church in Rome for the American residents of Rome and visitors from the United States of America. The abbess of the monastery gave the keys to the church to the new pastor on 1 January 1922. Cardinal William Henry O'Connell of Boston presided at the first public Mass for the American community of the city on 26 February 1922.

The cardinal who held the title to the church had died during the summer of 1921, leaving the church with no legal owner under Italian law. At the same time, electrical lights were installed in the church, to which Americans were accustomed but Roman people found shocking. The Ambassador of Romania also claimed the church as a national church for the people of his country. The ownership issue settled at the end of 1924, when Bonzano, the former Apostolic Nuncio and by then a cardinal himself, requested a transfer of his title to this church. Once that was accomplished, he appointed O'Neill as the rector of the parish.

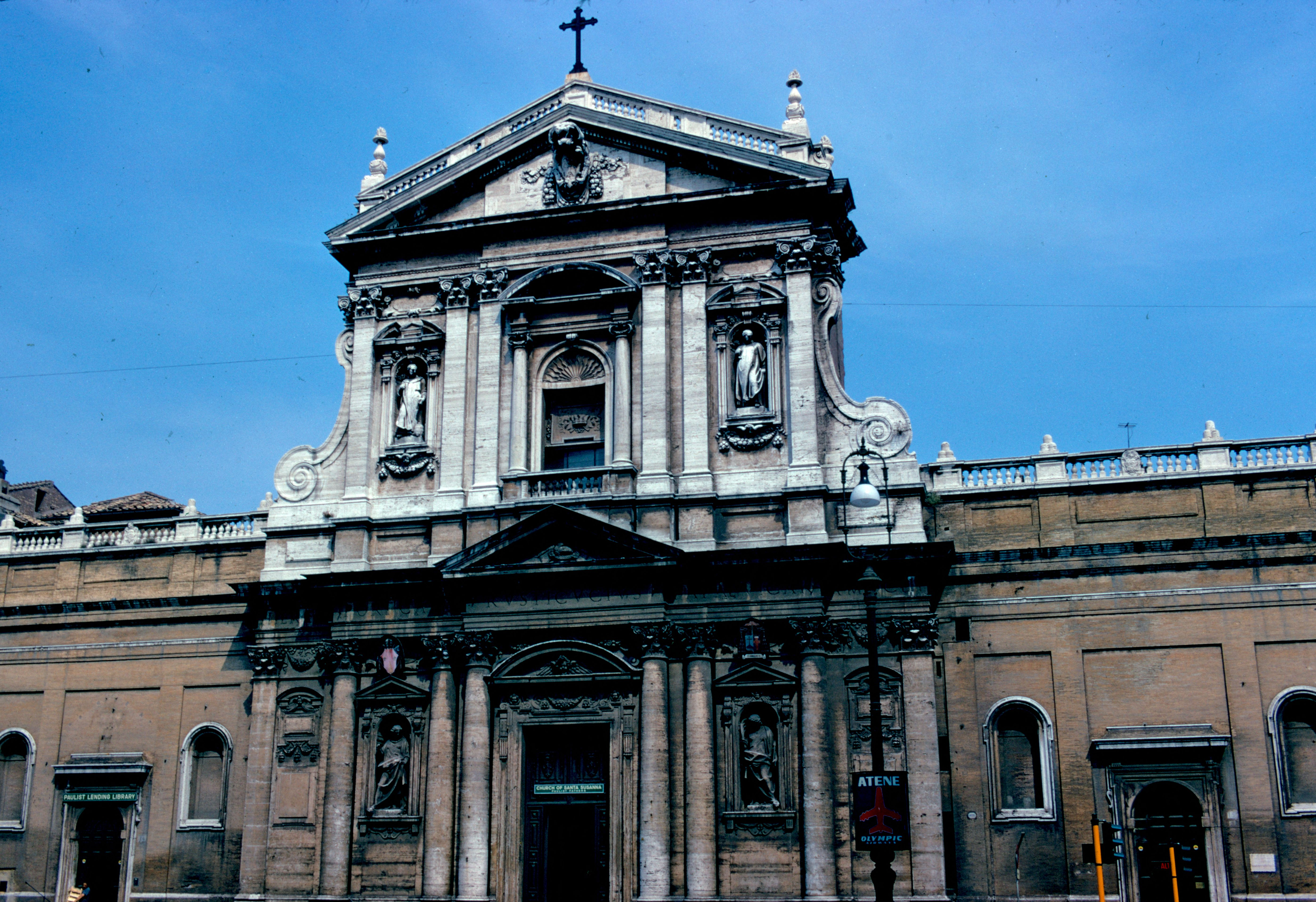
The Santa Susanna in 1972

From 1958 to 1985, the cardinal assigned to Santa Susanna as his titular church has been the Archbishop of Boston. Bernard Francis Law remained the titular cardinal until his December 2017 death, though he resigned as archbishop in 2002 in the wake of the sexual abuse scandal in his archdiocese.

Since August 2017, following a campaign by the Cistercian nuns who had maintained a presence at Santa Susanna since 1587, the American expatriate community relocated its national church to San Patrizio.

== Cardinal Priests of Santa Susanna since 494 ==
List of the cardinal titulars of the church

- Asello (494–?)
- Rusticus (590–?)
- Conone (Pope Conon) (683?–686)
- Sergius (Pope Sergius I) (683?–687)
- Johanes (745 – before 761)
- Leontius (761 – before 796)
- Leo (Pope Leo III) (795)
- Johannes (964 – before 1012)
- Johannes (before 1012 – before 1033)
- Johannes (1033 – before 1062)
- Petrus (1062 – before 1099)
- Pietro Gheradesca di Donoratico (1099–1106)
- Gezo (1106 – c. 1112)
- Pietro Gherardeschi (1117–1130); pseudocardinal of Antipope Anacletus II
- Stanzio (1130–1133)
- Giordano Bobone Orsini (1145–1165)
- Ermanno, called il Maestro (1165 or 1166 – c. 1170)
- Lesbio Grassi (1170–1173)
- Pietro de Bono (1173–1187)
- Alessio (1188–1189)
- Giovani Felice (1190–1194)
- Bendetto (1201–1212)
- Aldobrandino Gaetani (or Ildebrando) (1219–1221)
- Geoffroy Barbeau (or de Barro) (1281–1287)
- Benedetto Caetani (1288–1294)
- Pierre d'Arrabloy (1316–1328)
- Andrea Ghini Malpighi (Andrea Ghilini) (1342–1343)
- Pierre Bertrand (or du Colombier) (1344–1361)
- Filippo Ruffini (or Gezza) (1378–1386)
- Francesco Carbone Tomacelli (1384–1392)
- Pierre de Thury (1385–1410)
- Antonio II Panciera (6 June 1411 – 3 July 1431)
- Guillaume-Hugues d'Estaing (1431–1446)
- Tommaso Parentucelli di Sanzana (Pope Nicholas V) (1446–1447)
- Filippo Calandrini (1448–1451)
- Alessandro Oliva di Sassoferrato (19 March 1460 – 20 August 1463)
- Jean Balue (13 May 1468 – 31 January 1483)
- Lorenzo Cibo de’ Mari (23 March 1489 – 14 March 1491)
- Juan de Borja Lanzol de Romaní, el mayor (31 August 1492 – 1 August 1503)
- Francesco Soderini (12 June 1503 – 15 September 1508)
- Leonardo Grosso della Rovere (15 September 1508 – 9 March 1517)
- Raffaello Petrucci (26 December 1517 – 11 December 1522)
- Antonio Sanseverino (27 April 1528 – 16 May 1530)
- Juan García de Loaysa y Mendoza (16 May 1530 – 22 April 1546)
- Georges II d'Amboise (7 September 1546 – 28 February 1550)
- Jacques d'Annebaut (22 March 1548 – 6 June 1557)
- Girolamo Seripando (10 March 1561 – 17 March 1563)
- Francisco Pacheco de Toledo (14 July 1564 – 7 February 1565)
- Bernardo Navagero (6 February 1565 – 13 April 1565)
- Francesco Alciati (3 June 1565 – 13 May 1569)
- Girolamo Rusticucci (9 June 1570 – 18 August 1597 or 1603)
- Anne d’Escars de Givry (de Pérusse), O.S.B. (14 June 1604 – 19 April 1612)
- Gaspar Borja y Velasco (10 December 1612 – 17 October 1616)
- Scipione Cobelluzzi (17 October 1616 – 29 June 1626)
- Giulio Cesare Sacchetti (2 December 1626 – 29 April 1652)
- Giovanni Battista Spada (23 March 1654 – 27 January 1659)
- Francesco Sforza Pallavicino (1659–1660)
- Carlo Carafa della Spina (13 April 1665 – 27 May 1675)
- Bernhard Gustave von Baden-Durlach (19 October 1676 – 26 December 1677)
- Marc Antonio Barbarigo (30 September 1686 – 1 July 1697)
- Daniello Marco Delfino (30 March 1700 – 5 August 1704)
- Lorenzo Corsini (Pope Clement XII) (25 June 1706 – 16 December 1720)
- José Pereira de Lacerda (16 June 1721 – 28 September 1738)
- Raniero Felice Simonetti (15 May 1747 – 20 August 1749)
- Luca Melchiore Tempi (24 May 1756 – 23 May 1757)
- Ludovico Valenti (19 November 1759 – 20 December 1762)
- Carlo Crivelli (24 May 1802 – 19 January 1818)
- Giuseppe della Porta Rodiani (24 July 1835 – 18 December 1841)
- Ignazio Giovanni Cadolini (30 January 1843 – 11 April 1850)
- Alessandro Barnabò (19 June 1856 – 24 February 1874)
- Bartolomeo D’Avanzo (7 April 1876 – 20 October 1884)
- Francis Patrick Moran (30 July 1885 – 16 August 1911)
- François-Virgile Dubillard (30 November 1911 – 1 December 1914)
- Giorgio Gusmini (9 December 1915 – 24 August 1921)
- Giovanni Bonzano (18 December 1924 – 26 November 1927)
- Alexis Lépicier (22 December 1927 – 20 May 1936)
- Arthur Hinsley (16 December 1937 – 17 March 1943)
- Edward Mooney (22 February 1946 – 25 October 1958)
- Richard Cushing (18 December 1958 – 2 November 1970)
- Humberto Sousa Medeiros (5 March 1973 – 17 September 1983)
- Bernard Francis Law (25 May 1985 – 20 December 2017)

== See also ==
- National churches in Rome
- Paulist Fathers
