= Saints Tiburtius and Susanna =

Saints Tiburtius and Susanna are two Catholic saints that are otherwise unrelated but venerated on the same day:

- Saint Susanna (fl. 3rd century), a Christian martyr of the Diocletianic persecution
- Saint Tiburtius (died c. 286), a Christian martyr
