= Matteo Zaccolini =

Italian painter

- The frescoes on the vault of San Silvestro al Quirinale, realized by Zaccolini in collaboration with Giuseppe Agellio and Cristoforo Roncalli
- Born: 12 April 1574; Cesena, Papal States
- Died: 13 July 1630 (aged 56); Rome, Papal States
- Known for: Painting; Studies on perspective
- Movement: Mannerism; Baroque
- Patrons: Vincenzo Giustiniani

Matteo Zaccolini (also called Zacolini and Zocolino; 12 April 1574 – 13 July 1630) was an Italian painter, priest and author of the late Mannerist and early Baroque periods. He was a mathematical theorist on perspective.

== Life and works ==
Born in Cesena, he was a pupil of the local painter Francesco Masini. After studying optics and perspective in his hometown with the noted mathematician Scipione Chiaramonti, a pupil of Guidobaldo del Monte, in 1599 he established himself in Rome, where he became a specialist in illusionistic painting. He became a protégé of Vincenzo Giustiniani, an influential art collector and intellectual renowned for his patronage of painters, including Caravaggio, Nicolas Poussin and Domenichino.

Zaccolini collaborated with Baldassare Croce with the quadratura frescoes in the church of Santa Susanna, where he painted the trompe-l'œil columns. In collaboration with Giuseppe Agellio and Cristoforo Roncalli, he frescoed the Theatine house of San Silvestro al Monte Cavallo, now San Silvestro al Quirinale in Rome. In 1603, upon completion of the decoration of the choir at San Silvestro, Zaccolini was apprenticed as a Theatine lay brother at that church. Two years later he took his monastic vows. From then on, he worked solely in Theatine projects, in Naples and Rome. He travelled to Naples for the first time in 1609–10 to work at the Theatine church of Santi Apostoli. His work for Santa Maria degli Angeli a Pizzofalcone also dates from this period. After returning to Rome, the chapter of Santi Apostoli requested his return to Naples on 18 August 1617 to decorate the new sacristy. Zaccolini left Naples on 27 April 1623, arriving in Rome on 2 May. He spent three months at the Theatine house of Sant'Andrea della Valle, probably assisting Domenichino on the planning and execution of the fresco decorations for the adjacent church. After this brief period, in August 1623, he was assigned to San Silvestro, where he died on 13 July 1630, possibly from a chronic illness he had contracted in Naples.

Zaccolini is best known for a four-volume treatise on perspective (1618–22), of which the only surviving copy is in Florence (Bib. Medicea–Laurenziana, MS. Ash. 1212): De colori treats the theory of color; Prospettiva del colore discusses practice, emphasizing the use of hue and value gradients to create the illusion of depth; Prospettiva lineale presents perspective projection and measurement; and Della descrittione dell’ombre prodotte da corpi opachi rettilinei explains the projection of cast shadows. Zaccolini's ambition to write such a long and complex treatise on optics and perspective was strongly supported by his order. He probably intended to publish his volumes with the order's publisher at Sant'Agostino in Naples, but the project remained ultimately unrealized. While not in general circulation, Zaccolini's treatise nevertheless gained him renown among eclectic circles in Rome. In 1666, the historian and fellow Theatine Giuseppe Silos described Zaccolini as one of the "Geniuses of our order and most admirable men of his age". Bellori described him as a master of perspective and optics, and as having instructed Domenichino, Gagliardi, Circignani, and Cavaliere d’Arpino among others. Cassiano dal Pozzo disseminated his ideas in Rome, and Nicolas Poussin took a copy of his treatise to France.

Zaccolini was a fervent admirer of Leonardo da Vinci. According to his early biographer Cassiano dal Pozzo, the earliest version of the manuscript was written in mirror-script which, like the manuscript's content, revealed the influence of the writings of Leonardo. Zaccolini's emphasis on the importance of scientific knowledge in the imitation of nature encouraged the development of a rationalist approach associated with classicism in 17th-century art.
