= Giuseppe Agellio =

Italian painter

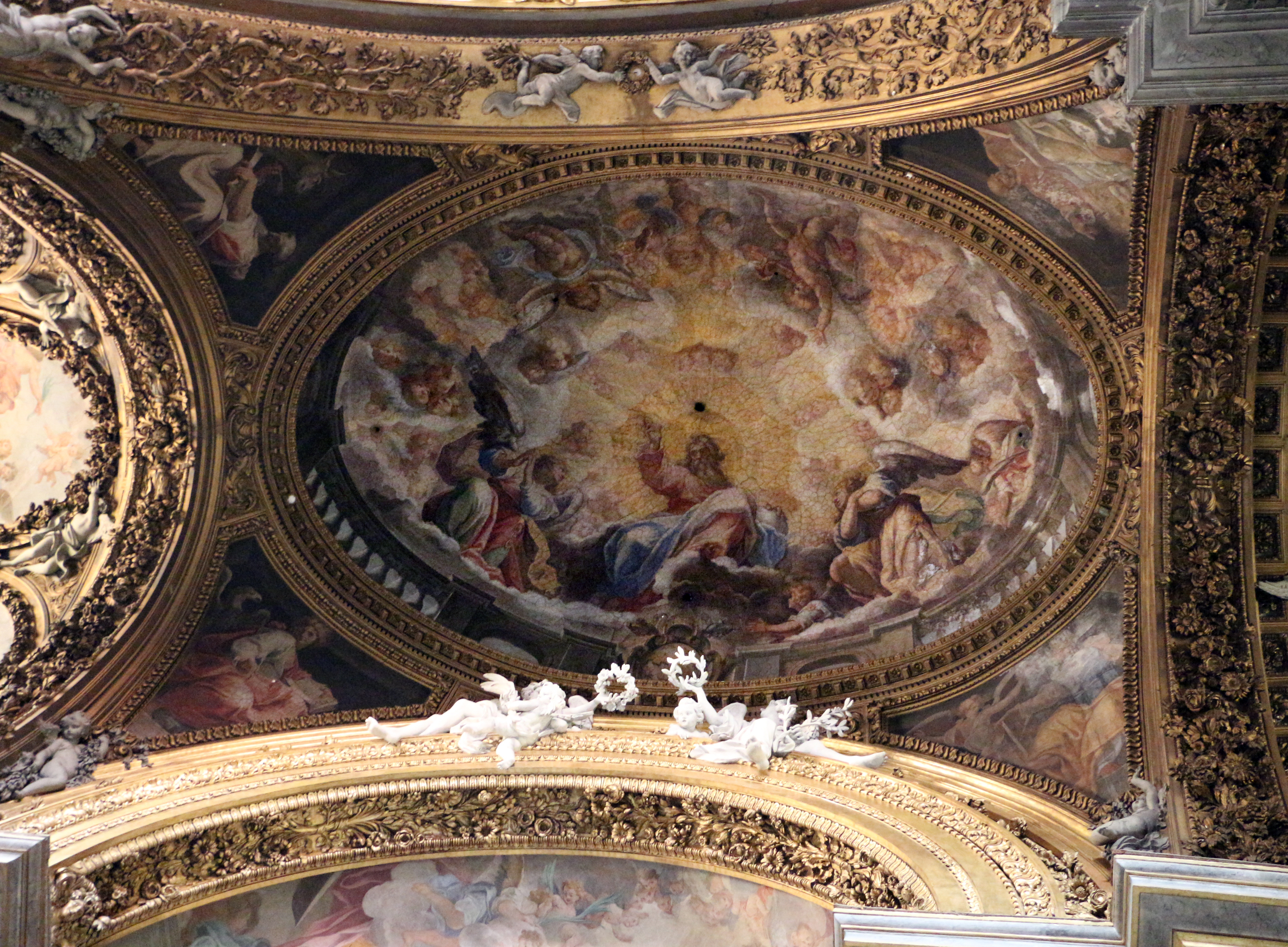
Cristoforo Roncalli and assistants Giuseppe Agellio and Cristoforo Casolani. Frescoes on the vault of San Silvestro in Capite, before 1605.

Giuseppe Agellio (1570 – after 1620) was an Italian painter of the Baroque period. Born in Sorrento, he was a pupil of the painter Cristoforo Roncalli and worked in Rome. He excelled in painting landscape and architecture.

His works include decorations in the choir of the Theatine church of San Silvestro al Quirinale in Rome, for which the contract, dated 1602 and signed by Agellio and his collaborator Matteo Zaccolini, survives.

== Sources ==
- Ticozzi, Stefano (1830). Dizionario degli architetti, scultori, pittori, intagliatori in rame ed in pietra, coniatori di medaglie, musaicisti, niellatori, intarsiatori d'ogni etá e d'ogni nazione' (Volume 1). Milan: Gaetano Schiepatti. p. 24.
