= Oratorio del Gonfalone, Rome =

Historic building in central Rome

Coordinates: 41°53′51″N 12°27′59″E

The Oratorio del Gonfalone or Oratory of the Banner is a building in Central Rome which once housed a Catholic fraternity. Since about 1960 it has served as a concert venue for the Roman Polyphonic Choir.

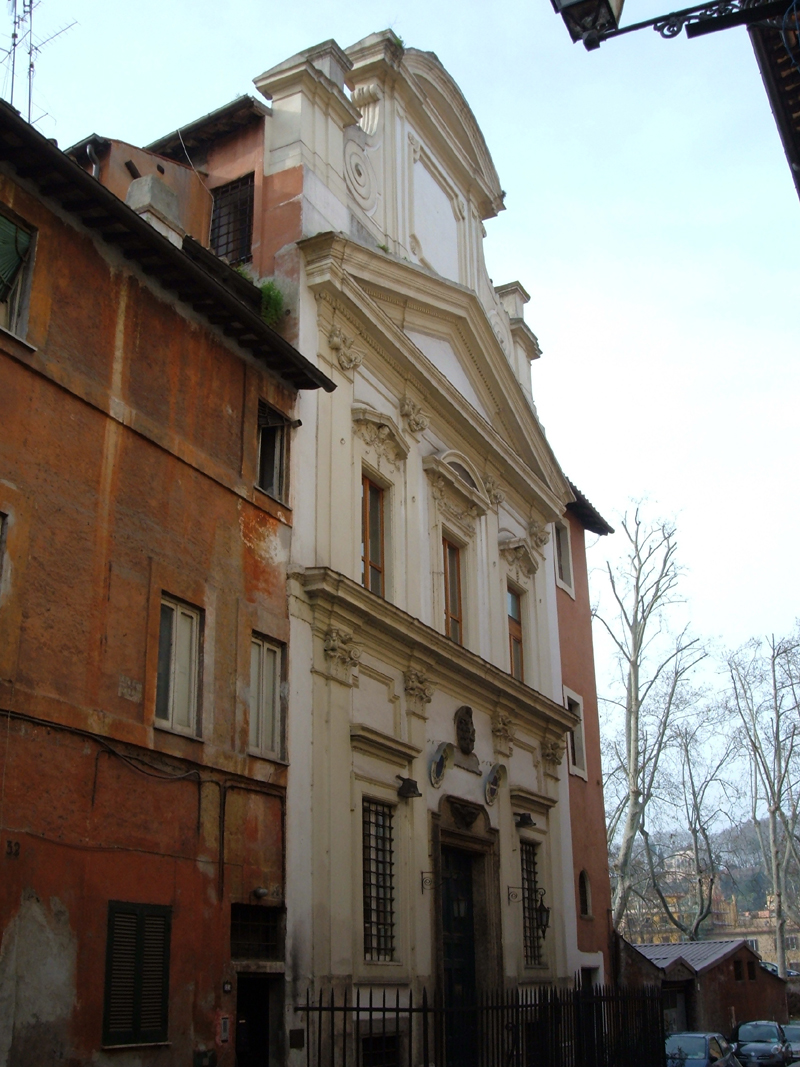
Oratorio del Gonfalone

== History ==
The Confraternity of the Gonfalone was a group of white penitents (due to the colour of their robe). The association was first established in 1264 the church of Santa Maria in Aracoeli, under the name of the Accomandati di Madonna Santa Maria. It came to be called the Gonfalone Confraternity because of the banner carried in processions.

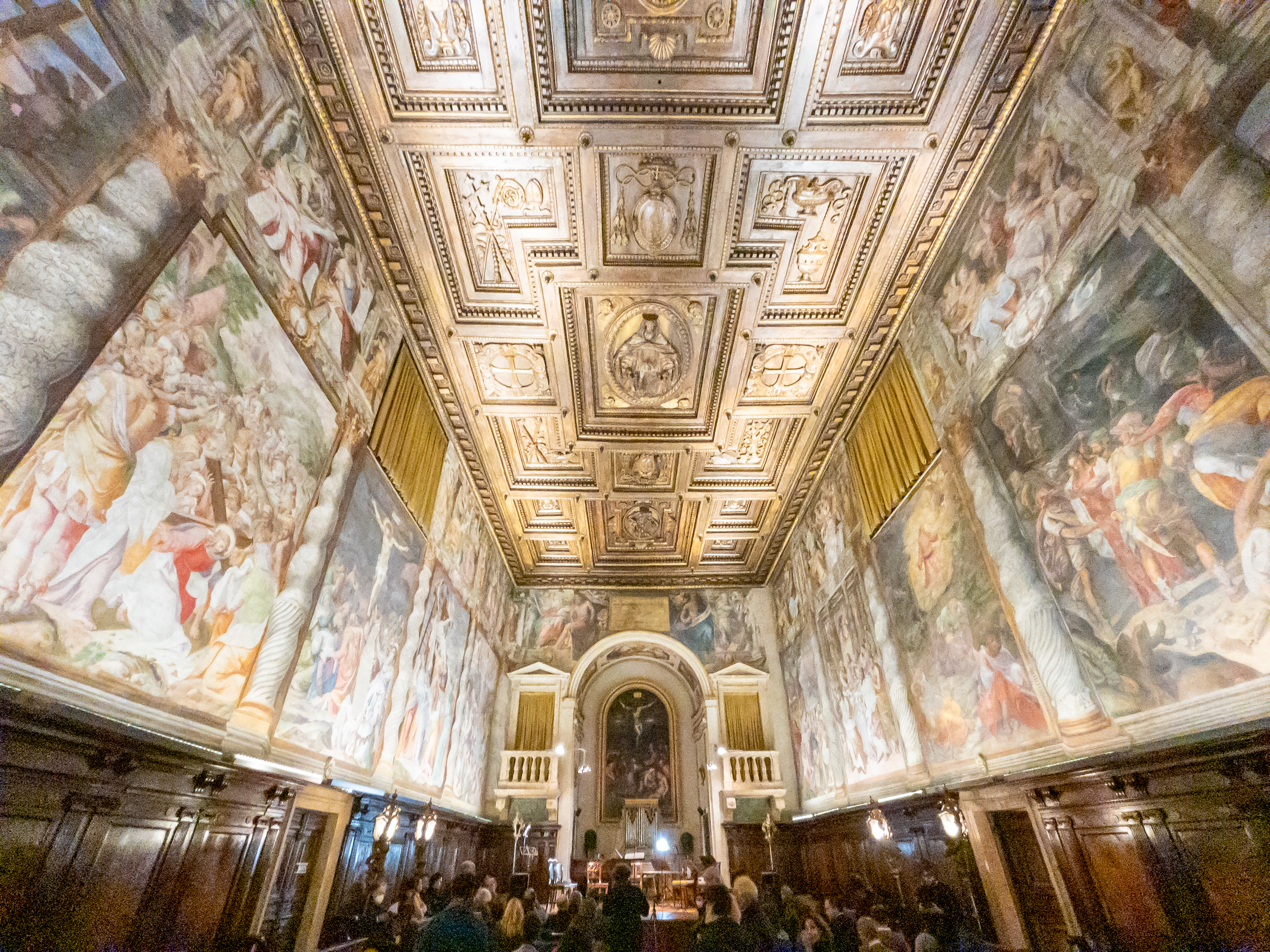
The interior

Over the centuries the group dedicated itself to various activities, including the participation in religious processions as banner carriers (wearing white gowns with peaked blue hoods), and also of putting on a yearly passion play. They also were involved in charity towards the poor and needy, and during 1581–1765, of freeing Italians enslaved in Muslim and Slavic lands.

Pope Martin V assigned to the confraternity, the old Church of Santa Lucia Vecchia, which had served as a hospice for pilgrims. A fair called "La Sposa", was held in the area annually on the Feast of St. Lucy. In 1486, Pope Innocent VIII, united a number of confraternities under the name " Confraternita del Gonfalone". As the church was close to the Tiber and subject to flooding, he transferred the confraternity to Santa Lucia ai Banchi Vecchi.

The Oratorio was built between 1544 and 1547, by the Confraternity on the ruins of the Church of Santa Lucia Vecchia which can still be seen in the basement. In 1579 Pope Gregory XIII raised it to the rank of an archconfraternity.

In 1890, the Archconfraternity was dissolved and its property devolved to the state. In October 1960 the Oratory, restored by the Superintendency of the Galleries and the works of art of Rome, was entrusted to the Roman Polyphonic Choir. It now serves as a concert venue.

== Description ==
The building on Via del Gonfalone 32a (near corner of Via Giulia and Vicolo della Scimmia) has a modest façade, designed by Domenico Castelli, resembling a simple church.

Inside, a team of prominent Mannerist painters were recruited between 1569–1576 to complete elaborate wall fresco decoration of scenes of the passion. Artists included Giacomo Zanguidi (il Bertoia) (Entry of Christ to Jerusalem); Livio Agresti (Last Supper); Marco Pino (Crown of Thorns); Federico Zuccari (Flagellation of Christ); Raffaellino Motta da Reggio (Christ before Pontius Pilate and Prophet and Sibyls); and Cesare Nebbia (Crown of Thorns and Ecce Homo). The main altarpiece is painted by Roviale Spagnolo. The site has been called the Sistine chapel of Mannerism. The Passion panels are flanked by quadratura spiral columns and surmounted by images of prophets and sybils. The Oratory bears the arms of Alessandro Farnese, Cardinal-protector. Cardinal Odoardo Farnese was also involved with the Oratorio.

Note there are at least two other Oratorio del Gonfalone in Italy, also highly decorated in the interior, one at Fabriano and the other at Vicenza.
