= College of the Neophytes =

Roman Catholic college in Rome

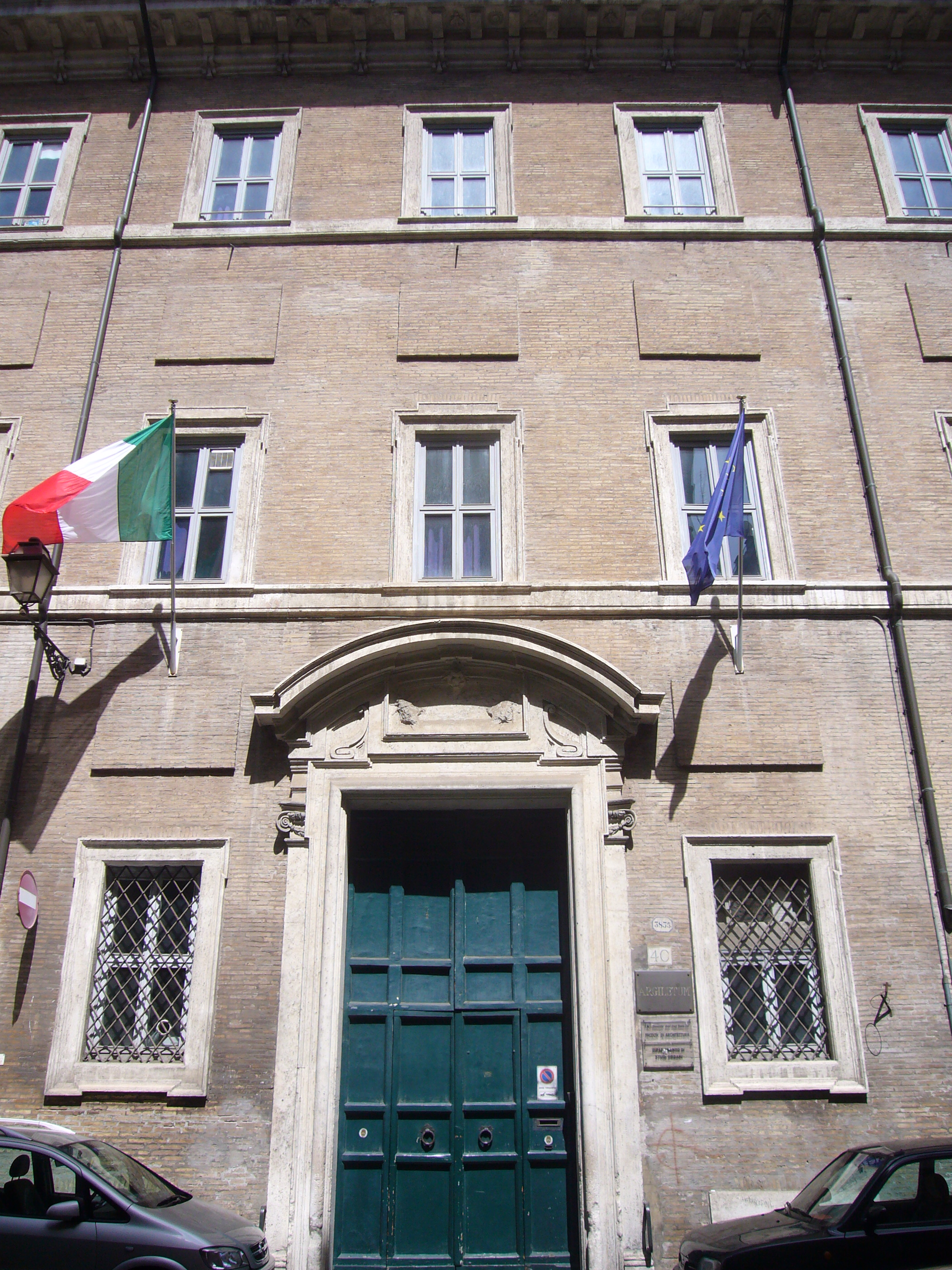
The facade of the Palazzo dei Neofiti.

The College of the Neophytes, in Italian Collegio dei Neofiti (Latin: Collegium Ecclesiasticum Adolescentium Neophytorum or Pia Domus Neophytorum) was a Roman Catholic college in Rome founded in 1577 by Gregory XIII for education of young men, in an institution for converts from Judaism and Islam that itself been started in 1543 by Pope Paul III. Neophyte in this context generally means converts from Judaism, and neofito was often appended to Italian surnames to indicate a convert. From 1634 the College was adjacent to the church of Santa Maria ai Monti.

The first head of the Collegio dei Neofiti was Giulio Antonio Santoro (1532–1602), a powerful and authoritative supporter of Gregory XIII, and judge of the Holy Inquisition. The purpose of the Collegio, in the plan of the Inquisition, was to train the neofiti, or "new Christians," to convert their fellows.

== The Palazzo dei Neofiti ==
From 1634 the College had a permanent home "at the Madonna de Monti," where cardinal Antonio Barberini, brother of Urban VIII, had constructed a new building, the Palazzo dei Neofiti, for the college. Barberini also had the last catechumens from S. Giovanni transferred to the new institution. Notable teachers at the college during this period included Giulio Bartolocci (1613–1687) a Cistercian Hebraist, and author of the Bibliotheca Magna Rabbinica or "Great Rabbinical Library."

From 1713 the Collegio was allocated away from its original purpose of training missionaries to become a charitable institution, under the Pii Operai, or "Holy Workers." It is from this period that the title Pia "Holy" is appended, though the title Pia was not always formally attached, and Papal bullae record subventions to the "poor of the House of the Neophytes." Like many charitable institutions music played a part in the education and life of the school but only two Latin graduation cantatas survive from the 17th Century.

The college closed in 1886, and is now mainly remembered for having given its name to Targum Neofiti, when that manuscript passed to the Vatican Library. The Palazzo can be viewed from the air on various tourist websites and it is currently occupied by offices of the Roma Tre University.
