= Durante Alberti =

Italian painter (c. 1556–1623)

Durante Alberti (c. 1556 – 1623) was an Italian painter of the late-Renaissance period.

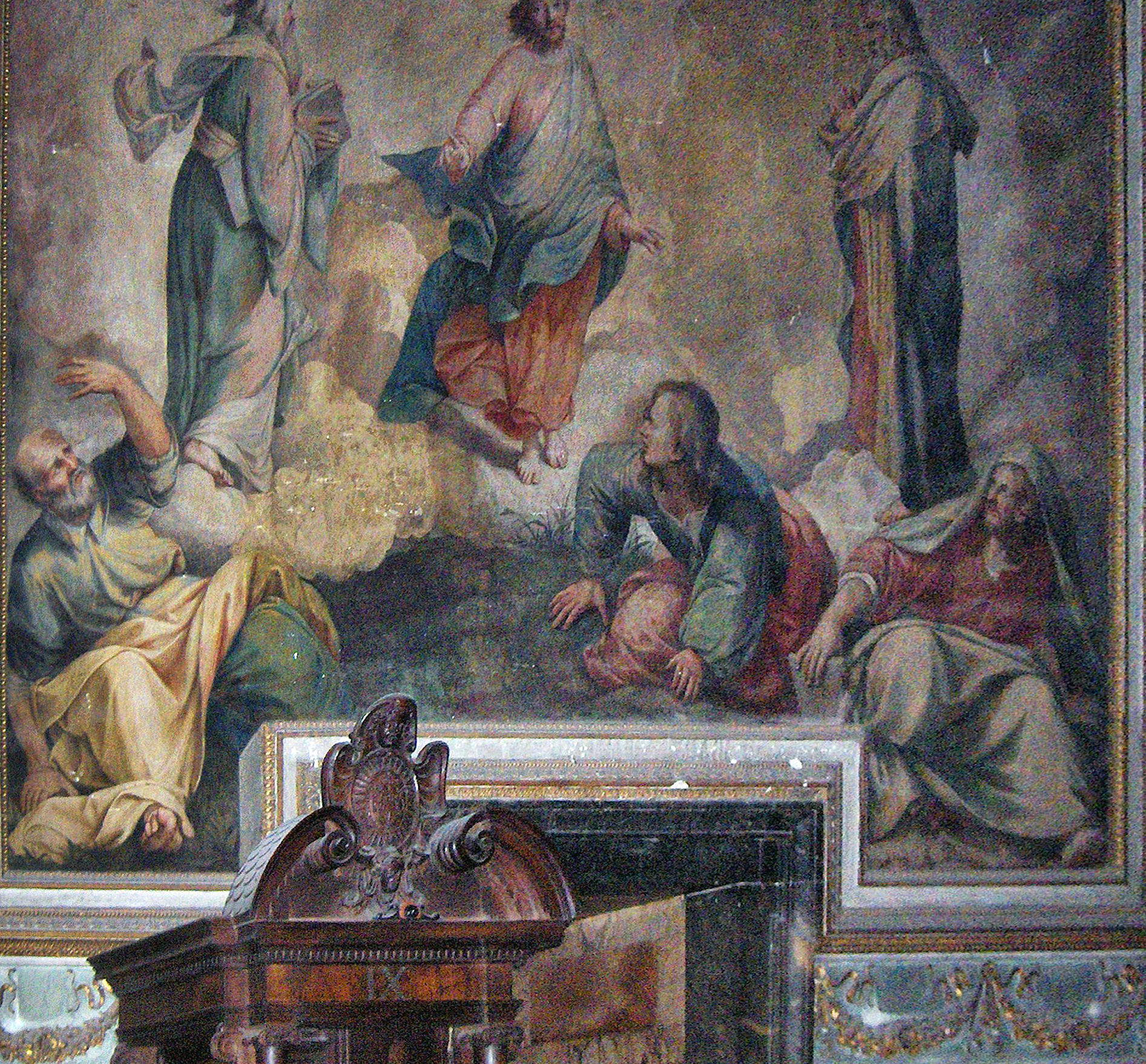
The Transfiguration, in the church Il Gesù, Rome.

He was born in Borgo San Sepolcro. He was active mainly in his native town and Rome, where he arrived during the papacy of Gregory XIII. He was also called Durante del Nero. His father was Romano Alberti. His son Pierfrancesco was also a painter and engraver. His brother, Cosimo, was a sculptor, engraver, and painter who died in Rome in 1580. His daughter Chiara was a painter. He was related to the sculptor Alberto, and the painters Alessandro, Giovanni, and Cherubino Alberti. He is said to have collaborated with Leonardo Cugni, also from San Sepolcro.

He painted for the church of San Girolamo della Carità, one of the chapels in fresco and an altar-piece in oil, representing the Virgin and child with Saints Bartolomeo and Alessandro. For Santa Maria dei Monti, he painted an Annunciation. He also painted the 'Martyr's Painting' in the Main Chapel of the Venerable English College in Rome. The painting represents the Blessed Trinity and St Thomas to whom the church was dedicated. Students would gather to sing the hymn of thsnksgiving, the Te Deum, whenever news arrived of yet another of the alumni having been executed for professing the Catholic Faith in Protestant England in the late 16th century. Forty four of these students have been declared by the Catholic Church Saints and Martyrs.

Durante Alberti was buried at Santa Maria del Popolo.

== Sources ==
- Hobbes, James R. (1849). Picture collector's manual adapted to the professional man, and the amateur. London: T&W Boone. p. 4.
- Ticozzi, Stefano (1830). Dizionario degli architetti, scultori, pittori, intagliatori in rame ed in pietra, coniatori di medaglie, musaicisti, niellatori, intarsiatori d'ogni etá e d'ogni nazione' (Volume 1). Milan: Gaetano Schiepatti. p. 24.
- Getty ULAN entry.
- Baglione, Giovanni (1733) [1641]. Le Vite de' Pittori, Scultori, Architetti, ed Intagliatori dal Pontificato di Gregorio XII del 1572. fino a' tempi de Papa Urbano VIII. nel 1642 [Lives of the painters, sculptors, architects, and engravers during the papacies of Gregory XII in 1572 to Urban VIII in 1642]. Naples: Giovanni Battista Passari. p. 111.
- Bryan, Michael (1886). Robert Edmund Graves (ed.). Dictionary of Painters and Engravers, Biographical and Critical. Vol. I A-K. London: George Bell and Sons. pp. 13–14.
