= Salvatore Fontana =

Italian painter

Salvatore Fontana (Venice, c. 1550s - 1590) was an Italian painter of the Renaissance period, a minor pupil of Cesare Nebbia active mainly in Rome.

== Biography ==
He worked under Nebbia in the Sistine Chapel in Santa Maria Maggiore, Rome in Rome.
