= Mark and Marcellian =

Roman martyrs venerated as saints

Saints Mark and Marcellian
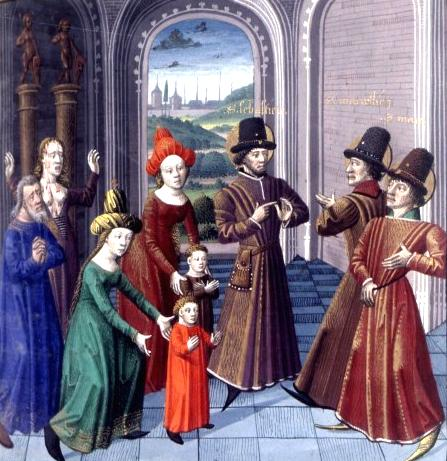
- Sts Marcus and Marcellianus (to the right) with Saint Sebastian. From a medieval French manuscript.

Martyrs
- Born: Rome, Italy
- Died: c. 286; Rome, Italy
- Venerated in: Roman Catholic Church, Eastern Orthodox Church
- Major shrine: Church of Santi Cosma e Damiano, Rome
- Feast: 18 June (Roman Catholic Church), 18 December (Eastern Orthodox Church)

Mark and Marcellian (Latin: Marcus et Marcellianus) are martyrs venerated as saints by the Roman Catholic Church and the Eastern Orthodox Church. Their cult is sometimes associated with that of Saints Tranquillinus, Martia, Nicostratus, Zoe, Castulus, and Tiburtius, though not in the official liturgical books of the Church, which mention only Mark and Marcellianus (in first place) among the saints for 18 June. Their mention in the General Roman Calendar on that date from before the time of the Tridentine calendar was removed in the 1969 revision, because nothing is known about them except their names, the fact of their martyrdom, and that they were buried on 18 June in the cemetery of Santa Balbina on the Via Ardeatina.

Their legend states that they were martyred at Rome under the Emperor Diocletian towards the end of the third century, most likely in the year 286. They are mentioned in most of the ancient martyrologies, including the Roman Martyrology, and their martyrdom is described in the Acts of St Sebastian, which, though ancient, is largely legendary.

== Legend ==
According to tradition, Mark and Marcellian were twin brothers from a distinguished family. They lived in Rome and became deacons in the early Church. When they refused to sacrifice to the Roman gods, they were arrested. Their parents, Tranquillinus and Martia, visited them in prison, urging them to renounce their being Christians.

However, Sebastian convinced them not to abandon their faith. Sebastian converted Tranquillinus and Martia, as well as Tiburtius, the son of Agrestius Chromatius, allegedly prefect of Rome. Nicostratus, another official, and his wife Zoe, were also converted. According to the legend, Zoe had been a mute for six years. However, she made known to Sebastian her desire to convert to the Church. As soon as she had, her speech returned to her. Nicostratus then brought the rest of the prisoners; these were sixteen people who were also converted by Sebastian.

Chromatius and Tiburtius became converts, and Chromatius set free all his prisoners, resigned his position, and retired to Campania.

Mark and Marcellian were concealed by Castulus, a Christian officer, but they were betrayed by an apostate, Torquatus. The twins were again taken into custody. Chromatius's alleged successor Fabianus condemned them to be bound head downwards to two pillars with their feet nailed to them. Mark and Marcellian hung there for a full day until they were pierced with lances. The twins were buried in the Via Ardeatina, near the cemetery of Domitilla.

Meanwhile, Zoe was hung to the branch of a tree and a fire was kindled underneath her feet, and she was killed. Nicostratus and five others were drowned in the Tiber. Tiburtius was thrown into a ditch and buried alive.

== Veneration ==
The bodies of Marcus and Marcellianus were moved, probably during the ninth century, to the Church of Santi Cosma e Damiano. They were discovered there in 1583 during the reign of Pope Gregory XIII.

The bodies remain there in a tomb, near an ancient painting of the two martyrs with a third person, who appears to be the Virgin Mary. In 1902, their basilica in the catacombs of Saint Balbina was rediscovered.
