= Chromatius of Rome =

Agrestius Chromatius was vicar to the city prefect in Rome under Diocletian. He had an ornate palace in the Parione district.

Chromatius condemned several martyrs to death during the reign of Carinus. According to a legend of Saint Sebastian, Chromatius was later converted to Christianity by Tranquillinus and baptized by Polycarp. This happened because of Tranquillinus' testimony that he had been cured of gout during baptism. Chromatius suffered from the same malady, so he sent for Polycarp, who baptized him, and he was also healed.

After becoming a Christian, Chromatius released the prisoners and freed his slaves. He then retired and was succeeded by Fabianus. Chromatius lived quietly on his country estate for many years, welcoming other Christians into his home to protect them from persecution.

Chromatius had a son, Tiburtius, who was baptized through the persuasion of Sebastian, who served as his godfather. Tiburtius was ordained a subdeacon. During the persecution by Diocletian he took shelter in his father's house. He was later betrayed by an apostate, tortured and beheaded. Tiburtius is held to be a saint by the Roman Catholic Church.

Chromatius is said to have also been martyred. However, no details of his martyrdom remain. According to Alban Butler, Chromatius was mentioned in several ancient martyrologies along with his son Tiburtius; they are commemorated on August 11.
