= Mirror writing =

Text written in the opposite to usual direction

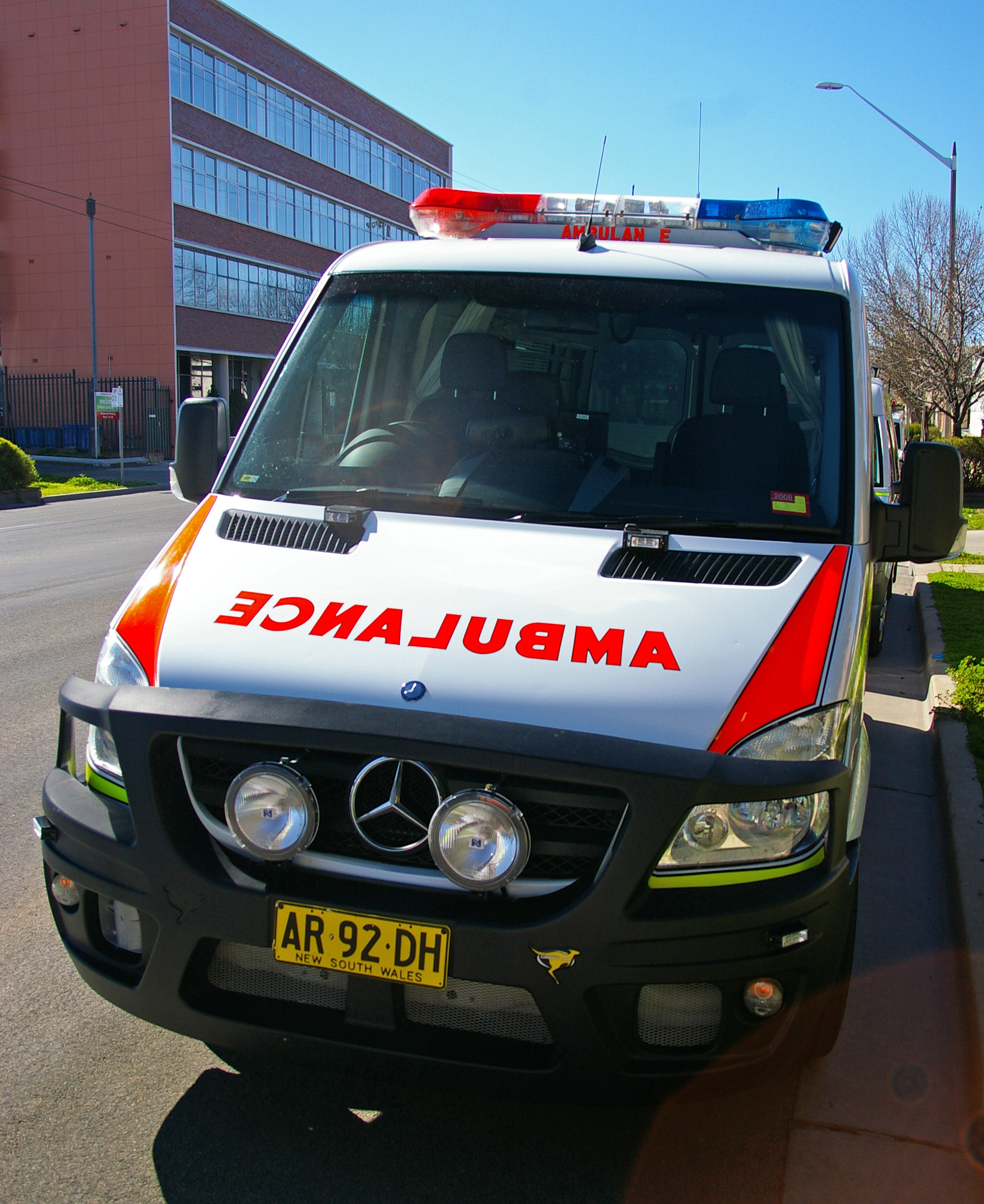
Mirror writing on the hood of an ambulance in Australia

Mirror writing is formed by writing in the direction that is the reverse of the natural way for a given language, such that the result is the mirror image of normal writing: it appears normal when reflected in a mirror. It is sometimes used as an extremely primitive form of cipher. A common modern usage of mirror writing can be found on the front of emergency vehicles such as police cars, fire engines and ambulances, where the word "POLICE", "FIRE" or "AMBULANCE" is often written in very large mirrored text, so that drivers see the word the right way around in their rear-view mirrors.

Some people are able to produce handwritten mirrored text. Notably, Leonardo da Vinci wrote most of his personal notes in this way. Mirror writing calligraphy was popular in the Ottoman Empire, where it often carried mystical associations.

== Ability to write mirrored text ==
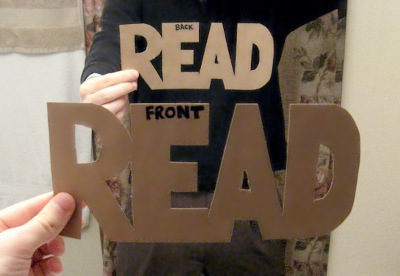
An example of how a mirror flips text front to back rather than left to right. This cardboard word is reflected properly in the mirror without being flipped.

An informal Australian newspaper experiment identified 10 true mirror-writers in a readership of 65,000. A higher proportion of left-handed people are better mirror writers than right-handed people, perhaps because it is more natural for a left-hander to write from right to left. 15% of left-handed people have the language centres in both halves of their brain. The cerebral cortex and motor homunculus are affected by this, causing the person to be able to read and write backwards quite naturally.

In an experiment conducted by the Department of Neurosurgery at Hokkaido University School of Medicine in Sapporo, Japan, scientists proposed that the origin of mirror writing comes from damage caused through brain trauma or neurological diseases, such as an essential tremor, Parkinson's disease, or spino-cerebellar degeneration. This hypothesis was proposed because these conditions affect a "neural mechanism that controls the higher cerebral function of writing via the thalamus." Another study by the same university discovered that damage was not the only cause. The scientists observed that normal children exhibited signs of mirror writing while learning to write, thus concluding that currently there is no exact method for finding the true origin of mirror writing.

== Notable examples ==
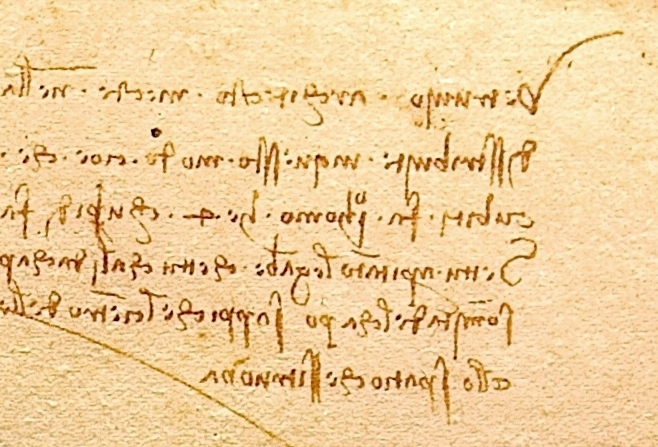
The notes on Leonardo da Vinci's famous Vitruvian Man image are in mirror writing.

Leonardo da Vinci wrote most of his personal notes in mirror writing, using standard writing only if he intended his texts to be read by others. The purpose of this practice by Leonardo remains unknown, though several possible reasons have been suggested. For example, writing left handed from left to right would have been messy because the ink just put down would smudge as his hand moved across it. Writing in reverse would prevent such smudging.

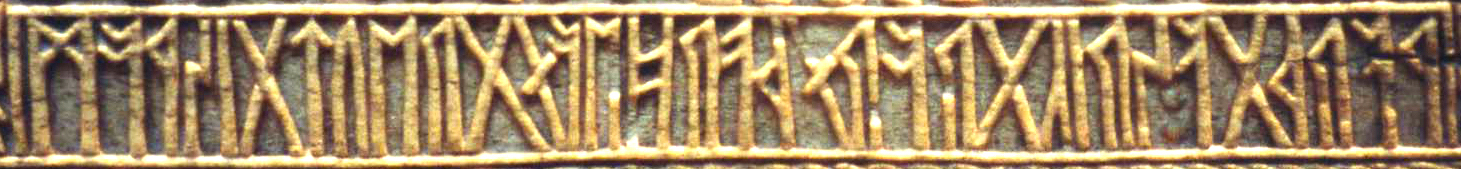
Runic mirror writing on the Franks Casket

The second line of the Old English riddle on the front panel of the 8th century Franks Casket is mirror-written in Anglo-Saxon runes.

Matteo Zaccolini may have written his original four volume treatise on optics, colour, and perspective in the early 17th century in mirror script.

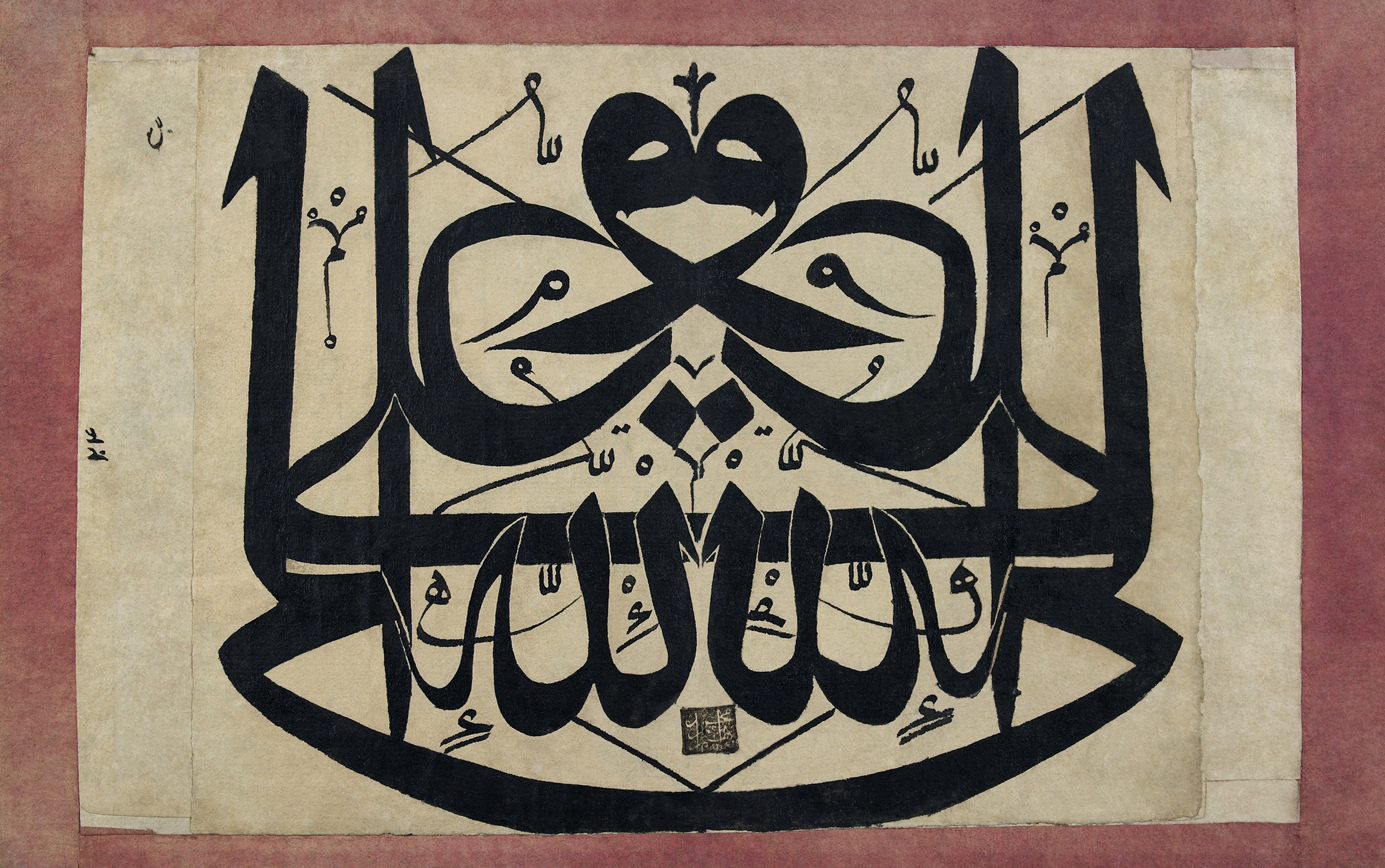
Eighteenth-century mirror writing in Ottoman calligraphy. Depicts the phrase Ali is the vicegerent of God in both directions.

Pictorial texts also known as calligrams arranged in mirror symmetry were popular in the Ottoman Empire during the 18th and 19th centuries among the Bektashi order, where it often carried mystical associations. The origins of this mirror writing tradition may date to the pre-Islamic period in rock inscriptions of the western Arabian peninsula. A recent study that has revealed the oldest examples of mirror writing in Greek traces the early appearance of mirror inscriptions to late antiquity, specifically to Syria-Palestine, Egypt, and Constantinople. In Islamic art, mirror calligraphy is known as muthanna or musanna.

== See also ==
- Ahriman – Middle Persian word traditionally written upside down
- Ambigram – Symmetrical calligraphic or typographic visual pun
- Faux Cyrillic – Several Cyrillic alphabet characters closely resemble mirrored Latin characters
