= Cesare Nebbia =

Italian painter (c.1536–1614)

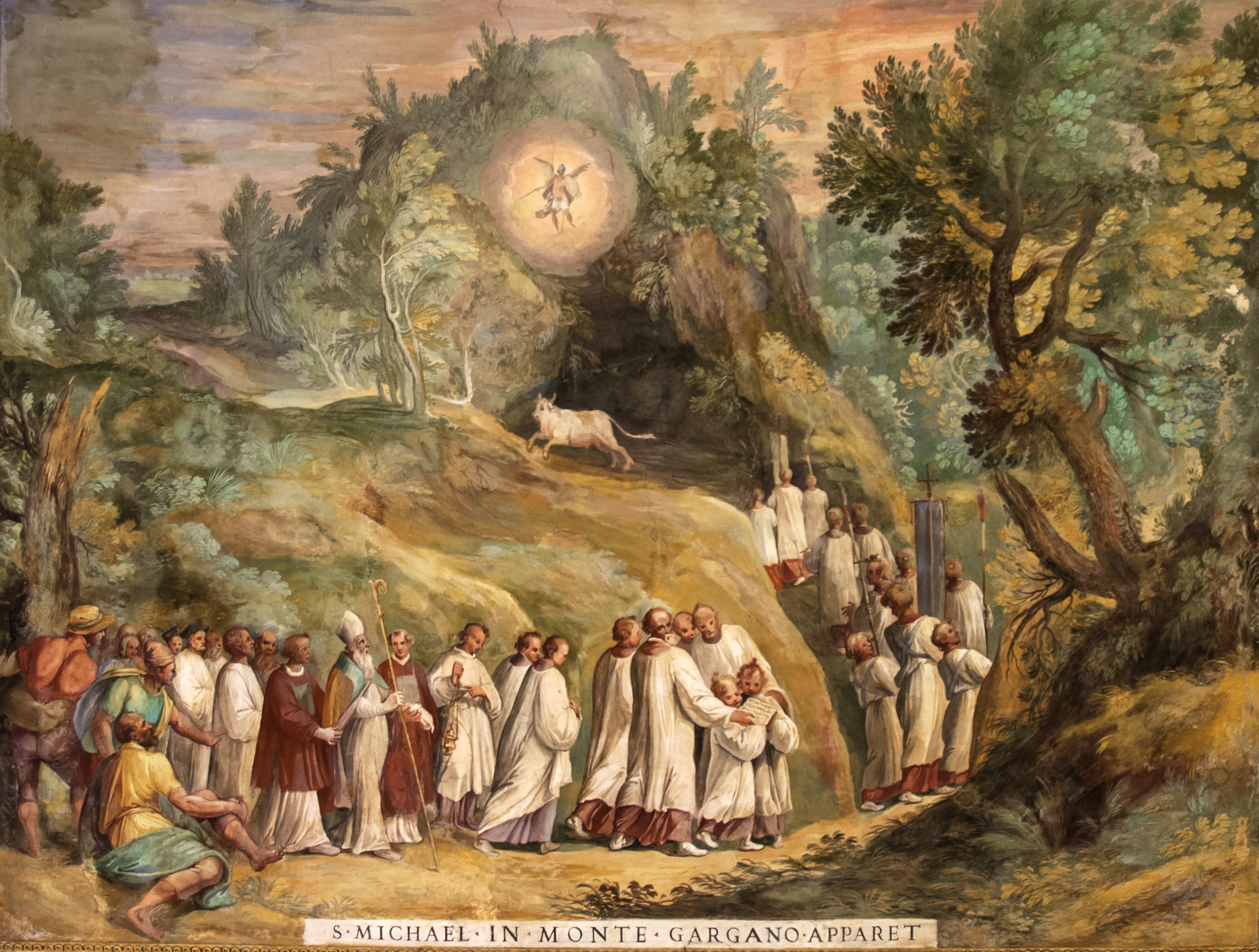
Archangel Michael appearing at Monte Gargano in a Cesare Nebbia ceiling painting in the Vatican Gallery of Maps.

Cesare Nebbia (c. 1536 – 1614) was an Italian Mannerist painter from Orvieto.

== Biography ==
Nebbia was born in Orvieto. He trained with Girolamo Muziano, with whom he helped complete a flurry of decoration that was added to the Cathedral of Orvieto in the 1560s. Almost all the remaining work in Orvieto is now in the Museo del Duomo.

Nebbia and Muziano participated in many of the premier projects in late 16th-century Rome. Along with Muziano's other assistant, Giovanni Guerra, they decorated the Gregorian Chapel in St Peter's Basilica during the pontificate of Gregory XIII (1572–1585). Other Mannerist painters involved in this enterprise were Taddeo and Federico Zuccari, Niccolò Circignani, and Hendrick van den Broeck (known as Arrigo Fiammingo).

The fresco decorations in Palazzo Simonelli in Torre San Severo (near Orvieto) have been attributed to Nebbia. In 1576, he painted a Resurrection of Lazarus for the Church of Santa Maria dei Servi in Città della Pieve.

Nebbia and Guerra together supervised the two major fresco commissions of the pontificate of Pope Sixtus V (1585–1590). Starting in 1586, they participated in the painting of scenes from the Life of the Virgin in the church of Santa Maria Maggiore and its new Capella Sistina (not to be confused with the more famous Sistine Chapel). Giovanni Baglione identifies these frescos as the collaborative work of ten painters:

1. Cesare Nebbia
2. Hendrick van den Broeck
3. Angelo from Orvieto
4. Ercolino from Bologna
5. Salvatore Fontana
6. Lattanzio Mainardi
7. Ferdinando Sermei
8. Giacomo Stella
9. Giovanni Battista Pozzo
10. Paris Nogari.

During the refurbishment of the Lateran palace and church of San Giovanni in Laterano, Nebbia and Guerra painted in the Scala Sancta and the papal Sancta Sanctorum, the chapel of St. Lawrence. This project employed an overlapping crew of artists, including Giovanni Baglione himself, Stella, Giovanni Battista Pozzo, Nogari, Prospero Orsi, Ferraù Fenzoni, Paul Bril, Paolo Guidotti, Giovanni Battista Ricci, Cesare Torelli, Antonio Vivarini, Andrea Lilio, Cesare and Vicenzo Conti, Baldassare Croce, Ventura Salimbeni, and Antonio Scalvati. Numerous preliminary drawings by Nebbia exist for these frescoes.

Nebbia helped paint galleries in Vatican libraries, including the ceilings of the map gallery. During the papacy of Clement VIII he designed the pendentive mosaics depicting the Evangelists Matthew and Mark for St. Peter's Basilica. He painted a Crucifixion for Borghese chapel in the church of Trinità dei Monti. He painted a Resurrection for San Giacomo degli Spagnoli. He painted a Coronation of the Virgin for the church of Santa Maria dei Monti.

Along with the painter known as il Bertoia, Federico Zuccari and others, he helped fresco the walls of the Oratorio del Gonfalone in Rome. He also contributed to the decoration of the Oratory of Santissimo Crocifisso.

In 1603-1604, he moved to Milan where he worked for Federico Borromeo painting a series of frescoes on the life of the Blessed Carlo Borromeo for various sites, including the Collegio Borromeo in Pavia, the collegiata di Arona, and the Palazzo Borromeo on Isola Bella.

He became the prince of the San Luca Academy in 1597.
