= St. Susanna Church (Dedham, Massachusetts) =

Catholic church in Dedham, Massachusetts

- St. Susanna Church
- 42.268°N 71.185°W
- Location: Dedham, Massachusetts
- Address: 262 Needham St
- Country: United States
- Denomination: Roman Catholicism
- Website: www.saintsusanna.org

History
- Founded: February 1960; 66 years ago

Administration
- Archdiocese: Archdiocese of Boston

St. Susanna Church is a Roman Catholic parish of the Archdiocese of Boston. It is located in Dedham, Massachusetts, at 262 Needham St. The pastor is Father Stephen S. Josoma, and Laurence J. Bloom is the deacon. It is known as "one of the most liberal parishes in the Archdiocese of Boston."

== History ==
=== 20th century ===
The parish was founded in 1960 due to overcrowding at St. Mary of the Assumption Church in Dedham. By the 1930s St. Mary's was one of the biggest parishes in the Archdiocese with over 6,000 parishioners and 1,300 students in Sunday School. During the middle of that decade there were four priests and six nuns ministering to the congregation.

In the 1950s it became clear that a second parish was needed in Dedham, (Note: The population of the town as a whole more than doubled between 1930 and 1970.) and so St. Susanna's was established in February 1960 to serve the needs of the Riverdale neighborhood. When St. Susanna's opened it had 300 families, while 2,500 stayed at St. Mary's.

During construction, masses were held at Moseley's on the Charles. The first pastor of St. Susana's, Father Michael Durant, lived at St. Mary's while his church was being constructed. The first mass was said in the new church on February 11, 1962. The church was named by Cardinal Richard Cushing after his titular church, Santa Susanna, in Rome.

=== 21st century ===
In 2000, average attendance at Sunday mass was 1,671, making it the 63rd most active parish out of the 357 parishes then in the archdiocese. It performed the 314th most sacraments in 2001–2002.

The parish is a member of Parishes Organized to Welcome Immigrants and Refugees (POWIR).

=== Nativity scene controversy ===
The parish garnered the attention of national media during Advent 2018 when the Nativity scene outside of the church showed the Baby Jesus in a cage and the three wise men separated from the others by a fence labeled "deportation." The scene was a statement on the Trump administration family separation policy and on the condition of refugees more generally.

In 2025, the parish altered their Christmas nativity display, removing the figurines of Jesus, Joseph and Mary and replacing them with an "ICE Was Here" sign, referring to the United States Immigration and Customs Enforcement agency, while also displaying a phone number to report activity by ICE agents in the area. The Boston Archdiocese requested that the sign be removed, stating that Church law required that sacred objects were to be "used solely to foster faith and devotion," and not for political messaging.

Rev. Stephen Josoma, the pastor, said the sign was his idea and highlighted the need for the message, saying that "any divisiveness is a reflection of our polarized society" and criticizing the "changing, unjust policies and laws" on immigration of the second Trump administration; on the other hand, critics of the initiative called it a "crackpot publicity stunt". C.J. Doyle, executive director of the Catholic Action League of Massachusetts, described the display as "offensive" and said he had received a complaint about it from a parishioner.

The parish has a history of making similar displays; in 2017, they showed some of scene partially submerged in water to draw attention to climate change. (Note: St. Susanna is not the only Catholic church in the United States to make similar displays. Lake Street Church in Evanston, Illinois showed Mary and Joseph wearing gas masks and the baby Jesus bound with zip ties. The Urban Village Church in Chicago suburb River Forest removed all three figures, replacing them with a sign that read "Due to ICE activity in our community, the Holy Family is in hiding".) Josoma says the parish "tries to hold a mirror up to the world around us and reflect the celebration of Christmas (the mystery of the Incarnation) with the reality of the world around us."

== Works cited ==
- Smith, Frank (1936). A History of Dedham, Massachusetts. Transcript Press. "st mary dedham."
