= Paris Nogari =

Italian painter (c.1536–1601)

Paris Nogari (c. 1536–1601) was an Italian painter of the Renaissance period, a minor pupil of Cesare Nebbia active mainly in Rome. He painted in the library of the Vatican in a style resembling Raffaellino da Reggio and was among the painters who frescoed Santa Susanna and San Pietro in Vincoli in Rome.
