= Cesare and Vincenzo Conti =

Italian painters

Cesare and Vincenzo Conti, two brothers, were natives of Ancona, but went to Rome during the Pontificate of Gregory XIII, by whom they were employed. They were also both employed by his successors, Sixtus V, Clement VIII, and Paul V. Cesare was esteemed for his grotesque ornaments, and Vincenzo painted the figures. Cesare died at Macerata about 1615. Vincenzo went on to the court of Savoy, and died there in 1610. Some of their works are in Santa Maria in Trastevere, while in San Spirito in Sassia is the history of San Giacomo del Zucchi, and in Santa Cecilia, 'St. Agnes,' and the 'Martyrdom of St. Urban.'
