= Carlo Lambardi =

Italian architect

Carlo Lambardi or Lombardi (1559 – 1620) was an Italian architect of the late-Renaissance and early-Baroque period, active mainly in Rome.

He was born in Arezzo. He labored on the Palazzo Aldobrandini in the Quirinal district, the facade of Santa Prisca, and villa Giustinianini outside of Porta del Popolo. He wrote a book about the flooding of the Tiber.

During the reign of Pope Paul V, he was commissioned to design the marble portico and facade for the church of Santa Francesca Romana in the Roman Forum; this work was commissioned by Olivetan monks from a monastery adjacent to the church.
