= Achille Albacini =

Italian sculptor

Achille Albacini (April 19, 1841 –1914) was an Italian sculptor.

He was born in Rome, he was trained at the Accademia di San Luca. Among his works are:

- Rebecca
- Andromache
- Tamar in act of covering herself
- L'acquaiola Pompeiana
- Fioraia
- La Primavera
