= Cristoforo Casolani =

Italian painter

Cristoforo Casolani (c. 1552 – after 1606) was an Italian painter, active in Rome in a late-Renaissance or Mannerist styles.

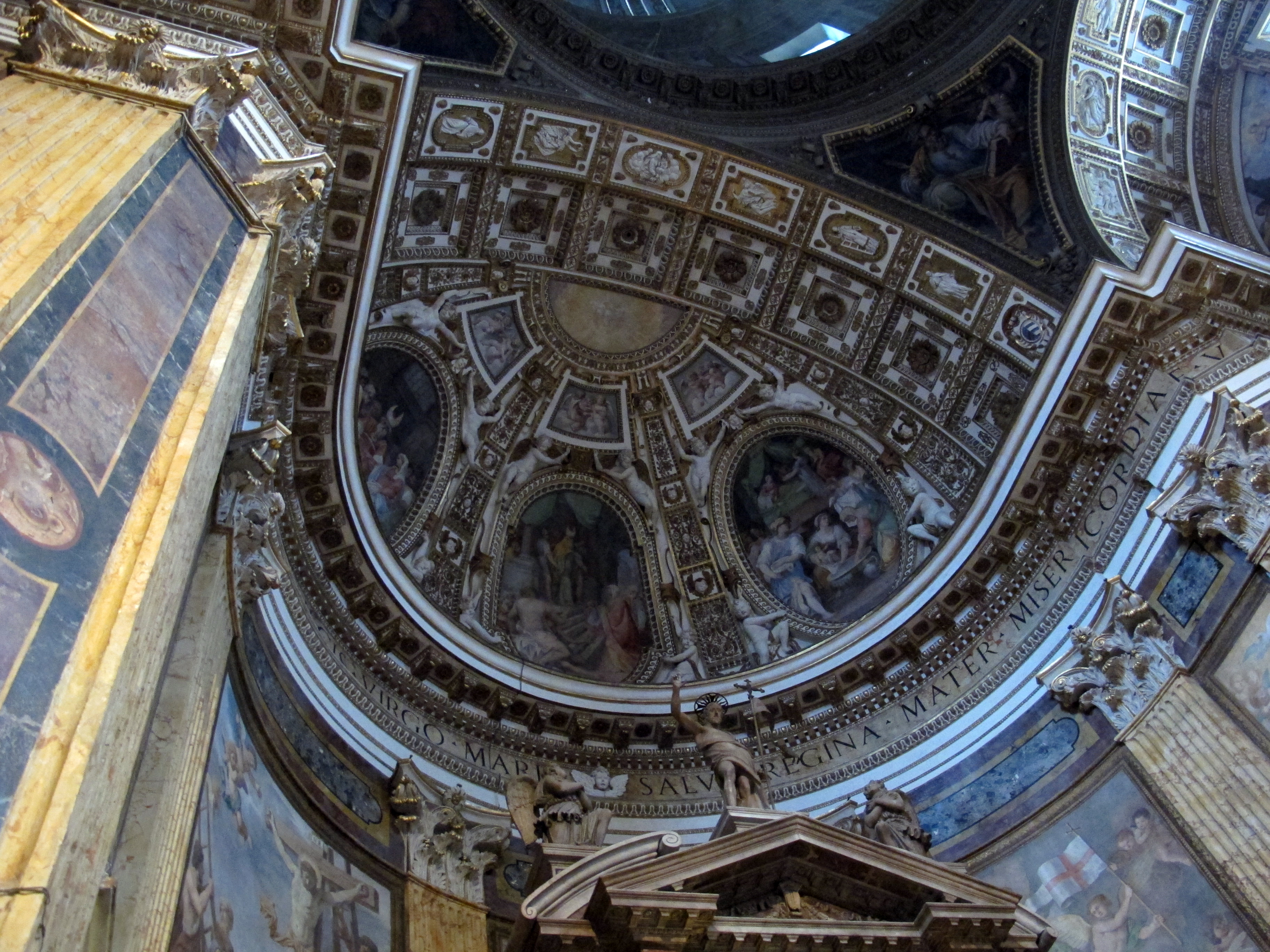
Santa Maria ai Monti frescoes

== Biography ==
Born in Rome, he contributed along with Giacinto Gimignani and Orazio Gentileschi to the apse ceiling frescoes of the church of Santa Maria ai Monti in Rome.
