= Susanna of Rome =

Christian martyr

Saint Susanna
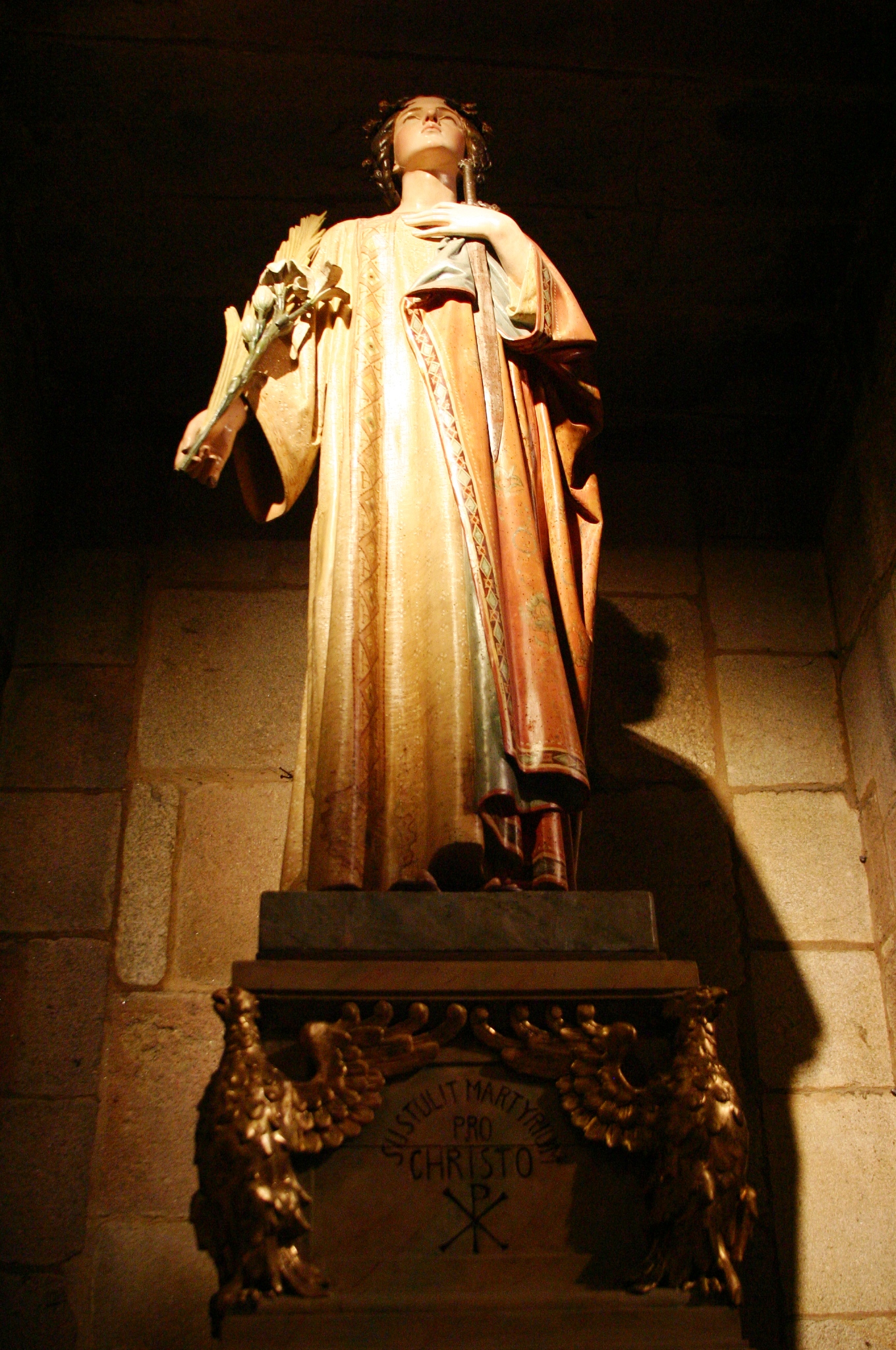
- Saint Susanna

Virgin and martyr
- Died: 3rd century Rome
- Venerated in: Eastern Orthodox Church; Roman Catholic Church; Oriental Orthodoxy
- Major shrine: Santa Susanna in Rome
- Feast: 11 August
- Attributes: martyr's palm, sword, holding lilies

Susanna of Rome (fl. 3rd century) was a Christian martyr of the Diocletianic Persecution. Her existing hagiography, written between about 450 and 500 AD, is of no historical value and the relations it attributes to Susanna are entirely fictitious. It is probable that a real martyr named Susanna lies behind the literary invention.

Her feast day is on 11 August in the Roman Martyrology, but since 1969 her veneration has been limited to the Church of Santa Susanna in Rome. She has no connection to Saint Tiburtius, who is commemorated on the same day. The Church of Santa Susanna was originally that of Gaius, but by 595 it was named after Susanna, possibly because of the popularity of her hagiography.

In addition to her main shrine in Rome, a church exists in Santiago de Compostela dedicated to her; it was first built in the early twelfth century after her relics were translated from Braga to Compostela by Diego Gelmírez according to the Historia Compostelana. Susanna is the co-patron of the city along with St. James.

== Legend ==
Saint Susanna, virgin and martyr, is said to have been the daughter of Saint Gabinus of Rome. The lengthy account given of her in mediaeval legend is, however, unreliable. The account claims that on her refusal to marry a pagan relative of the Emperor Diocletian, she was arrested as a Christian. According to her Acts, she was beheaded about the year 295, at the command of Diocletian, in her father's house, which was turned into a church together with the adjoining one belonging to her uncle, the prefect Caius or, according to other accounts, Pope Caius. The church became known as Sancta Susanna ad duas domos.

Susanna is mentioned in the Roman Martyrology for 11 August in the following terms: "At Rome, commemoration of Saint Susanna, in whose name, which was mentioned among the martyrs in ancient lists, the basilica of the titular church of Gaius at the Baths of Diocletian was dedicated to God in the sixth century." The commemoration of her that was included in the General Roman Calendar was removed in 1969 because of the legendary character of the Acts of her martyrdom.
