= Gabinus =

Saint Gabinus (commonly anglicized as Saint Gavin or Saint Gabin) is the title given to two personages.

- Saint Gabinus, who died as a martyr at Porto Torres, Sardinia, Italy (the ancient Turris) sometime in the second century under Emperor Hadrian. He was martyred alongside a Saint Crispulus. His feast day is May 30, along with Crispulus, in the Roman Martyrology, the official though professedly incomplete list of saints recognized by the Roman Catholic Church. According to a twelfth-century Passio, Gabinus was a Roman soldier put in charge of a priest and a deacon imprisoned for their faith, they converted him to Christianity, and all three died as martyrs. Each year on 3 May three wooden statues representing the three martyrs are taken in procession from the Basilica of Saint Gabinus (Basilica di San Gavino), the largest and oldest of the Romanesque church of Sardinia, to a little church where there are three rock-cut tombs of Roman times. in which the statues are placed until Pentecost. The little church then becomes a place of pilgrimage until the statues are return to the basilica in another procession on Pentecost evening, after which the little church remains closed until the following 3 May.
- Saint Gabinus, said to be the father of Saint Susanna and brother of Pope Caius (283-296), and, though a relative of Emperor Diocletian to have been beheaded in 296 for refusing to sacrifice to the pagan gods. His relics are venerated in Holy Trinity church in Lyon, France, where his feast day is celebrated on 19 February and is also included on that date in the Roman Martyrology.
