= Baldassare Croce =

Italian painter

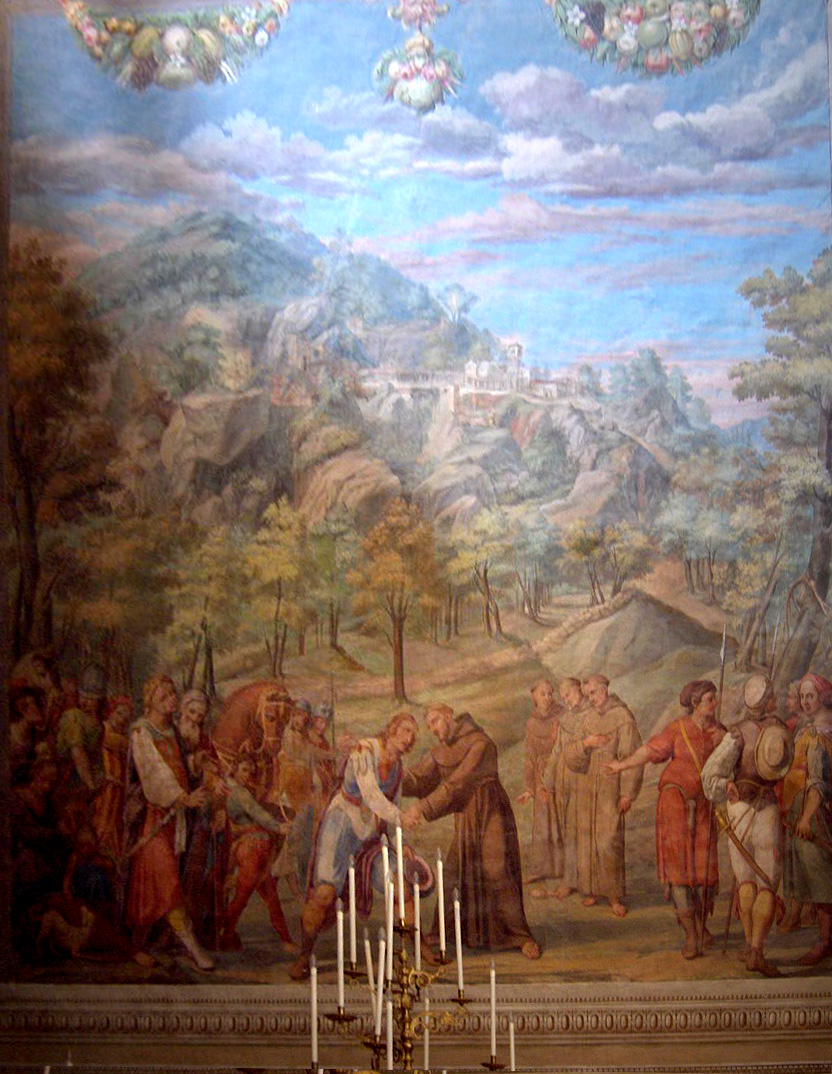
St. Francis of Assisi receives laypeople into his Third Order by Baldassare Croce, 1602–1603.

Baldassare Croce (Bologna, 1558–8 November 1628) was an Italian painter, active during the late Mannerist period, active mainly in and around Rome.

== Biography ==
He trained in Bologna and moved to Rome by 1581. Known as a prolific academic painter in Rome, he was named director of the Academy of St. Luke. He painted for the Sala Clementina of the Vatican palace, for the Chapel of San Francesco at the Gesù, San Giovanni in Laterano, and San Giacomo degli Spagnoli. He painted six large frescoes along the nave of the church of Santa Susanna, depicting the life of the Susanna from the Old Testament. He worked under Cesare Nebbia and Giovanni Guerra in the decoration of the Scala Santa in San Giovanni in Laterano. In January 1628, he was named Principe (Prince) of the Accademia di San Luca in Rome.
