= Raffaellino da Reggio =

Italian painter (1550–1578)

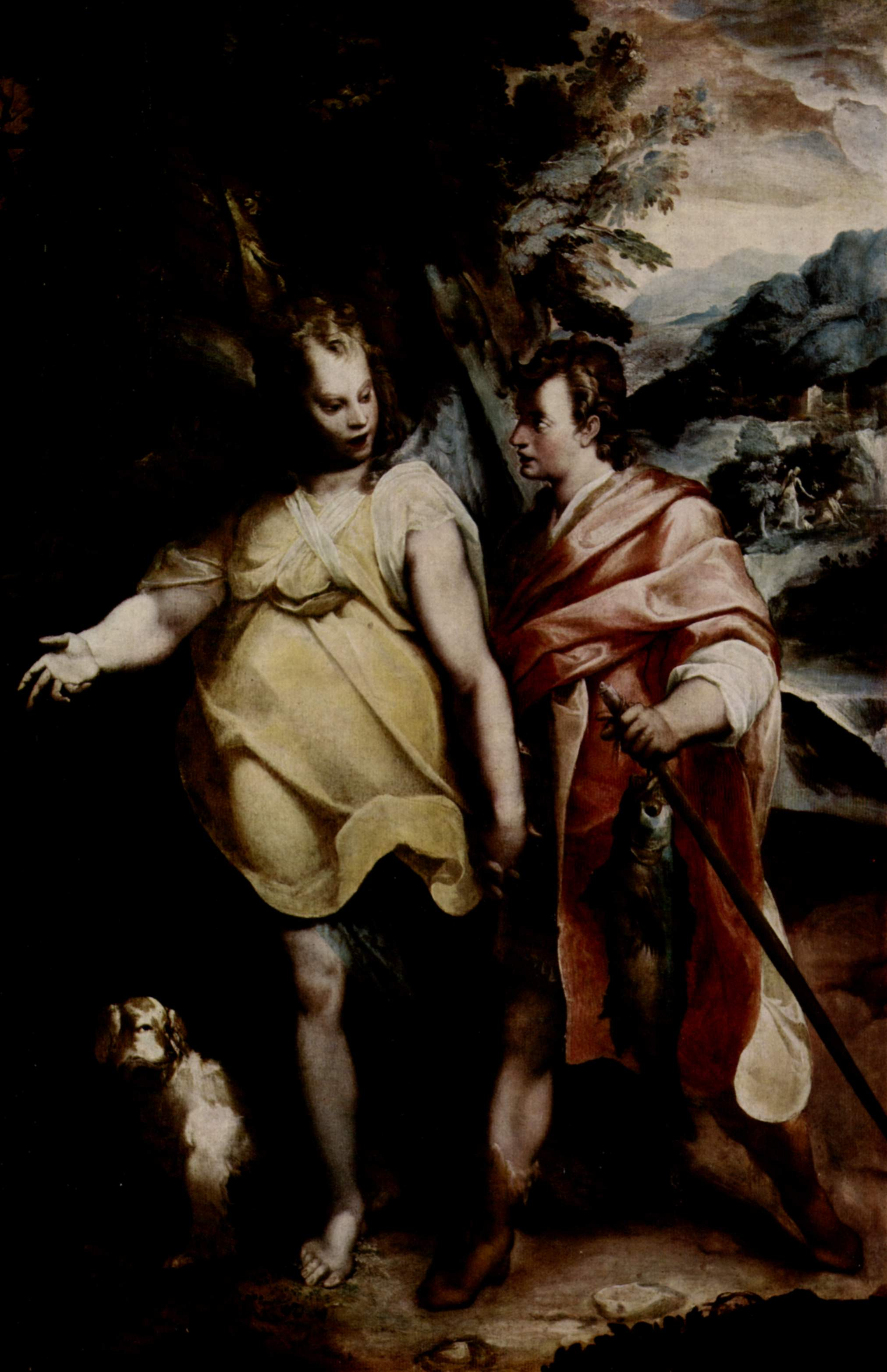
Tobias and the Angel, (oil on panel, ca. 1575–1576) by Raffaellino da Reggio, in the Galleria Borghese, Rome

Raffaele Motta (1550 – 1578), known as Raffaellino da Reggio, was an Italian Mannerist style painter from Reggio Emilia, who mainly worked in Rome. He assimilated the style of Taddeo Zuccari and also developed more personal traits. In the last three years of his short life, he worked alongside Lorenzo Sabbatini in works for the Vatican commissioned by Gregory XIII. The Late Mannerist painter and historian Giovanni Baglione considered Raffaellino's early death a significant loss to art.

== Biography ==
He was born in Codemondo near Reggio Emilia in 1550. According to his earliest biographer, Bonifacio Fantini, he was a builder's son who initially trained under Lelio Orsi in his studio in nearby Novellara, as well as with a medallist, Alfonso Ruspagiari. Fantini says he painted facades in Reggio Emilia and in Guastalla, where he worked for Cesare Gonzaga.

By December 1570, he was in Rome, performing a commission for the cardinal Ippolito d’Este. In 1575, he worked with Giovanni de' Vecchi at the Villa Farnese in Caprarola, painting in the Sala del Mappamondo (World Map) and the Camera degli Angeli. He also painted frescos for the Oratory of Gonfalone in Rome, including a depiction of Christ before Caiaphas. He painted a Martyrdom of the four crowned saints for the Capella di San Silvestro in the church of Santi Quattro Coronati in Rome. In the last three years of his short life, he worked extensively at the Vatican alongside the Bolognese artist, Lorenzo Sabbatini, in work commissioned by Gregory XIII. He also appears to have worked in the Palazzino Gambara at Villa Lante in Bagnaia.

Taken together, his work in Rome displays an eclectic approach, often though not always assuming stylistic traits of the late Taddeo Zuccari (he sometimes worked alongside Federico Zuccari, Taddeo's younger brother). The compositional felicities of his depictions of Tobias and the Angel and Diana and Acteon, two of his surviving oil paintings, suggest an ideal stylistic connection with Correggio.

He died prematurely in Rome in 1578 at around 28 years of age, overcome, according to Giovanni Baglione, by "malignant fever".

In his artist's biography, Baglione enthused that "if a man of such talent as Raffaellino had lived longer, he would have moved on to amazing things". This assessment of his broader artistic potential has gained some recent critical support.

== Early biographical sources ==
- Baglione, Giovanni (1733). "Raffaellino da Reggio, Pittore". Le vite de ̕pittori, scultori, architetti, ed intagliatori, dal pontificato di Gregorio XIII: del 1572 fino a ̕tempi di papa Urbano VIII nel 1642 (in Italian). Naples: Con Licenza de' Superiori, e Privilegie (published 1642). pp. 23–27.
- Fantini, Bonifacio (1850). "Raffaellino da Reggio, Pittore". Breve trattato della vita di Raffaele Mota reggiano pittore famosissimo pubblicato pel fausto maritaggio della signora Marchesa Anna Pallavicino col signor conte Giovanni Simonetta (in Italian). Parma: Tipografia Carmignani (published 1616). pp. 34–39.
