= Saint Tiburtius =

Christian martyr

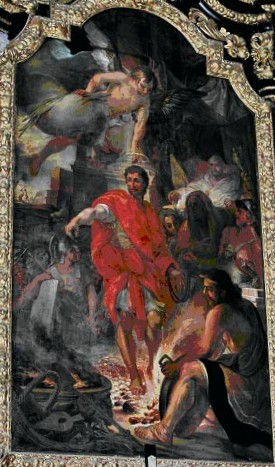
- Tiburtius walking on coals

Martyrs
- Died: 3rd century Rome
- Venerated in: Eastern Orthodox Church; Roman Catholic Church; Oriental Orthodoxy
- Feast: 11 August

Tiburtius, according to Christian legend, was a Christian martyr and saint. His feast day is 11 August which is the same as Saint Susanna. The two were not related, but are sometimes associated because they are venerated on the same day.

== Hagiography ==
The story is related in the legend of Sebastian that Agrestius Chromatius, allegedly prefect of Rome, condemned several Christians to death. The prefect, however, was converted by Tranquillinus, father of Mark and Marcellian, and baptized by Polycarp.

Tiburtius was the only son of Agrestius Chromatius; he was also baptized through the persuasion of Sebastian, who was his godfather in baptism, according to this legend.

Tiburtius lay hidden during the persecution by Roman Emperor Diocletian in his father's house. Accused by a traitor, he was brought before the (allegedly) prefect Fabianus and tried. He confessed his faith, which he confirmed by a miracle, for, protecting himself only by the sign of the cross, he walked barefoot over red-hot coals without suffering any injury. But the miracle was ascribed to magic and Tiburtius was beheaded at the third milestone of the Via Labicana in the year 286. The spot of execution was called "at the two laurel trees" (ad duas lauros).

Tiburtius is mentioned in 23 epigram of Pope Damasus I (366–384):

When the sword cut the pious entrails of the mother,
the outstanding martyr, despising the prince of the world,
seeks the heights of heaven in the company of Christ.
Here for you will ever remain saintly honour and praises.
Kind Tiburtius, beloved of God, I beg you take care of Damasus.

Tiburtius is spoken of in the Roman Martyrology for 11 August in the following terms: "At Rome, in the cemetery at the two laurel trees at the third milestone on the Via Labicana, Saint Tiburtius, martyr, whose praises Pope Saint Damasus sang." The commemoration of him that was included in the General Roman Calendar was removed in 1969, because "apart from his name, the only thing known of him is that he was buried in the Inter duas lauros cemetery on the Via Labicana on an 11 August".
