= Pozzi (surname) =

Pozzi is an Italian surname. Notable people with the surname include:

- Alessandro Pozzi (born 1969), Italian former professional racing cyclist
- Ambra Pozzi, Italian American physician
- Andrea Pozzi (1778–1833), Italian painter of religious and mythologic histories
- Andrew Pozzi (born 1992), British athlete
- Angela Haseltine Pozzi (born 1957), American sculptor
- Antonia Pozzi (1912–1938), Italian poet
- Baby Pozzi (born 1963) - stage name of Maria Pozzi, Italian former pornographic film actress
- Carlo Ignazio Pozzi (1786–1842), painter and architect born at Mannheim, Germany
- Charles Pozzi (1909–2001), French racing driver
- Domenico Pozzi (1742–1796), painter of Swiss origin
- Elisabetta Pozzi (born 1955), Italian actress
- Francesco Pozzi (1742–1805), Italian engraver
- Gianluca Pozzi (born 1965), former tennis player from Italy
- Giovanni Battista Pozzi, Italian painter, born in Milan towards the end of the 17th century
- Henri Pozzi (1879–1946), French politician, diplomat and author
- Lucio Pozzi (born 1935), American artist born in Milan, Italy
- Maurizio Pozzi (born 1970), Italian cross country skier
- Moana Pozzi (1961–1994), Italian pornographic actress
- Nicola Pozzi (born 1986), Italian footballer
- Oscar Pozzi (born 1971), Italian former racing cyclist
- Piero Pozzi (1920–1991), retired Italian professional football player
- Pozzi Escot (born 1933), American composer
- Rocco Pozzi, Italian painter and engraver of the Baroque period
- Samuel Jean de Pozzi (1846–1918), French surgeon and gynecologist
- Sara Pozzi, Italian nuclear engineer
- Stefano Pozzi (1699–1768), Italian painter, designer, draughtsman and decorator
- Tancredi Pozzi (1864- 1924), Italian sculptor
- Alessio Pozzi (born 1995), Italian fashion model

== See also ==
- Pozzo (surname)
- Pozzi (disambiguation)
