= Pozza =

Pozza may refer to:

- Housa or Pozza or Pucić family,
- Pozza di Fassa, frazione of Sèn Jan di Fassa in Trentino in the northern Italian region
- Carlo Dalla Pozza (1942 – 2014), Italian philosopher of science and logician
- Michele Pezza (1771– 1806), a guerrilla leader who resisted the French occupation of Naples
- Stefano Pozza (born 1987), Italian football defender

== See also ==
- Pazza
- Pozzi (disambiguation)
- Pozzo (disambiguation)
