= Francesco Pozzi =

Italian painter

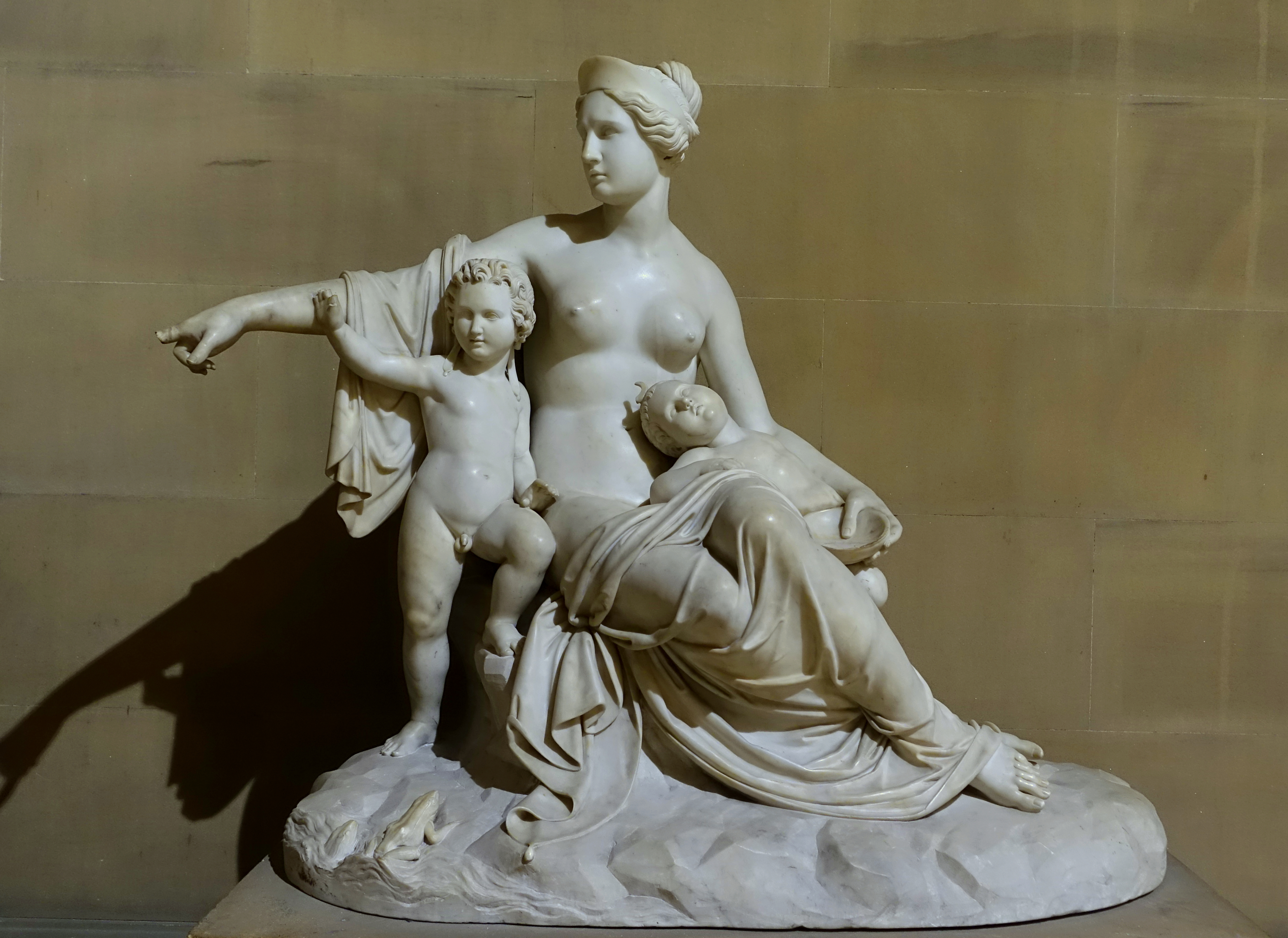
Leto with the infants Apollo and Artemis, by Francesco Pozzi (1824)

Francesco Pozzi (1742–?) was an Italian engraver and sculptor.

He was born at Rome and was son of sculptor Stefano Pozzi, the nephew on his father's side of Rocco Pozzi and on his mother's side of Girolamo Frezza. In conjunction with Coppa and Perini, he engraved some of the plates from the statues in the Clementine Gallery at the Vatican. He also engraved a portrait of Pope Pius VI.

As a sculptor he made a Latona with the infants Apollo and Artemis in Chatsworth House (1824) and the copy of a stolen satyr in the Fountain of Neptune, Florence.
