= Santa Maria del Carmine, Civita Castellana =

Santa Maria del Carmine, once known as Santa Maria dell'Arco is a Romanesque-style, Roman Catholic church located at the intersection of the Vi Flaminia with Via Ferretti in the town of Civita Castellana, province of Viterbo, region of Lazio, Italy.

== History ==
The former church was named because the entrance was reached by passing under an arch. Tradition holds that this church was once used as Cathedral prior to the present Duomo of Civita Castellana. It appears to date from either the 8th or 9th centuries, with a three nave structure reflected in the façade. The columns are derived from spolia, and the bases are now underneath the present brick pavement, with the exception of the first and third columns on the left. The church has undergone numerous refurbishments, including a major reconstruction in the 16th century. The belltower still retains the Romanesque mullioned windows.
