= Villa Tesoriera =

Rural palace in Turin, Italy

Coordinates: 45°04′37″N 7°38′19″E

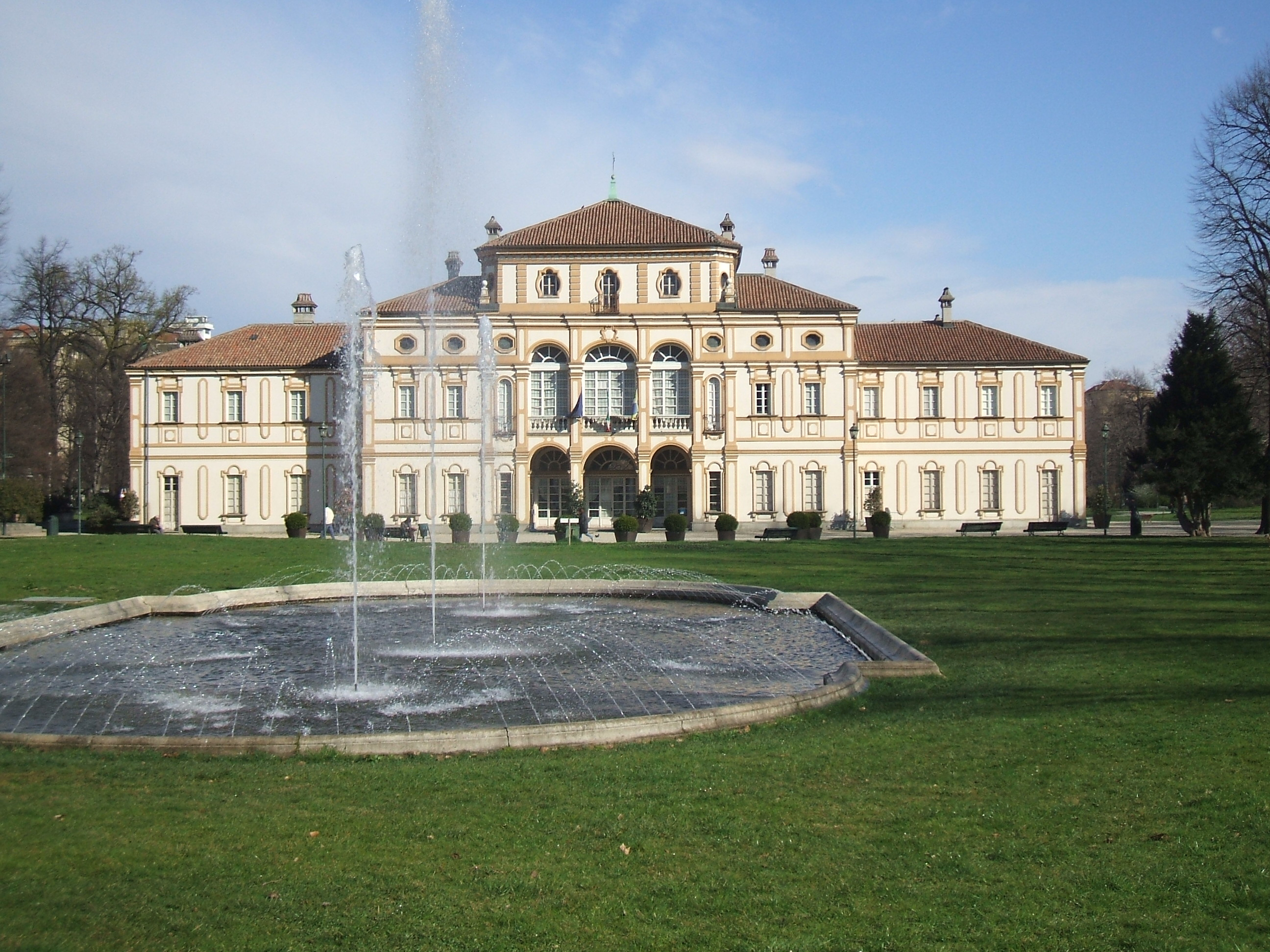
Facade of Villa

Villa Tesoriera, also known as La Tesoriera or Villa Sartirana, is a Baroque-style rural palace located at Corso Francia 186, Turin, Italy. The villa since 2014 was the home of the non-profit organization of Villa of Composers that links active composers of written music with libraries of written music. The villa is surrounded by a large park.

== History ==
The central core of the Villa was built between 1713 and 1715 for Aymo Ferrero Cocconato, treasurer of the Duke of Savoy and King of Sicily, Victor Amadeus II. On the south wall of the first floor of the Villa, a painted plaque attributes the design to Jacopo Maggi (Cremona, 1658-1739), a scenographer, costume designer and impresario of the Teatro Regio in Turin. The frescoes of the Grand Salon have been attributed to Giovanni Battista Pozzo.

In the century after the treasurer's death in 1723, the villa had many owners. In 1869, it was purchased by the Marquis Ferdinando Arborio Gattinara di Breme, Duke of Sartirana, senator of the Kingdom and director of the Accademia Albertina. He commissioned the French- and Dutch-style gardens, and built an east wing addition to the Villa. Multiple contemporary authors comment on the eclectic richness of the holdings in the Villa in this era. After further change of owners, in 1934, the villa was inherited by Prince Amedeo of Savoy, Duke of Aosta, who added a symmetrical west wing.

The villa was looted during the German army occupation from 1943 and 1944. During the occupation valuable library and furniture collections belonging to the Marquis di Breme went missing. In 2009, now belonging to the City of Turin, more than 2 million euros worth of restoration, and it reopened in 2012, housing the collections of the Andrea della Corte music library. In 2014, the City of Turin partnered with the Villa of Composers, notably to house and update the scores classified in its musical works library.
