= Madonna della Porta, Racconigi =

Church in Cuneo province, Italy

Coordinates: 44°46′00.5″N 7°40′47.1″E

The Chiesa della Madonna della Porta is a Roman Catholic church in Racconigi, Province of Cuneo, region of Piedmont, Italy.

== History ==
The church was erected and dedicated to the Madonna in gratitude for the cessation of the plague epidemic in 1630–31 that killed nearly a quarter of the inhabitants. Residents seeking protection prayed to an icon of the Virgin found near the gate of the city. The fresco was replaced by a painting. In the late 17th century, when the walls were torn down, a church was erected at the site to shelter the image, patronized by Giovanni Angelo Spada, his coat of arms is in the presbytery. The church housed the Compagnia delle Umiliate, a flagellant confraternity.

In 1700, Giovanni Battista Pozzo painted 8 canvases for the church of which six remain:

- Birth of the Virgin
- Presentation of Mary at the Temple
- Adoration of the Magi
- Flight to Egypt
- Marriage of the Virgin
- Circumcision

The main altarpiece was painted in 1631. The ceiling has elaborate 18th-century stucco decoration.
