= Pietro Nelli =

Italian painter

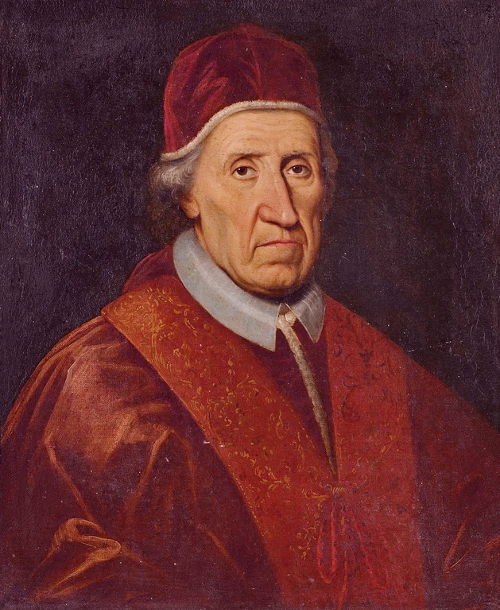
Portrait of Pope Clement XI (1710s)

Pietro Antonio Nelli (29 June 1672 – 1740) was an Italian painter of the Rococo period. He created religious works, portraits, and landscapes.

== Life and work ==
He was born in Massa. At an early age he went to Rome, where he was a pupil of Giovanni Maria Morandi, who also became a friend and supporter. He may have lived with him until 1717, when he died.

Pope Clement XI commissioned a portrait that is one of his best-known works. He was then appointed a Court Painter by the Albani family, a position he held until the time of Clement XII, and created numerous family portraits, including one of Cardinal Alessandro Albani. The Rospigliosi and Pallavicini families were also major patrons. Many of these works, and other portrayals of religious leaders, became widely familiar through engravings made by Girolamo Rossi, Niccolò Billy, and Giovanni Giacomo Frey. Some of these were later published in Serie de' Cardinali crea dall'anno 1700 all'anno 1773.

His religious works include an altarpiece for the Civita Castellana Cathedral and canvases for the church of Sant'Onofrio, Rome. In the Basilica of Santa Maria in Trastevere, he painted a panel depicting Jesus. He also decorated several parts of the church of San Lorenzo in Piscibus, but some are now missing.

He was a member of the Pontifical Academy of Fine Arts and Letters of the Virtuosi al Pantheon. His best-known student was Francesco Zuccarelli. His sister, Maura, was apparently a poet, although little is known of her. Nelli died in 1740 in Rome.

== Sources ==
- Francesco Petrucci, Pittura di Ritratto a Roma. Il Settecento, Andreina & Valneo Budai Editori, 2010 ISBN 978-88-904944-0-6
- Fabrizio Scheggi, "Furono protagonisti", biografie di personaggi storici nel Mugello, Borgo San Lorenzo, 2019 ISBN 979-1-220-04615-2
- Bryan, Michael (1889). Walter Armstrong; Robert Edmund Graves (eds.). Dictionary of Painters and Engravers, Biographical and Critical. Vol. II L-Z. London: George Bell and Sons. pp. 205–206.
