= Pozzi =

Pozzi is an Italian word, the plural form of pozzo (which means a well), and may refer to:

- Pozzi, a località within Valeggio sul Mincio, Verona, Italy
- Pozzi (surname), an Italian surname
- Palazzo Pozzi Besana, Milan, palazzo in Milan, Italy

== See also ==
- Pozza (disambiguation)
- Pozzo (disambiguation)
