= Pozzo (surname) =

Pozzo is an Italian surname. Notable people with the surname include:

- Andrea Pozzo (1642–1709), an Italian Jesuit Brother, artist, architect and art theoretician
- Dario Pozzo, (1592–1652), Italian painter of the late-Renaissance
- Enrico Pozzo (born 1981), Italian male artistic gymnast
- Gabriel Pozzo (born 1979), Argentine rally driver
- Giampaolo Pozzo (born 1941), an Italian businessman and football club owner
  - Gino Pozzo (born 1965), son of Giampaolo Pozzo, owner of Watford F.C.
- Guido Pozzo (born 1951), a Catholic prelate and an official of the Roman Curia
- Lilo Pozzo, American chemical engineer
- Mario Da Pozzo (born 1939), Italian former football goalkeeper
- Mattia Pozzo (born 1989), Italian former professional racing cyclist
- Tomás Pozzo (born 2000), Argentine professional footballer
- Victor José Pozzo (1914–?), Argentine professional football player
- Vittorio Pozzo (1886–1968), an Italian football coach

== See also ==
- Pozzi (surname)
- Pozzo (disambiguation)
