= Agence des Balkans et d'Orient =

French news bureau

- Type: News bureau
- Headquarters: Paris, France
- Director: Henri Pozzi

Agence des Balkans et d'Orient was a Paris-based news bureau, active during World War I. Henri Pozzi was the director of the bureau.
