= Civita Castellana =

- Comune
- Comune di Civita Castellana
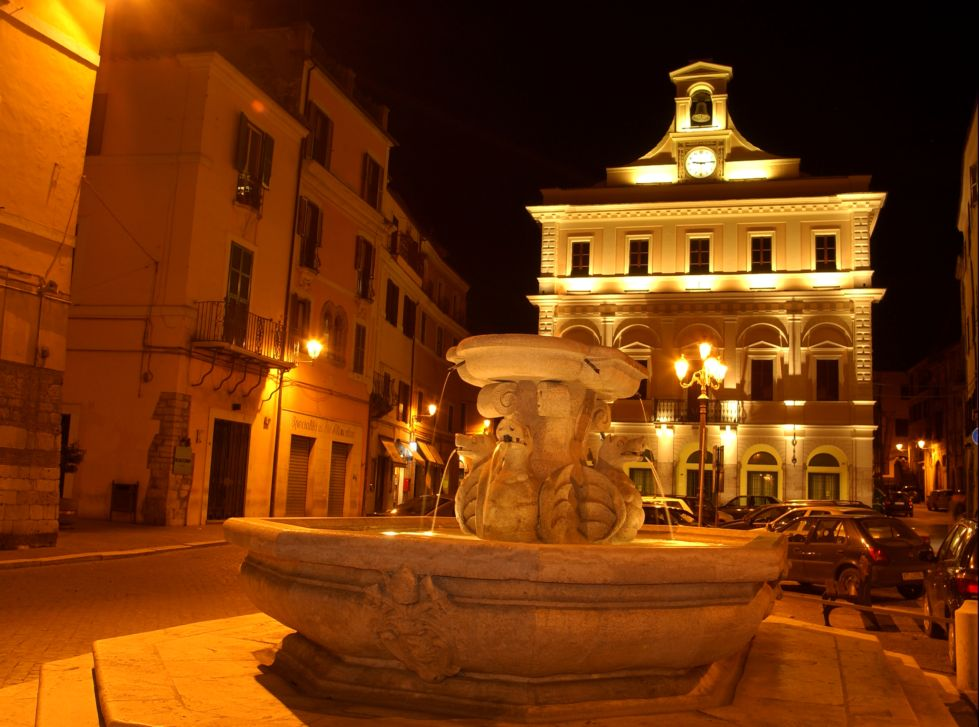
- Piazza Matteotti in Civita Castellana by night.

- Location within Italy Location within Lazio
- Coordinates: 42°17′N 12°24′E
- Country: Italy
- Region: Lazio
- Province: Viterbo (VT)
- Frazioni: Borghetto, Pian Paradiso, Sassacci

Government
  - Mayor: Franco Caprioli

Area
  - Total: 83.28 km^{2} (32.15 sq mi)
- Elevation: 145 m (476 ft)

Population (31 December 2017)
  - Total: 16,262
  - Density: 195.3/km^{2} (505.7/sq mi)
- Demonym: Civitonici
- Time zone: UTC+1 (CET)
  - Summer (DST): UTC+2 (CEST)
- Postal code: 01033
- Dialing code: 0761
- Patron saint: Sts. John and Marcianus
- Saint day: September 16
- Website: Official website

Civita Castellana is a town and comune in the province of Viterbo, 65 kilometres (40 mi) north of Rome.

Mount Soracte lies about 10 kilometres (6 mi) to the south-east.

== History ==
Civita Castellana was settled during the Iron Age by the Italic Falisci, who called it "Falerii". After the Faliscan defeat by the Romans, the Romans built a new city, about 5 kilometres (3 mi) away, "Falerii Novi."

The abandoned city was repopulated beginning in the early Middle Ages, with the new name of Civita Castellana 'City of the Castle' first mentioned in 994. In the following centuries the city was a flourishing independent commune, often disputed between the Pope and the Holy Roman Empire. Captured by Pope Paschal II at the beginning of the 12th century, the city was given as a fief to the Savelli by Gregory XIV.

Sixtus IV assigned the city to Cardinal Rodrigo Borgia, the future Pope Alexander VI, who started the construction of the Rocca ("Castle"), which was completed under Julius II.

Civita Castellana became an important road hub with the connection to the Via Flaminia (1606) and the construction of Ponte Clementino sometime after the Battle of Civita Castellana, a French Army victory against a Neapolitan Army here on December 5, 1798 while this community was still part of the 1798–1799 Roman Republic after the fall of the 754–1798 Papal States but before the return of the 1799–1809 Papal States.

== Main sights ==
=== Churches ===
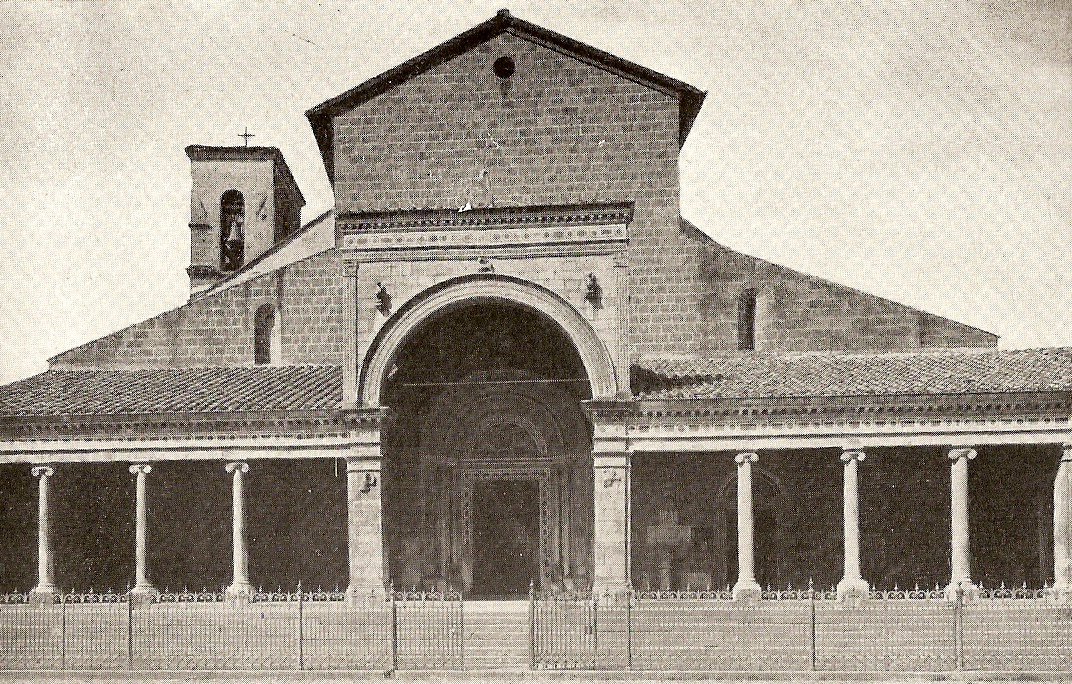
The façade of the Cathedral of Civita Castellana

- Santa Maria Maggiore: the town's cathedral, featuring a fine Cosmatesque portico erected in 1210 by Laurentius Romanus, his son Jacobus and grandson Cosmas, with ancient columns and mosaic decorations. The interior was modernized in the 18th century but retains fragments of Cosmatesque ornamentation. The high altar is made from a Paleo-Christian sarcophagus of the 3rd or 4th century, and the ancient crypt and old sacristy contain examples of central Italian medieval art.
- Santa Chiara: church with a Renaissance portal dating from 1529.
- Santa Maria del Carmine: church with a small 12th-century belltower incorporating ancient Roman spolia.
- San Francesco: church rebuilt in the 18th century.

=== Fortifications ===
- Rocca: the citadel erected by Pope Alexander VI to designs by Antonio da Sangallo the Elder, later enlarged by Julius II and Leo X.
- Castle of Paterno (ruins): the site where Emperor Otto III died on 23 January 1002.

=== Bridges ===
- Ponte Clementino: the bridge by which the town is approached, dating to the 18th century.

=== Museums ===
- National Museum of the Faliscan Countryside: houses finds from ancient Falerii and the surrounding area.

== People ==
- Scalimoli

== Sources ==
- Boscolo, Silvia, Luca Creti, Consuelo Mastelloni (1993) Il pavimento cosmatesco della Cattedrale di Civita Castellana. Biblioteca e società 23(1-2).
- De Lucia Brolli, Maria Anna, and Jacopo Tabolli. 2013. "The Faliscans and the Etruscans." In The Etruscan World, edited by Jean MacIntosh Turfa, 259–80. Abingdon: Routledge.
- Tabolli, Jacopo, and Jean MacIntosh Turfa. 2014. "Discovered Anew: A Faliscan Tomb-Group from Falerii-Celle in Philadelphia." Etruscan Studies 17(1): 28–62.
