= Pietro Campana =

Italian engraver (1727–1765)

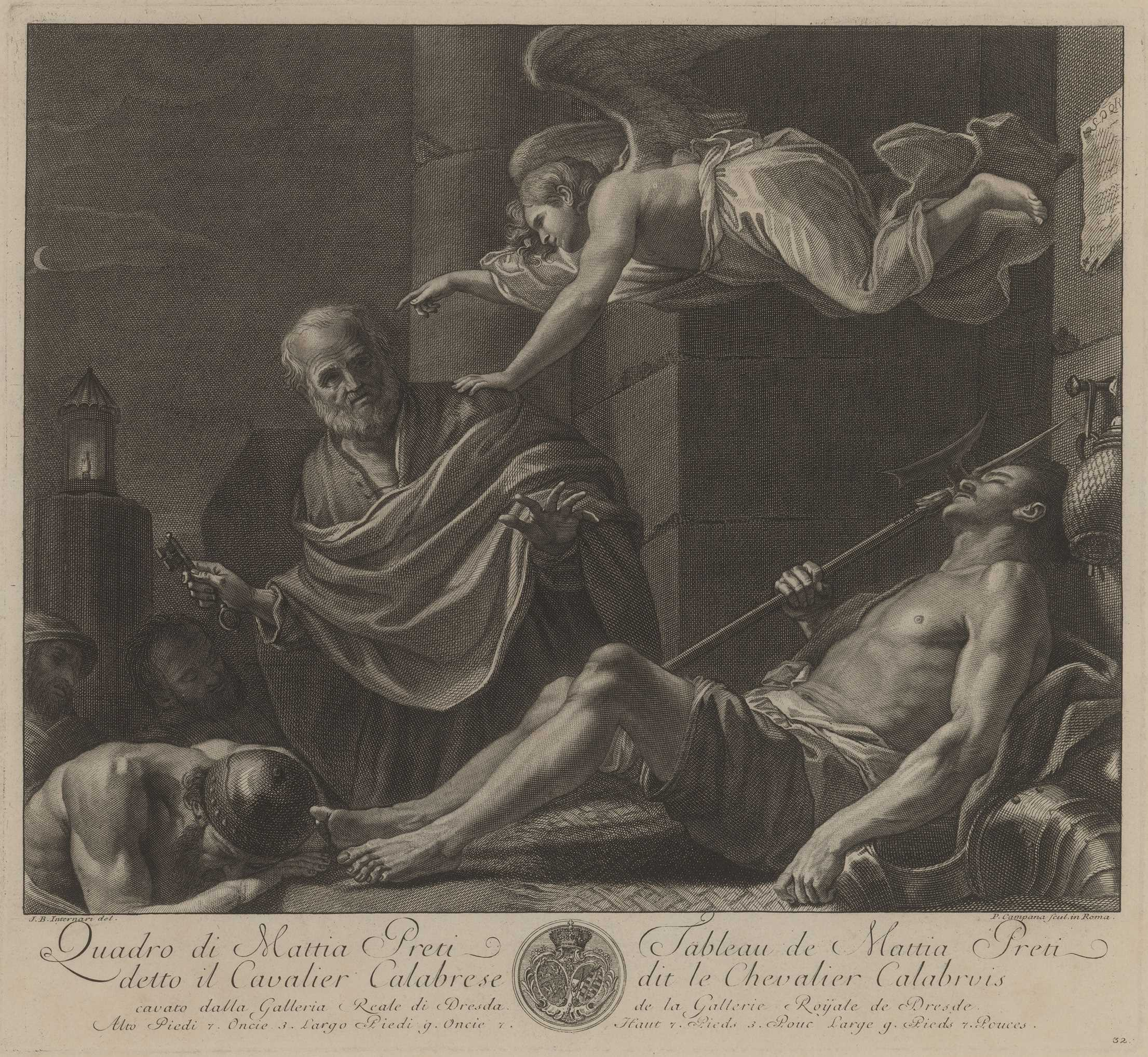
Pietro Campana engraving of The Release of Peter from Prison, after painting by Mattia Preti, Gemäldegalerie Alte Meister, 1750

Pietro Campana (1727–1765) was an Italian engraver.

He was born at Soriano Calabro in Calabria, Kingdom of Naples. He trained with Rocco Pozzi, and lived the greater part of his life at Rome and Venice. He engraved the following prints: St. Francis of Paola after Sebastiano Conca, Portrait of Pietro da Cortona; a picture in the St. Peter delivered from Prison after Mattia Preti; Portrait of Bernardino Barbatelli called Poccetti. He engraved a map of Rome (1748) for Giovanni Battista Nolli.

== Bibliography ==
- Bryan, Michael (1886). Robert Edmund Graves (ed.). Dictionary of Painters and Engravers, Biographical and Critical. Vol. I: A-K. London: George Bell and Sons. p. 221.
