= Ambra Pozzi =

Italian American Physician and Professor

Ambra A. Pozzi
- Born: Brescia
- Education: University of Milan; University of Florence
- Scientific career
- Workplaces: Scripps Research; Vanderbilt University Medical Center

Ambra A. Pozzi is an Italian American physician who is a professor of nephrology in the Vanderbilt University Medical Center. She works on matrix biology and matrix receptor biology. In 2022, she was appointed President Elect of the American Society for Matrix Biology.

== Early life and education ==
Pozzi was born in Brescia, Lombardy, Italy. She earned her master's degree at the University of Milan, where she majored in biochemistry. She attended the University of Florence for her doctoral research. Her research focused on experimental pathology. Her mentor encouraged her to study abroad, and she eventually moved to the United States. She did her postdoctoral research at the Scripps Research institute.

== Research and career ==
In 2000, Pozzi joined Vanderbilt University where she focuses on matrix biology. She has two main research focuses: kidney fibrosis and endothelial cell functions. Fibrosis is the excessive deposition of extracellular matrix components (i.e. collagen) along critical nephrons (renal tubules). Fibrosis is an irreversible process, and people who get it require a kidney transplant. Pozzi showed that the cell surface receptor DDR1 is involved with the inflammation and fibrosis that can cause kidney failure.

Pozzi is on the editorial board of Matrix Biology, and has held various leadership positions within the American Society for Matrix Biology. In 2022, she became President Elect of the society.

== Selected publications ==
- Ambra Pozzi; Peter Yurchenco; Renato V Iozzo (2016). "The nature and biology of basement membranes". Matrix Biology. 57–58: 1–11. doi:10.1016/j.matbio.2016.12.009. PMC 5387862. PMID 28040522. Wikidata Q39063783.
- Dana M Brantley; Nikki Cheng; Erin J Thompson; et al. (2002). "Soluble Eph A receptors inhibit tumor angiogenesis and progression in vivo". Oncogene. 21 (46): 7011–7026. doi:10.1038/sj.onc.1205679. PMID 12370823. Wikidata Q44172489.
- Monica Red Brewer; Sung Hee Choi; Diego Alvarado; Katarina Moravcevic; Ambra Pozzi; Mark A Lemmon; Graham Carpenter (2009). "The Juxtamembrane Region of the EGF Receptor Functions as an Activation Domain". Molecular Cell. 34 (6): 641–51. doi:10.1016/j.molcel.2009.04.034. PMC 2719887. PMID 19560417. Wikidata Q27646344.
