= San Francesco, Civita Castellana =

Church in Civita Castellana, Italy

Coordinates: 42.289211°N 12.412467°E

San Francesco, once known as San Pietro is a Roman Catholic located in the town of Civita Castellana, province of Viterbo, region of Lazio, Italy.

== History ==
A church at the site, was erected in the 13th-century, but the present church arrived in its present form, after two reconstructions; the latest in the 18th-century. In the past, the church was adjacent to a Franciscan convent, and the wooden choir stalls for the friars are still evident in the apse of the church. The church has six side altars. Among the works are a depiction of San Bernardino of Siena by Sano di Pietro in the first altar on the left; and an Adoration of the Christ Child by Antoniazzo Romano in the second altar on the right. The main tabernacle is attributed to Agostino di Duccio and it shelters a 1531 altarpiece.
