= Michel-Ange de La Chausse =

French antiquarian and diplomat

Engraved portrait by Niccolò Billy based on a lost painting by Carlo Maratta

Michel-Ange de La Chausse (also known by the Latinized name Michael Angelus Causeus and the Italian form Michaelangelo Causeo; Paris, 1660 – Rome, 21 June 1724) was a French antiquarian and diplomat who spent the greater part of his life in Italy.

== Life ==
Michel-Ange de La Chausse was born in Paris in 1660. Little is known about La his childhood and education. He first emerges clearly in the historical record toward the end of the 17th century, when he settled in Rome to devote himself entirely to his antiquarian studies. Following the death of Claude Voiret, the French consul to the Papal States, in 1705, La Chausse succeeded him in the role. The primary representative – serving as ambassador and, from 1706, holding the rank of French minister – was Joseph-Emmanuel de La Trémoille. In 1708, La Chausse was appointed a Knight of the Order of Saint Lazarus. To better support the French ambassadors and ministers at the Holy See, a specific position – "Custodian of the Consular Archives" – was created for La Chausse by official patent in 1711. In this capacity, he was tasked with procuring documents and information to assist French officials in their dealings with the Roman Curia. Furthermore, he helped acquire and ship artworks and artifacts for the royal collections of coins, inscriptions, and sculptures, while also providing support to other officials involved in these endeavors. La Chausse himself had assembled a substantial collection comprising books, manuscripts, archaeological artifacts, and other works of art. To ensure the collection would not be dispersed after his death, he bequeathed it to the Parisian antiquarian and collector Pierre Crozat. La Chausse maintained an extensive correspondence with several scholars of his era, including Joachim Legrand, Claude Nicaise, and Pierre-Joseph de Grainville. In 1715 he became a corresponding member of the Académie des Inscriptions et Belles-Lettres. La Chausse died in Rome on 21 June 1724.

== Works ==
La Chausse published three antiquarian works of considerable significance. The first was Romanum Museum (1690), in which he describes ancient artefacts that had not been published before, drawn from private and non-public collections, as well as his own. This folio-sized volume achieved widespread circulation. New enlarged editions were published in 1707 and 1746 and French translation appeared in 1706. Many of the illustrations were adopted by Johann Georg Graevius for his Thesaurus Antiquitatum Romanarum (12 volumes, 1694–1699). La Chausse regarded engraved gems as the most important art form, and consequently dedicated a separate publication to his own collection of gems. This publication, in the form of a book of plates, was released in 1700 and featured 200 engravings. The collection reflects the breadth of La Chausse's interests, though a distinct preference for depictions of animals and symbols is evident. Finally, he translated Giovanni Pietro Bellori and Pietro Santi Bartoli's Le pitture antiche del sepolcro de Nasonii nella Via Flaminia into Latin and significantly expanded upon the original text. This book focuses on Roman wall painting, specifically the Tomb of the Nasonii, which was discovered in 1674 along the Via Flaminia. It featured copperplate engravings by Francesco Bartoli and was published posthumously in 1738 as a large-format folio edition. La Chausse also wrote a treatise on numismatics and provided accounts in his letters regarding the remains of the Column of Antoninus Pius, which was discovered in 1703.

== Works (selection) ==
Engraved title page of Michel Ange de La Chausse's Le grand Cabinet Romain, 1706

- Romanum museum sive thesaurus eruditae antiquitatis... Joannis Jacobi Komarek, Rom 1690 (online).
  - Michaelis Angeli Causei de la Chausse Romanum Museum Sive Thesaurus Eruditae Antiquitatis. In Quo Gemmae, Idola, Insignia Sacerdotalia, Instrumenta sacrificijs, inservientia, Lucernae, Vasa, Bullae, Armillae, Fibulae, Claves, Annulli, Tesserae, Styli, Strigiles, Gutti, Phialae lacrymatoriae, vota, Signa Militaria, Marmora &c. Francesco Chracas, Rome, 1707 (online).
  - French translation: Le grand cabinet romain ou recueil d’antiquitez romaines, qui consistent en bas-reliefs, statues des dieux et des hommes, instruments sacerdotaux, lampes, urnes, seaux, brasselets, clefs, anneaux, et phioles lacrimales, que l’on trouve à Rome. Honoré & Chastelain, Amsterdam, 1706 (online).
- Le gemme antiche figurate. Joannis Jacobi Komarek, Rome, 1700 (Digitalisat).
  - 2. Auflage: Raccolta di gemme antiche figurate incisa da Pietro Santi Bartoli ed illustrate da Michelangelo Causeo de la Chausse. Rome, 1805 (Vol. 1, Vol. 2).
- Aureus Constantini Augusti nummus de urbe, devicto ab exercitu Gallicano Maxentio, liberata explicatus. Francesco Chracas, Rome, 1703 (online).
- Lettera del signor Michelagnolo de la Chausse indirizzata al signor N.N. in cui si fa parola della colonna, nuovamente trovata in Roma nel Campo Marzo ed eretta gia per l’apoteosi di Antonino Pio. Naples, 1704 (online).
- Seconda lettera del signor Michelagnolo de la Chausse indirizzata al signor N.N. circa la colonna dell’apoteosi di Antonino Pio scoperta in Roma nel Campo Marzo, in risposta di alcune osservazioni pubblicate nel Giornale di Trevoux del mese di settembre 1704. Naples, 1705 (online).
- Le pitture antiche delle grotte di Roma, e del sepolcro de’ Nasoni. Disegnate, & intagliate alla similitudine degli antichi originali da Pietro Santi Bartoli, e Francesco Bartoli, suo figliuolo, descritte, et illustrate da Gio: Pietro Bellori, e Michelangelo Causei dela Chausse. Rome, 1706 (online).
  - erweiterte lateinische Ausgabe: Picturae Antiquae Cryptarum Romanarum et Sepulchri Nasonum. Antonio de Rubeis, Rome, 1738 (online).

== Bibliography ==
- Georges Brunel: Michel-Ange de la Chausse. In: Les fondations nationales dans la Rome pontificale. Actes du colloque de Rome (16–19 mai 1978). Rome, 1981, pp. 723–747 (online).
- Zambon, Alessia (2013). "Michel-Ange de La Chausse". Brill's New Pauly. Supplements I Online – Volume 6. doi:10.1163/2214-8647_bnps6_COM_00394.
