= Tancredi Pozzi =

Italian sculptor

Tancredi Pozzi (Milan, 1864- Turin, 1924) was an Italian sculptor.

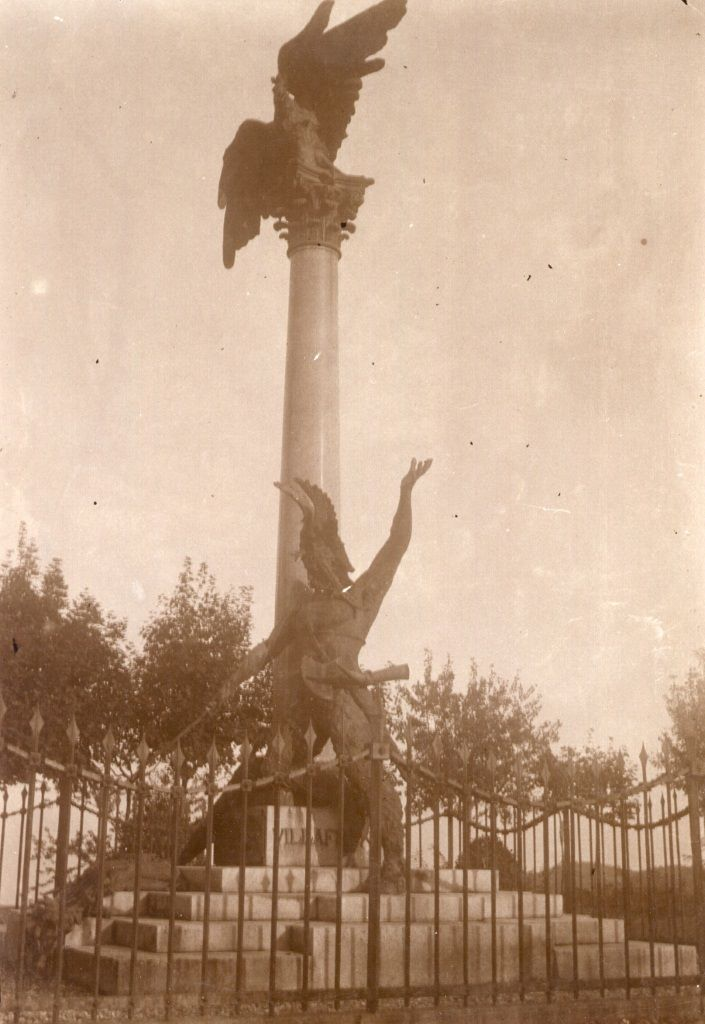
Monument to king Umberto I, Superga

== Biography ==
Pozzi studied at the Accademia Albertina, under Giuseppe Dini. He completed many bas reliefs, funereal monuments, and monumental commemorations. He also completed a number of portrait busts. At the 1884 Turin exhibition, he exhibited a life-size stucco statue titled: Sarà tempesta?. At the 1887 National Exhibition of Fine Arts in Venice, he exhibited Regata vinta. Other works include Rematore, Popolano, and Figurina muliebre. In 1888 at Bologna, he exhibited a stucco statue of a horse titled Tafani molesti and a small bronze equestrian group titled Tancredi in Love. He was knighted by the King. These works underscore his predilection for statues of vigorous and active horses and equestrian groups, also including Ettore Fieramosca, Kamir, Arduino d'Ivrea, Clelia Romana, Rez, Populus, Fetontesul Po, and Autari. Among his funereal monuments are that to his family in the Camposanto of Turin. Among his major monumental works are: his Monument to King Umberto I (1902) standing in the piazza in front of the Basilica of Superga and his bronze Monument to Giuseppe Garibaldi (1904), leaning on a rock, located in Porto Maurizio (Imperia) in Liguria Finally, he sculpted the Monument to Angelo Beccaria, in the Garden of what was the Istituto dei Rachitici. He also completed a monumental fountain in Turin.
