= Matrix Biology (journal) =

- Discipline: Biology
- Language: English
- Edited by: Bjorn Olsen

Publication details
- Former name(s): Matrix: Collagen and Related Research, Collagen and Related Research
- History: 1981–present
- Publisher: Elsevier
- Frequency: 8/year
- Impact factor: 4.6 (2024)

Standard abbreviations
- ISO 4: Matrix Biol.

Indexing
- CODEN: MTBOEC
- ISSN: 0945-053X (print); 1569-1802 (web)
- LCCN: sn94043255
- OCLC no.: 30091752

Links
- Journal homepage; Online access

Matrix Biology is a peer-reviewed scientific journal in the field of matrix biology. The journal is published 8 times per year by Elsevier. The journal was established in 1981 as Collagen and Related Research and renamed to Matrix: Collagen and Related Research in 1988, before obtaining its current name in 1994. It is an official journal of the American Society for Matrix Biology and the International Society for Matrix Biology. The current editor-in-chief is Renato V. Iozzo (Thomas Jefferson University).

== Abstracting and indexing ==
Matrix Biology is abstracted and indexed in BIOBASE, Biochemistry and Biophysics Citation Index, Biological & Agricultural Index, Biological Abstracts, BIOSIS Previews, Chemical Abstracts Service, Current Advances in Ecological and Environmental Sciences, Current Awareness in Biological Sciences, Current Contents, EMBASE, EMBiology, Genetics Abstracts, MEDLINE, Science Citation Index, and Scopus. According to the Journal Citation Reports, the journal has a 2024 impact factor of 4.6.
