= Niccolò Billy =

Italian engraver of French origins

- Engraved portrait of Hans Holbein the Younger
- Born: c. 1734; Rome, Papal States
- Died: 1786
- Known for: Engraving
- Movement: Neoclassicism

Niccolò Billy (also known as Nicola Billy the Younger; c. 1734 – 1786) was an Italian engraver of French origins, mainly active in Rome and Naples.

== Life and work ==
Niccolò Billy was born in Rome, the son of a copper engraver and print dealer of French origin. At the beginning of his career, he worked alongside his brother Antonio Billy. Together, they engraved a number of plates based on works by Old Masters, chiefly portraits and historical scenes. His engravings of Old Master paintings include St. Philip Neri kneeling before the Virgin, after Sebastiano Conca; The Holy Family, after Annibale Carracci; St. Michael the Archangel, after Pietro da Cortona (1689); The Flight into Egypt, after Guido Reni; and the self-portraits of Federico Zuccari, Hans Holbein, Pier Leone Ghezzi, and Giovanni Maria Morandi.

Billy was active within the Roman milieu of the Calcografia Camerale, a papal printing and publishing institution founded in 1738 by Pope Clement XII. Between 1741 and 1755, he produced engravings for Giovanni Gaetano Bottari's Museo Capitolino, a multi-volume illustrated catalog of the ancient artefacts and sculptures of the Capitoline Museums in Rome. Billy also engraved plates for Antonio Francesco Gori's archaeological work Museum Florentinum (1752–1766), and furnished drawings for vignettes prepared by Francesco Zucchi to illustrate the Italian translation of Milton's Paradise Lost, published in Venice in 1740.

In 1747 Charles VII of Naples appointed him to the prestigious Accademia Ercolanese. Alongside artists like Giovanni Elia Morghen and Carlo Nolli, Billy was tasked with creating high-quality copperplate engravings of the ancient Roman frescoes and artifacts freshly unearthed at Pompeii and Herculaneum. Billy collaborated on the first volume of the Prodromo delle antichità di Ercolano by Antonio Ottavio Bayardi, published in Naples in 1752, on which Rocco Pozzi and Camillo Paderni also worked. Between 1757 and 1792, he contributed several plates to the landmark multivolume catalog of the findings from the ruins of Herculaneum, Le Antichità di Ercolano Esposte.

== Gallery ==
St. Anthony of Padua with Child Jesus

St. Angelo Paoli

St. Philip Neri kneeling before the Virgin, after Sebastiano Conca

Saint Gallicanus attending to the poor

Bust of Apollo, engraved by Billy after a drawing by Giovanni Domenico Campiglia for Bottari's Museo Capitolino, Vol. III, 1755

Orpheus Eurydice, one of the plates engraved by Blly for Le Antichità di Ercolano Esposte

A wall painting unhearted at Hercolaneum engraved by Blly for Le Antichità di Ercolano Esposte

Portrait of Carlo Antonio Calvi, engraved by Billy after a drawing by Campiglia

Portrait of Michel-Ange de La Chausse, after Carlo Maratta
