= Civita Castellana Cathedral =

Cathedral in Lazio, Italy

Coordinates: 42°17′14.5″N 12°24′38.2″E

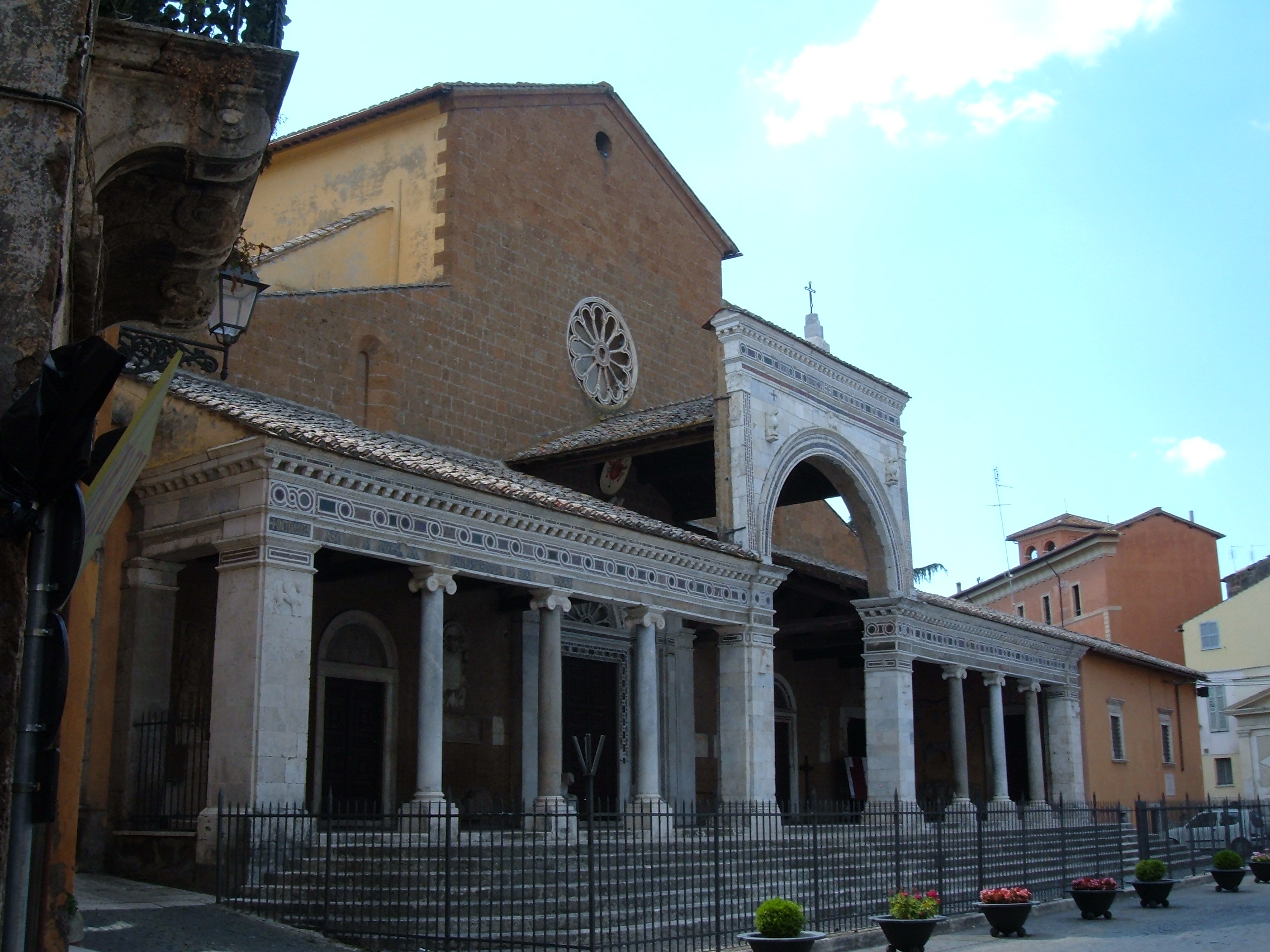
Civita Castellana Cathedral

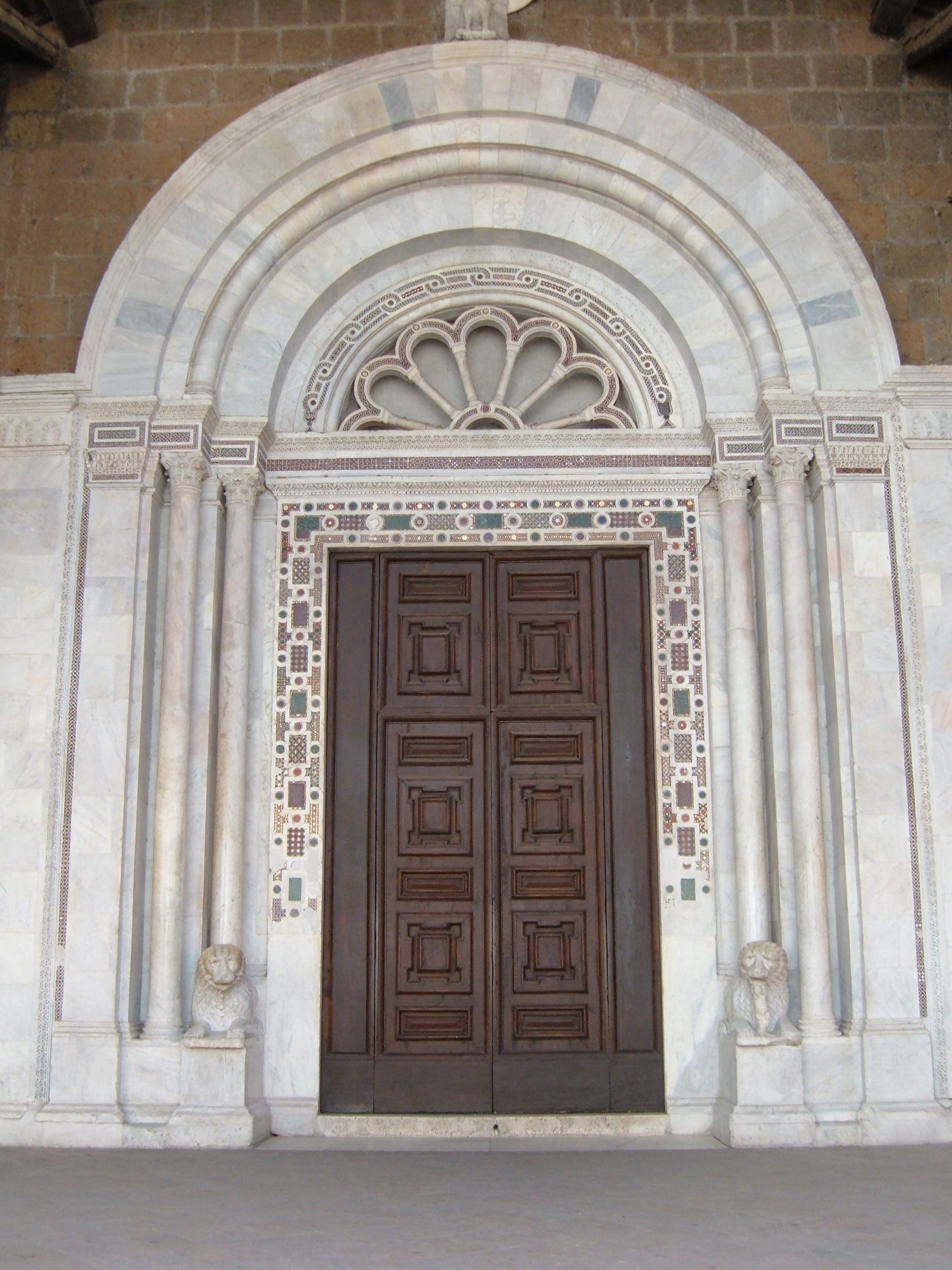
Central gate

Civita Castellana Cathedral (Italian: Cattedrale di Santa Maria Maggiore or Santa Maria di Pozzano) is the cathedral of Civita Castellana, in central Italy. It is the episcopal seat of the Bishop of Civita Castellana.

== History ==
The edifice was built from around 1185, over a pre-existing church, and was completed with the construction of the portico in 1210. The latter saw the intervention of the Roman Cosmati family of architects and marble workers.

After centuries of decay, in the 18th century the church was totally restored and the interior was renovated in Baroque style. The two aisles were turned into side chapels, communicating with each other, thus keeping only a single nave. A plaque on the building's exterior commemorates Wolfgang Amadeus Mozart's sojourn in Civita Castellana on 17 July 1770: he also played the cathedral's organ at Mass of that day, a Sunday.

== Description ==
=== Exterior ===
The church is preceded by a 13th-century portico, in whose architrave was once a mosaic frieze with gilded letters. Today only a few fragments of the latter can be seen. Two central piers support a rounded arch, in which is the writing "Gloria in excelsis Deo...", while another inscription at the top contains the name of the portico's designer, "IACOBUS CIVIS ROMANUS" ("James, citizen of Rome") and the date of execution (1210). The central and final piers of the portico are decorated with the marble symbols of the Four Evangelists, while in the middle of the arch is a lamb, symbolizing Jesus Christ.

The cathedral has three entrance gates. The central one is sided by four Corinthian columns, two of which stand on marble lions. Under the right lion is the representation of a child, a symbol of the faithful entering the church. The lunettes over the side gates have Cosmatesque mosaic decorations; the right lunette has also a representation of "Christ blessing ".

The cathedral has a Romanesque bell tower.

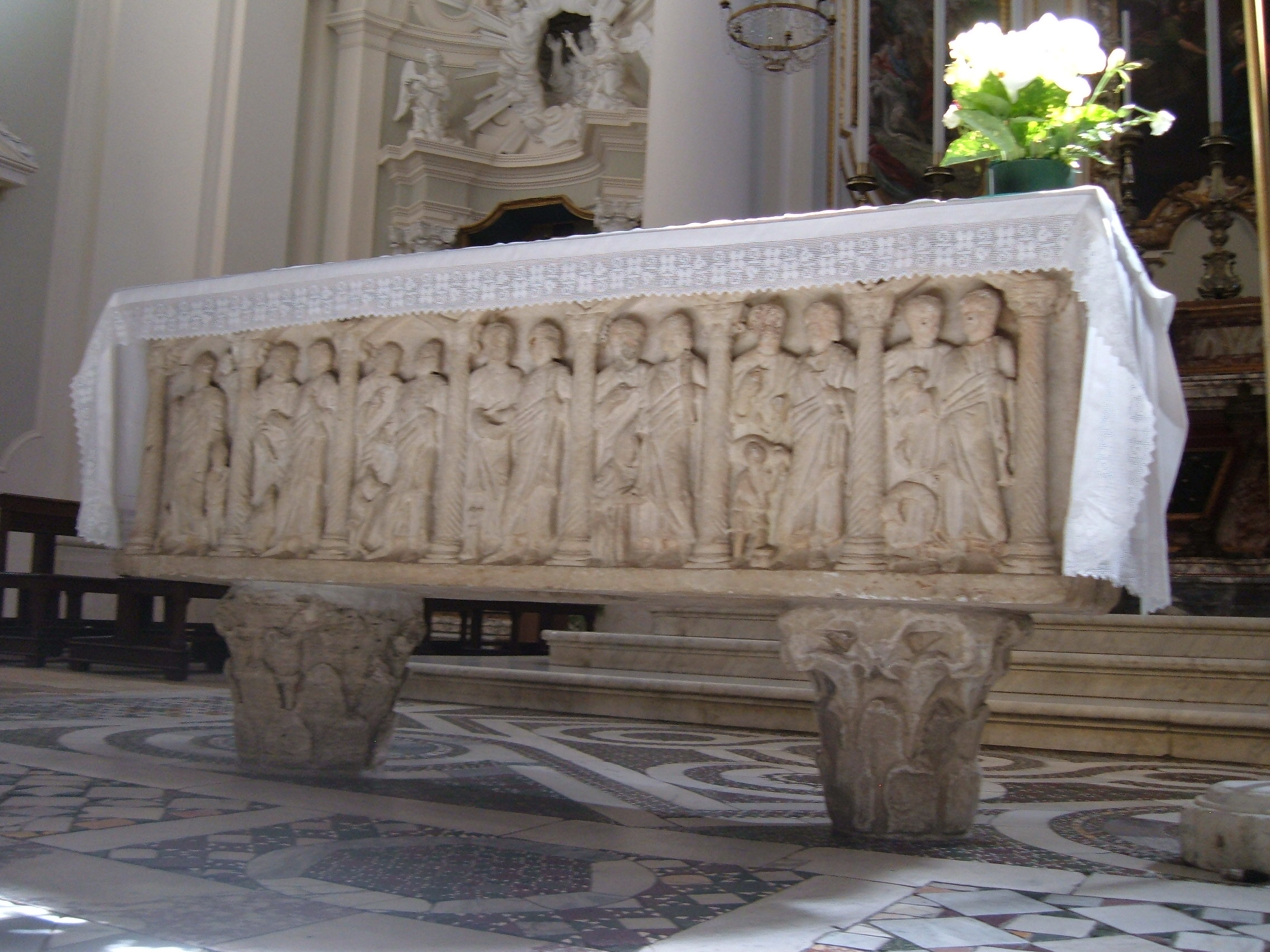
The high altar

=== Interior ===
The church has a single nave, with side chapels which communicate with each other. The nave ends in a transept which precedes the raised sanctuary, under which is the crypt. In the transept's arms are two monumental Baroque altars: the right one is dedicated to the Madonna of the Light, and incorporates an 11th-century fresco; the left-hand altar is dedicated to the Madonna of the Rosary, and has a 16th-century canvas surrounded by 15 panels, depicting the mystery of the rosary.

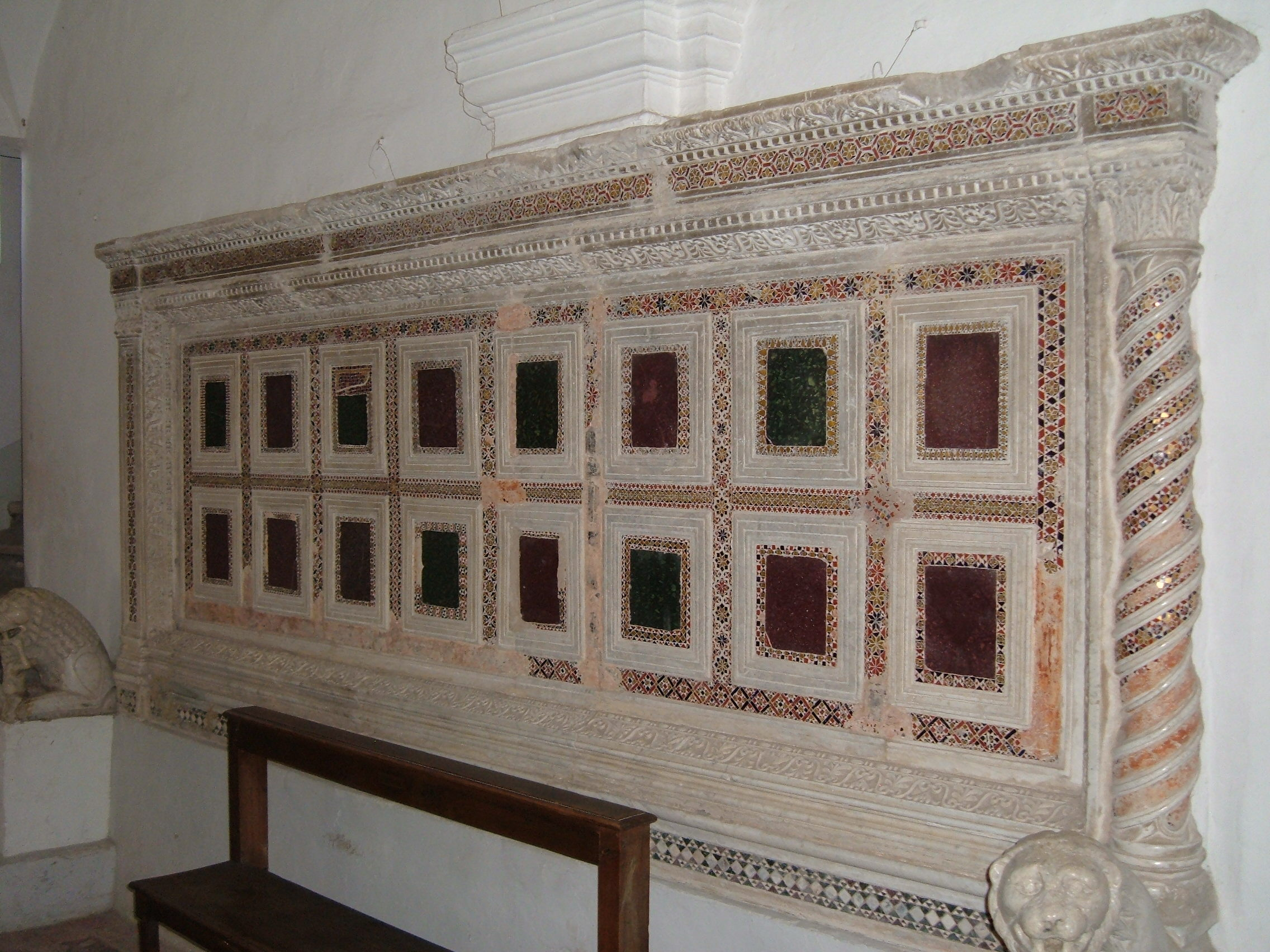
One of the two 13th century parapets walled in the crypt

The high altar, located in the sanctuary or presbytery is one of the most precious works of art in the church. It consists of a 4th-century Roman-Palaeochristian sarcophagus with seven niches which are decorated by biblical episodes. At the end of the presbytery, over the wooden choir, is a canvas by Pietro Nelli (Annunciation), while at the sides are two frescoes of the Resurrection of John and the Martyrdom of Saints John and Marcianus.

A door on the left side of the presbytery leads to the oratory of the Heart of the Virgin Mary, built as a chapel in the 14th century. This houses important medieval works including:

- several 12th-century frescoes depicting a Madonna with Saints, an Angel and other Saints
- the front section of an early Middle Ages (9th-century) sarcophagus with representations of hunting scenes
- two Cosmatesque parapets flanked by two lions, originally in the cathedral's presbytery, dated to c. 1231-1240.

Under the presbytery is the crypt, with cross-vaults, dating to the 12th century but renewed later. It houses two Renaissance marble ciboria, originally in the presbytery but walled here during the 18th-century renovation works.

== Sources ==
- Rossi, P. (1986). Civita Castellana e le chiese medievali del suo territorio. Rome.
- Cardinali, A. (1935). Cenni storici della chiesa cattedrale di Civita Castellana. Rome.
