= Rocco Pozzi =

Italian engraver (1701–1774)

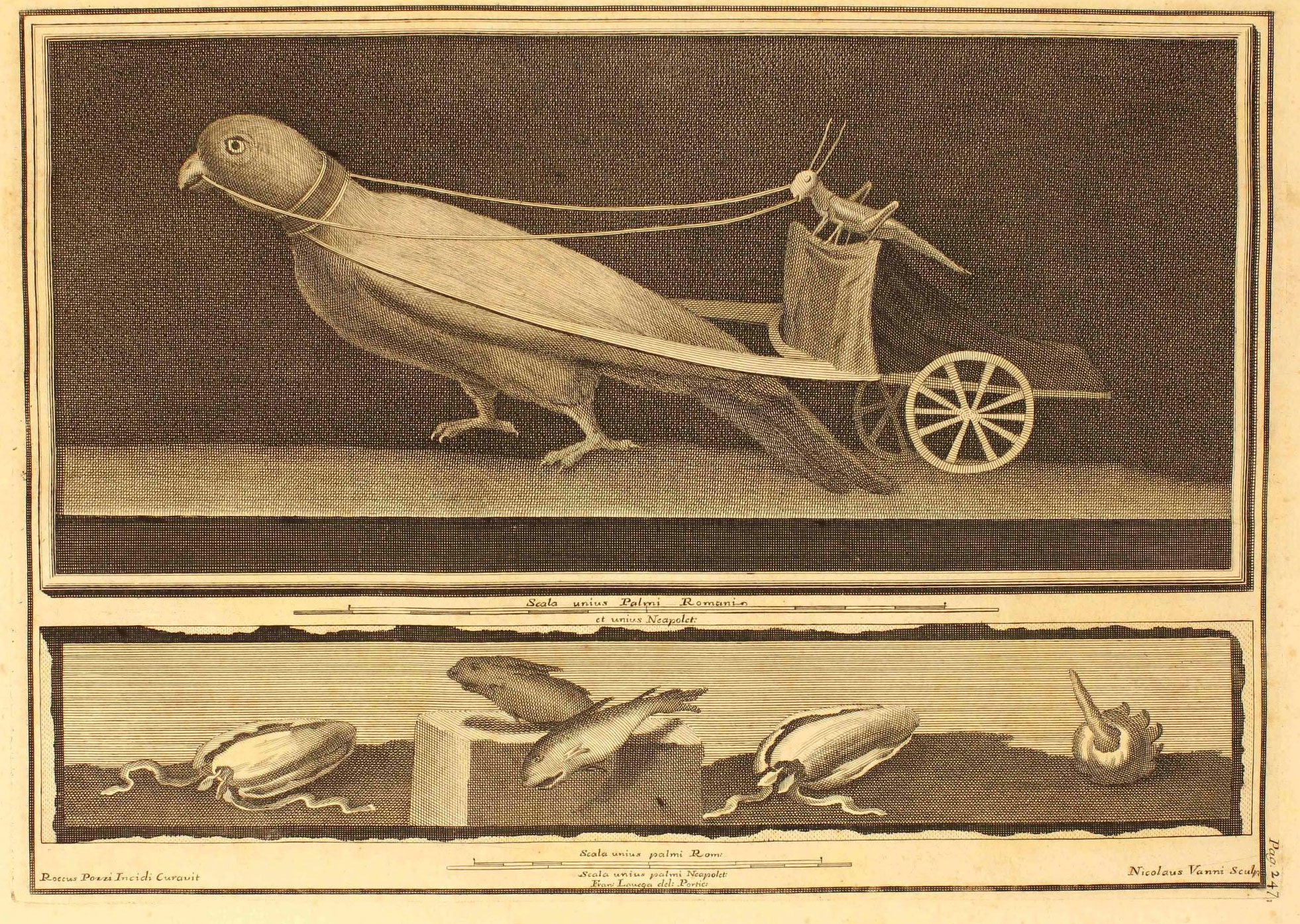
Rocco Pozzi sketch ca. 1757

Rocco Pozzi (died c. 1780), was an Italian painter and engraver of the Baroque period, active around 1750.

== Biography ==
Rocco Pozzi was the son of Giovanni Battista Pozzi and the brother of Stefano Pozzi. He studied in Rome under Giovanni Girolamo Frezza. Pozzi specialized in reproducing antiquities. He collaborated on Antonio Francesco Gori's major publication Museum Florentinum (1731–1766), a comprehensive visual record of the Medici archaeological collections. In 1747, Pozzi was hired by king Charles VII of Naples, and tasked, alongside artists like Giovanni Elia Morghen and Niccolò Billy, with creating high-quality copperplate engravings of the ancient Roman frescoes and artifacts freshly unearthed at Pompeii and Herculaneum. Pozzi executed prints for Ottavio Antonio Bayardi's Le pitture antiche d'Ercolano (1757) and for Le Antichità di Ercolano Esposte, published in Naples between 1757 and 1792. He became court engraver to King Charles VII of Naples, and died in Naples around 1780. Pietro Campana was one of his disciples.

== See also ==
- Camillo Paderni

== Bibliography ==
- Bryan, Michael (1889). Walter Armstrong; Robert Edmund Graves (eds.). Dictionary of Painters and Engravers, Biographical and Critical. Vol. II L-Z. London: George Bell and Sons. p. 317.
- Vázquez Gestal, Pablo (2019). "Printing Antiquities: Herculaneum and the cultural politics of the Two Sicilies". In K.D.S. Lapatin (ed.). Buried By Vesuvius: The Villa dei Papiri in Herculaneum. Los Angeles: Getty Publications. pp. 37–45. ISBN 978-1606065921.
