= Pozzo =

Pozzo may refer to:

- Pozzo (surname), Italian surname
- Pozzo (Waiting for Godot), a character from the play Waiting for Godot
- Pozzo d'Adda, comune in the Province of Milan in the Italian region Lombardy
- Pozzo Ardizzi, Italian surname and family
- Pozzo, a frazione of Mulazzo, Massa-Carrara, Tuscany, Italy
