= Henri Pozzi =

French politician, diplomat, writer (1879–1946)

Henri Pozzi (1879–1946) was a French lawyer, politician, diplomat and author who worked for the French and British secret services in the Balkans and Eastern Europe.

Pozzi was born in Bergerac. His father was French and his mother was English. During World War I, he directed Agence des Balkans et d'Orient, a Paris-based news bureau. In 1919–1921, Pozzi was the mayor of Soisy-sous-Montmorency.

== Books ==
In 1933, Henri Pozzi wrote La Guerre revient... (published in English as Black Hand Over Europe) in which he surveys the political situation in Kingdom of Yugoslavia between the two World Wars, and shows how the Yugoslav state was created for the simple purpose of implementing Serbian domination over the non-Serb nations within Yugoslavia. In the book, especially harsh were the methods implemented against the Bulgarian population in Vardar Banovina. Pozzi also attempted to warn of the potential for large scale conflict in Europe. The book was prohibited in the states of Little Entente.

Henri Pozzi also wrote Les Coupables (1935) and La Bataille Contre la Paix (1939).
