= Stefano Pozzi =

Italian painter (1699–1768)

- Saint John the Evangelist, Thirlestane Castle
- Born: 9 November 1699; Rome, Papal States
- Died: 11 June 1768 (aged 68); Rome, Papal States
- Education: Andrea Procaccini; Agostino Masucci
- Known for: Painting
- Movement: Baroque

Stefano Pozzi (9 November 1699 – 11 June 1768) was an Italian painter, designer, draughtsman, and decorator whose career was spent largely in Rome.

== Life ==
Stefano Pozzi, Antiochus Yearning for Stratonice, Art Institute of Chicago

Born in Rome, he was one of four artist sons of his father, an innkeeper: Rocco (1701–74) was an engraver, with whom Stefano worked on occasion; Andrea (1718–69), a carver in ivory; Giuseppe (1723–65) was also a painter. Stefano Pozzi studied in the ateliers of the two best followers of Carlo Maratta, that of Andrea Procaccini, who departed for Spain in 1720, and then Agostino Masucci. In 1732, Stefano was admitted to the Pontifical Academy of Fine Arts and Letters of the Virtuosi al Pantheon and became its Regent in 1739. In 1736, he was admitted to the Accademia di San Luca, the artist guild in Rome.

Pozzi worked primarily for Roman churches; for example, he painted a Blessed Niccolò Albergati for a chapel of the Basilica of Santa Maria Maggiore; eight ovals between the windows (c. 1736) for the church of San Silvestro al Quirinale (Titi 1763); the refectory of the Church of San Gregorio Nazianzeno; a Death of St Joseph (1742) for the third chapel of the Church of Santissimo Nome di Maria (Titi 1763). He frescoed a Sant'Apollinare in Gloria in the vault of the church of Sant'Apollinare alle Terme, which was rebuilt by Ferdinando Fuga and rededicated in 1748. Among the flock of artists who worked on the Chapel of Pope Sixtus V, he contributed figures of angels in the spandrels of arches (Titi 1763).

In 1744, he was summoned to Naples by Cardinal Giuseppe Spinelli to decorate the apse of the Cathedral restored by Paolo Posi; for the right wall, he painted the large oil of SS Januarius and Agrippino Driving out the Saracens (still in place) and on the vault, a fresco of a choir of Angels (still in place).

In subsequent commissions, he worked with the architect Luigi Vanvitelli: in 1744, he produced two paintings for the Montemorcino monastery that Vanvitelli had built for the Olivetans at Perugia (now the Palazzo dell’ Università): an Annunciation (still in place) and the Blessed Bernardino Tolomei among the Plague-stricken (Santa Francesca Romana in Rome). In Perugia he frescoed the sacristy of the Church of il Gesù.

For the library that Vanvitelli designed for Palazzo Sciarra in Rome, Pozzi painted allegories of the Signs of the Zodiac, and in Palazzo Doria-Pamphilj he decorated the Galleria degli Specchi.

Architects Vincenzo Brenna, Giacomo Quarenghi and painter Antonio Cavallucci trained in classic painting at Pozzi's workshop. Pozzi died in Rome in 1768, aged 68. The picture Madonna surrounded by angels and clouds has been recently attributed to him by Dr. Stella Rudolph.
