= Giovanni Battista Pozzi =

Italian painter

Giovanni Battista Pozzi was an Italian painter, born at Milan towards the end of the 17th century. He decorated a large number of buildings in the Piedmont, including San Cristoforo at Vercelli.

A pupil of Raffaellino da Reggio. He painted a Christ of the Angels for the church of the Gesu, Rome.
