= St. Patrick Church (Pittsburgh) =

Historic Catholic parish in Pittsburgh, Pennsylvania

Coordinates: 40°26′59″N 79°59′06″W

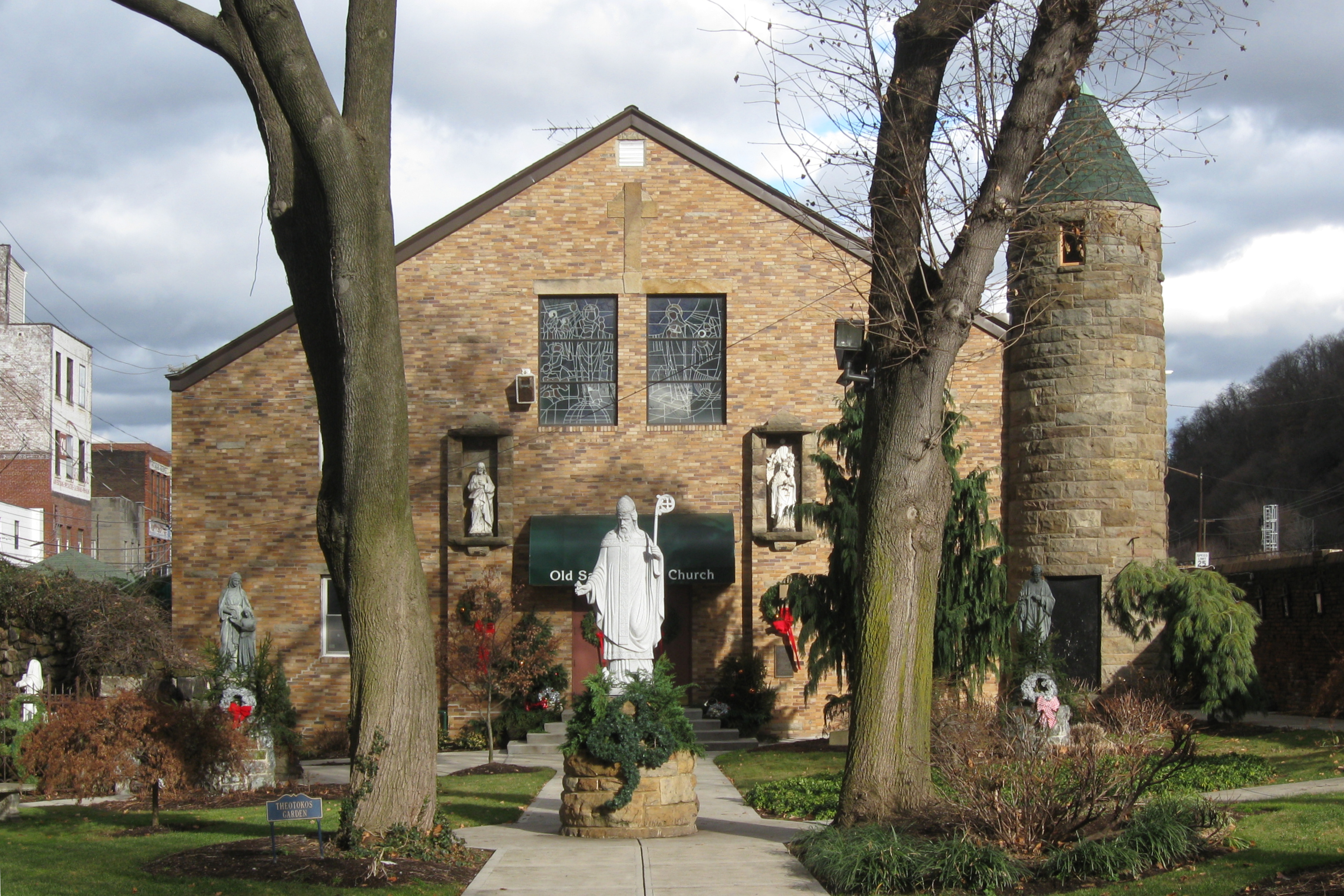
The exterior of Old St. Patrick's and its courtyard, here shown decorated for the Christmas season in 2019.

St. Patrick's Church (also known as Old St. Patrick's) is a historic Catholic church located in the Strip District neighborhood of Pittsburgh, Pennsylvania. Established in 1808, St. Patrick's was the first parish founded in what would become the Roman Catholic Diocese of Pittsburgh. Over its long history the parish has served successive immigrant communities and was closely associated with the Depression-era activism of Father James Renshaw Cox. The present church is notable for housing a replica of the Holy Stairs in Rome.

== History ==
=== First church (1808–1854) ===
St. Patrick's Parish was organized in 1808 under its first pastor, Rev. William F. X. O'Brien, who had been ordained that year in Baltimore and assigned to Pittsburgh. O'Brien immediately began construction of a modest brick church on Liberty and Washington Streets, near what later became Union Station. The lot had been donated in 1811 by James O'Hara and his wife Mary. O'Brien celebrated Mass in temporary quarters on Second Avenue and in other improvised chapels while the building was underway. The completed structure measured about 30 by 50 feet (9.1 by 15.2 m), plain in design and without ornament. Dedicated by Bishop Michael Francis Egan in August 1811 during the first Catholic episcopal visitation to western Pennsylvania, the building was the earliest Catholic church in the city. Its small congregation was financially weak, and initially pews were installed only by individual parishioners who could afford to pay carpenters. In 1812 Father O'Brien acquired a pipe organ for $700, the first to be placed in a Catholic church in western Pennsylvania.

After Father O'Brien's departure in 1820, the parish was taken up by Rev. Charles Maguire, who in 1825 enlarged St. Patrick's to meet the needs of a rapidly growing Catholic population. In 1827 he initiated plans for a much larger church at the corner of Grant Street and Fifth Avenue, with a cornerstone laid in 1829 and construction continuing into the 1830s. This work eventually gave rise to St. Paul's, which developed into the diocesan cathedral, while St. Patrick's remained a parish church.

When construction of St. Paul's was undertaken, the German Catholics of the city were encouraged to contribute toward its erection by the promise that St. Patrick's would be given to them as their own church once the new building was completed. This arrangement was carried out, and thus the parish that had first been Pittsburgh’s earliest English-speaking congregation became also its first German Catholic house of worship. Soon, however, the debt burden incurred in building St. Paul’s led Father O’Reilly, Maguire’s successor, to impose an annual rental of $300 on the Germans for the use of St. Patrick’s. Many objected to the arrangement, resulting in the organization of a second German parish, later organized as St. Philomena's, where the Redemptorist Fathers arrived in 1838 and succeeded in uniting the German community.

In October 1840, Father Edward F. Garland, ordained in 1838 and until then an assistant at St. Paul’s, was appointed pastor of St. Patrick’s. By that point the Germans had withdrawn to their own parishes, and St. Patrick’s again became an English-speaking congregation.

This first church burned in a fire that began in a nearby machine shop on the morning of August 10, 1854, which spread to the building and consumed it entirely.

=== Second church (1858–1865) ===
In the summer of 1856 Father McCullagh was transferred to St. Patrick’s, exchanging places with Father Garland, and under his tenure a new church was completed and dedicated on August 15, 1858. This second church was constructed of brick, measuring about 90 by 45 feet (27 by 14 m), with its front built into the hillside. A basement extended beneath much of the rear portion of the structure and served as the parish school.

With the rapid growth of Pittsburgh during the Civil War era, St. Patrick’s required additional clergy to assist its long-serving pastor, and by the 1860s it had become the leading English-speaking parish in western Pennsylvania. At the same time the Pennsylvania Railroad, whose freight and passenger operations were expanding around Union Station, sought to acquire the parish property for additional yard space. An agreement was reached with the pastor and congregation, and the church was sold to the company and subsequently demolished.

=== Third church (1865–1935) ===
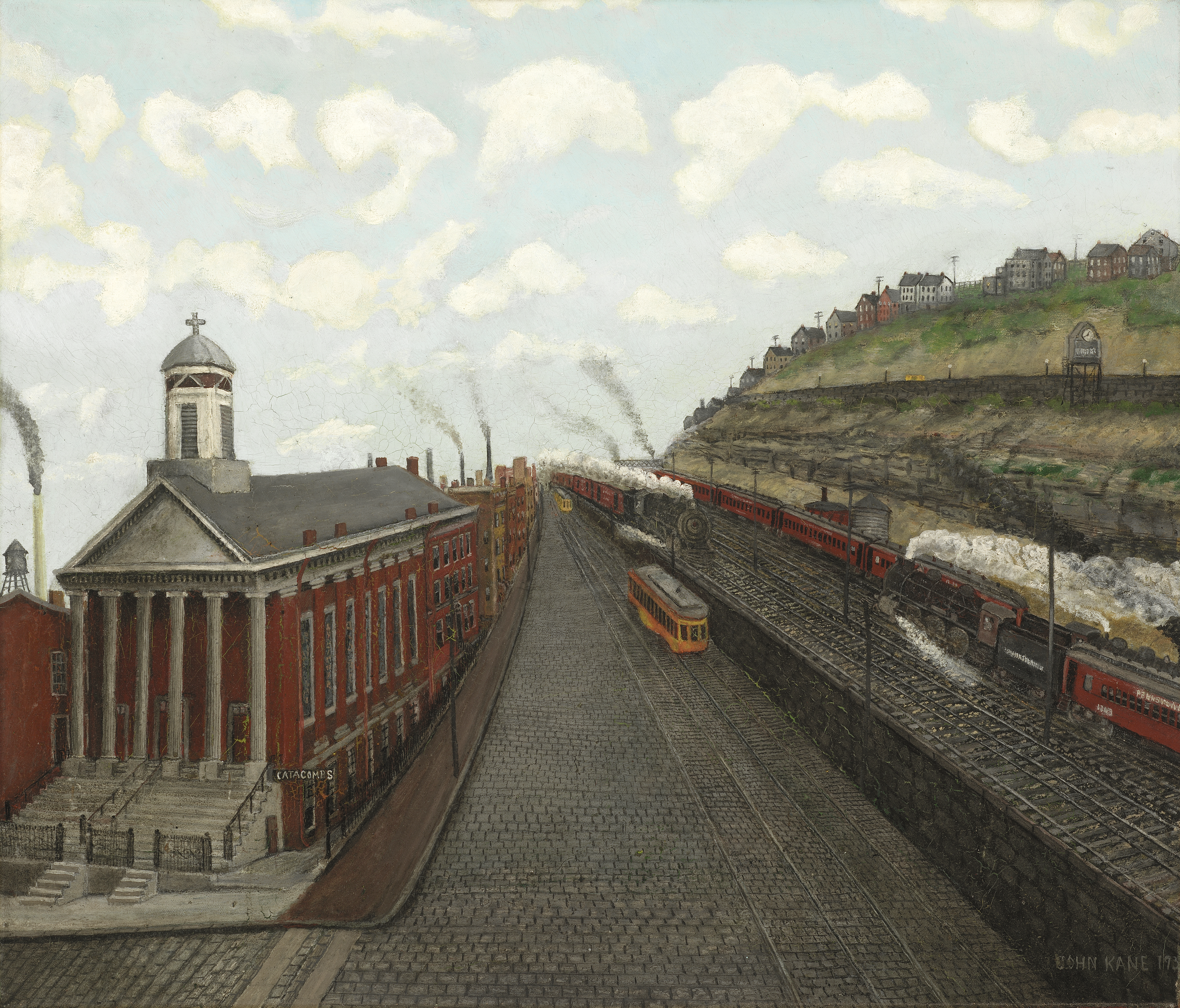
A painting of the third church by Pittsburgh-based naïve artist John Kane (1930), currently kept at the Detroit Institute of Arts.

A new church was erected at the corner of Liberty Avenue and Seventeenth Street, the location of the present parish church. This third church was built in a Greek Revival style, measuring approximately 120 by 60 feet (37 by 18 m), and was surmounted by a belfry. It was dedicated by Bishop Michael Domenec on December 17, 1865. The front elevation included a columned porch, while the interior featured a flat ceiling and three altars. A prominent stairway provided access from Seventeenth Street, and a full basement beneath the structure accommodated schoolrooms. A rectory for the clergy was constructed alongside it, and in 1867 a convent was added for the Sisters of Mercy, who continued their work in the parish school.

The pastor most closely associated with St. Patrick's in the 20th century was Father James R. Cox, a Pittsburgh native and World War I chaplain who was assigned to the parish following the war.

By the early 20th century the parish's composition had shifted from its original Irish founding families to a more diverse congregation drawn from the Strip District's working-class population. The future of the parish was in doubt, but the charisma and vision of Father Cox led to a renewal of the parish. Cox became widely known through his radio sermons and public support for local workers, including Pittsburgh taxi drivers seeking to unionize. During the Great Depression he oversaw a nearby shantytown and organized extensive relief efforts through soup kitchens, bread lines, medical clinics, a barber shop, and a shoe repair shop, as well as makeshift housing built from discarded materials. His broadcasts prompted donations of money, clothing, food, fuel, and other necessities from both private citizens and local merchants. In 1931 Cox led a peaceful march of about 15,000 unemployed men to Washington, D.C. to urge the federal government to provide relief.

Among the distinctive features added to the third church under Father Cox were "catacombs," subterranean passageways and rooms beneath the church that he promoted in the 1920s and early 1930s as a devotional attraction. Photographs show Cox celebrating Mass in the underground space, which drew visitors and small donations.

=== Fourth and present church ===
On March 21, 1935, a fire destroyed Old St. Patrick's Church, then 125 years old. The blaze broke out in the early morning hours and quickly spread through the building, injuring six people. Parish clergy, assisted by firefighters, were able to save the Blessed Sacrament and some parish records and relics before the structure was lost.

In the wake of the fire, Father Cox announced his intention to rebuild the church without delay. By August, he had announced plans for a new church, describing a design that would combine modern and classical elements and incorporate relics gathered during his travels in Europe and the Holy Land. He intended to include a model of the Scala Sancta, modeled on the Roman original, constructed of 28 steps brought from Jerusalem, as well as nearly 700 stones collected from sites such as Calvary, the Garden of Gethsemane, and the Holy Sepulchre. These features reflected Cox’s aim of reshaping the parish, by then diminished in size, into a pilgrimage destination that connected Pittsburgh Catholics to the wider devotional traditions of the Church.

The new church, on the same site at Liberty Avenue and Seventeenth Street, was dedicated on March 17, 1936. In 1937 the Monastery Gardens were added, including a large outdoor grotto with a marble altar where Masses were held in fair weather.

Cox continued to serve the parish and to preach on the radio in the years that followed, and he remained outspoken against bigotry until his death in 1951 at the age of 65.

== Architecture ==
After the destruction of the earlier building in 1935, Father Cox oversaw construction of the present St. Patrick's during the Great Depression. The new church, designed to resemble a rural stone church in Ireland, includes a small piece of the Blarney Stone set into its tower. Cox also incorporated a number of devotional features to promote the church as a site of pilgrimage. In the courtyard he added a replica of the grotto at Lourdes, while inside the sanctuary he installed a full-scale replica of the Scala Sancta, the 28 marble steps in Rome traditionally believed to have been climbed by Jesus on the way to his trial before Pontius Pilate. Like the original, the white marble stairs are intended to be ascended on one’s knees with prayers for each step, though brides may walk up them on their wedding day and side staircases provide alternate access to the chapel for those unable to kneel.

== Administration ==
By the late 20th century, further declining population in the Strip District made it impractical to sustain multiple parishes. In 1993 St. Patrick's merged with St. Stanislaus Kostka and St. Elizabeth to form the parish of St. Patrick–St. Stanislaus Kostka, with St. Patrick's Church continuing in use as one of its worship sites.

In 2019 the Roman Catholic Diocese of Pittsburgh reorganized several parishes and shrines into a new grouping known as the Shrines of Pittsburgh, established to promote the sites as places of pilgrimage and prayer. St. Patrick's Church was included in this grouping along with St. Stanislaus Kostka, St. Anthony's Chapel in Troy Hill, Immaculate Heart of Mary in Polish Hill, and St. Nicholas in Millvale.
