= Mollinger =

Mollinger is a surname. Notable people with the surname include:

- Alexander Mollinger (1836-1867), Dutch painter
- Suitbert Mollinger (1828–1892), American Roman Catholic priest
