= Suitbert Mollinger =

American Catholic priest (1828–1892)

Suitbert Godfrey Mollinger
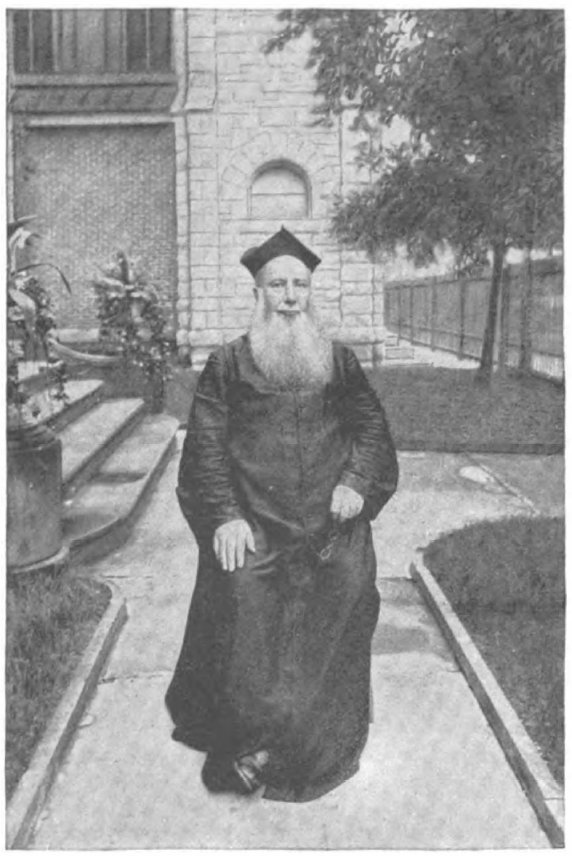
- Father Suitbert G. Mollinger seated outside St. Anthony's Chapel in Troy Hill, Pittsburgh, Pennsylvania, in 1890
- Born: April 19, 1828; Kampenhout, Kingdom of the Netherlands
- Died: June 15, 1892 (aged 64); Pittsburgh, Pennsylvania, United States
- Occupations: Priest, faith healer
- Years active: 1859-1892
- Religion: Roman Catholic
- Ordained: April 1859
- Congregations served: Brookville; St. Alphonsus in Wexford; St. Theresa in Perrysville; St. Anthony's Chapel

Suitbert Godfrey Mollinger (April 19, 1828 – June 15, 1892) (Note: Even early sources differed on Mollinger's birth date: Andrew Lambing gives April 1, 1830, while his gravestone records April 19, 1828.) was an American Roman Catholic priest in Pittsburgh, Pennsylvania, who founded St. Anthony's Chapel in Troy Hill, one of the largest collections of religious relics in the world. Pastor of Most Holy Name Parish from 1868 until his death, he gained national and international renown for his reputed healing abilities, attracting pilgrims from across the United States and abroad.

== Early life ==
=== Traditional accounts ===
Parish histories, contemporary memorials, and later accounts held that Mollinger was born in 1828 or 1830 in Kampenhout, Belgium, between Mechelen and Leuven. His father, François Frederik Mollinger, was sometimes described as having been prime minister of the Kingdom of Holland, but in reality he was a Dutch cavalry officer. His mother was Dorothea van Hellenberg, a member of a wealthy noble family from Gelderland, a province of the Netherlands. According to a long-accepted version of his biography, he toured Europe as a youth, studied medicine at institutions in Naples, Rome, and Genoa, and later entered the seminary in Ghent before traveling to the United States in 1854 to continue his priestly training.

Contemporary sources often embellished his biography. At least one German source, published in 1891, said Mollinger had studied medicine and served as a physician in the Dutch Colonial Army in India before entering the priesthood.

=== Modern research ===
In 2023, historian Katherine Lukaszewicz published the first sustained analysis of Mollinger's early life based on European archival sources. Drawing on court files, baptismal records, and digitized press archives, her research challenges many elements of the biographical narrative repeated during his lifetime and afterward. While traditional narratives maintained that he had a Protestant father, Lukaszewicz's research suggests that the Mollingers were in fact a Catholic family. Although he indisputably came from a wealthy background, it is possible that Mollinger had become estranged from at least some relatives and perhaps from the family fortune. His later ability to finance large-scale projects in Pittsburgh may have derived from an annuity left to him by an uncle.

More saliently, Lukaszewicz found no documentary evidence that he had studied at Ghent or practiced medicine in Europe before ordination, despite longstanding claims to that effect. Instead, Mollinger had worked as a tobacconist in his youth, founding a tobacco shop in Amsterdam in 1846 but selling it after mixed success. Dutch prison registers and contemporary newspapers show that in 1852, at age 23, he was tried in Maastricht for insurance fraud and suspected arson after a fire at his lodgings in Venlo destroyed property he had recently insured for large sums. During this period, he styled himself a seminarian or theological student but testimony during his trial revealed that he was not actively enrolled in any program of that kind. In the end, he was convicted of fraud but acquitted of arson, thereby avoiding the death penalty under the Napoleonic Code. Sentenced to five years in the prison at Hoorn, he was released six months early for good conduct. Mollinger left Europe almost immediately after the end of his prison sentence in 1856 and arrived in New York before eventually settling in western Pennsylvania.

== Emigration and early ministry ==
The early 20th-century Pittsburgh historian Father Andrew Lambing records that before deciding to devote himself to the secular priesthood, Mollinger "applied to at least three different religious orders and spent some time in one of them." While his theological education is difficult to substantiate, it does appear that Mollinger was ordained a priest by Bishop Joshua Maria Young of the Diocese of Erie. Even Lambing was unable to locate an official record of his ordination, but held in his possession a copy of the newly ordained priest's first letter of faculties dating from April 1859.

Mollinger's first pastoral assignment was in Brookville, the seat of Jefferson County, Pennsylvania, which he used as a base for ministering to a network of surrounding mission stations. According to an 1888 history, he arrived in Brookville by 1858 as an assistant to Father Thomas Ledewith and succeeded him as pastor no later than June 1859, residing in the town while attending missions throughout Jefferson County and neighboring parts of Clarion County, including Corsica, Redbank, and Sligo Furnace. Parish records from St. Nicholas Church in Crates (Limestone Township) place Mollinger among the priests in attendance there beginning in 1859 and continuing until 1865, reflecting his regular service of mission stations in the Brookville area during this period.

On one occasion, lacking transportation, he walked 12 mi (19 km) carrying vestments and liturgical items to celebrate Mass, then continued in the summer heat to a second mission at Carr's Furnace, where he collapsed from exhaustion before recovering to complete his duties. During this period, he appears to have begun practicing medicine as part of his pastoral work, attending to the physical ailments of his parishioners.

Sustained disagreements with Bishop Young, described in county histories as centering chiefly on St. Ann's Academy at Corsica, ultimately led Mollinger to leave the diocese in late 1864 or early 1865 and transfer to the Diocese of Pittsburgh. His initial assignments in the Pittsburgh diocese included pastorates at the churches of St. Alphonsus in Wexford and St. Theresa in Perrysville.

== Pastorate in Pittsburgh and St. Anthony's Chapel ==
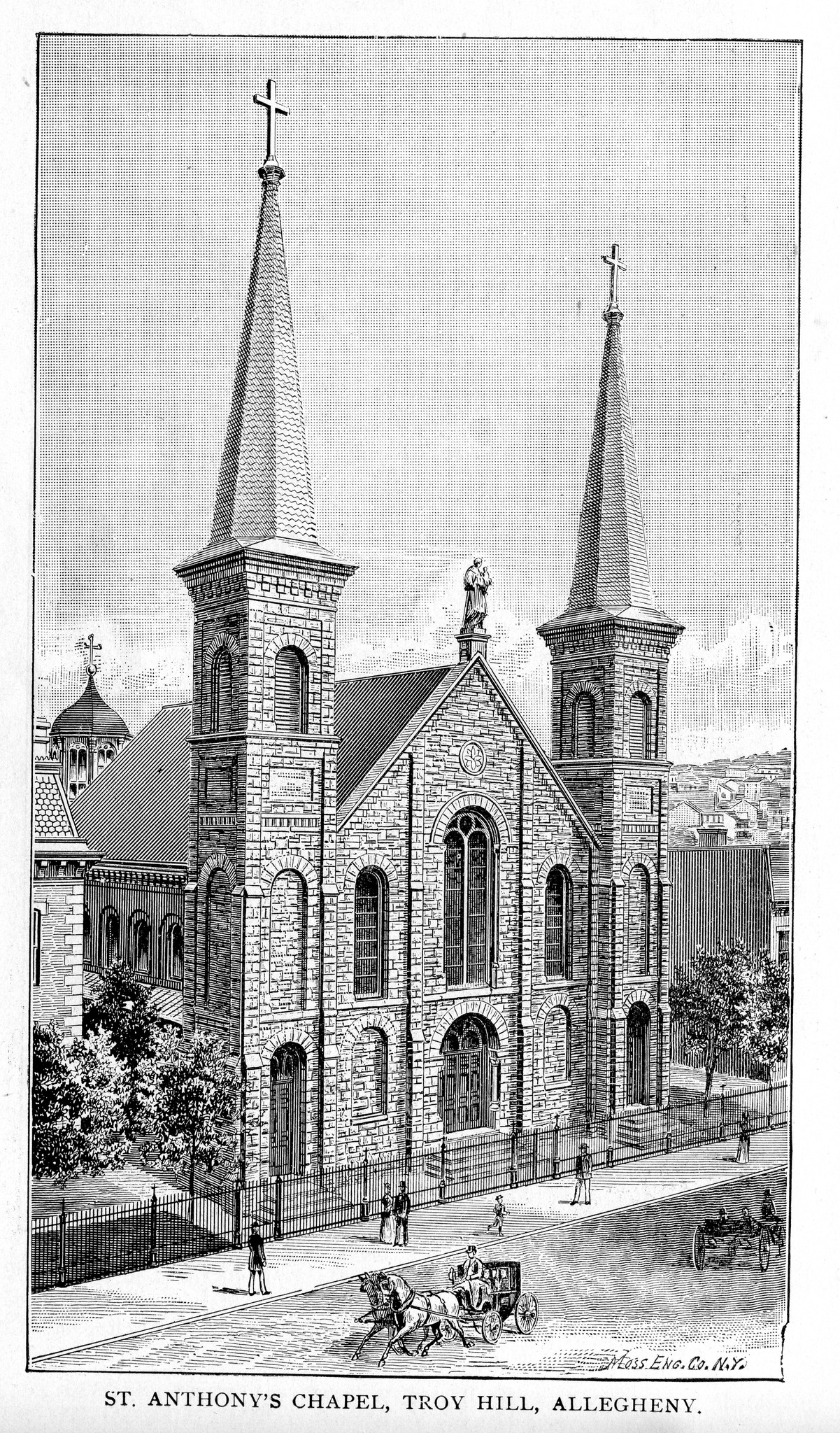
Engraving of St. Anthony's Chapel c. 1890, showing the twin spires and street activity in front of the church

On July 4, 1868, Bishop Michael Domenec appointed Mollinger pastor of the newly organized Most Holy Name Parish, established to serve the German Catholic community of Troy Hill. Soon after his arrival, he placed a statue of St. Anthony of Padua in the church and began actively promoting devotion to the saint.

Under his leadership, the parish flourished. In 1874, Mollinger oversaw the establishment of the Home of the Good Shepherd as a shelter for "fallen women", a move that provoked opposition from some social groups but which he defended as an act of charity. The Sisters of the Good Shepherd came from Buffalo, New York, to administer the Home and the parish school. A new convent was built for them, with the dedication on September 8, 1885. He also oversaw the construction of a large European-style rectory decorated with trophies from his hunting excursions, finished in 1877.

Early on in his ministry, Mollinger also began producing remedies such as cough syrups and tonics in a dispensary near the parish house, drawing criticism from church officials and the local medical society, but substantiating his work with proof of a medical degree.

During visits to European monasteries, he began acquiring relics, reportedly making substantial donations in exchange for items to bring back to Pittsburgh. By 1880, Lambing recorded that Mollinger had amassed perhaps four thousand relics, arranged in a specially prepared room, and described the collection as "one of the largest and rarest in America". As the collection outgrew the available space in the church and rectory, Mollinger financed the construction of a dedicated chapel to St. Anthony. Work on the first iteration began on June 13, 1882, and it was dedicated a year later. In stages, he expanded the structure, completing the final phase shortly before his death in 1892. Newspapers praised the size and lavish decoration of the chapel. On the occasion of the chapel's dedication in 1892, the Pittsburg Dispatch observed that the structure was "furnished with such magnificence as to almost make the beholder question whether St. Anthony should be called the patron of Father Mollinger or Father Mollinger the patron of St. Anthony."

Drawing on his self-described medical background and his role as a priest, Mollinger began to offer treatments to ill visitors at the reliquary chapel, combining pharmaceutical interventions with spiritual remedies. This attracted pilgrims from beyond the parish and contributed to Mollinger's growing reputation. From the mid-1880s onward, newspaper coverage increasingly focused on his healing ministry, with media attention peaking each June after the Feast of St. Anthony. By 1890, his fame was international; accounts spoke of pilgrims traveling from across the United States and overseas to Troy Hill. Reports from the San Francisco Examiner and the Baltimore Sunday Herald in 1891 estimated that 20,000 people attended the feast that year.

== Death ==
Mollinger died on June 15, 1892, two days after celebrating the Feast of St. Anthony and dedicating the completed chapel. He died after attempted surgery for a ruptured stomach, a condition aggravated by fatigue from the thousands of visitors gathered to seek cures at his hands.

=== Wealth and estate ===
During his lifetime, Mollinger's wealth was the subject of wild speculation. In 1885, one report estimated his fortune at five million dollars ($175 million in 2024), a sum that would have placed him alongside Pittsburgh's most prominent industrialists, such as Thomas Mellon and George Westinghouse. At the time of his death in 1892, some sources projected an estate of three million dollars ($105 million in 2024), but these figures were certainly exaggerated. While he had received substantial sums from his family and charitable contributions, most was spent on acquiring relics, housing them in reliquaries, purchasing property, and silently bankrolling various initiatives of the Catholic diocese. The highest credible posthumous valuation placed his estate at under $75,000 ($2.62 million in 2024).

He died intestate, dashing public expectations that his will would reveal a vast fortune and set out provisions for the parish and chapel. In the absence of a will, prolonged legal disputes arose over his personal property, the rights to his medical compounds, and the ownership of the chapel's relics. Resolving the estate required two lawsuits, the arrival of estranged Dutch nephews, and the intervention of Bishop Richard Phelan, who signed a mortgage on behalf of the parishioners so that St. Anthony's Chapel and most of its contents could be purchased from the legal heirs. While the chapel was preserved, the heirs sold Mollinger's secular belongings, certain sacred items such as the altar and candelabras, and funds he had earmarked for the chapel's upkeep.

In the decades following his death, druggists marketed "Father Mollinger's Medicines", which bore no genuine connection to him.

== Legacy and evaluation ==
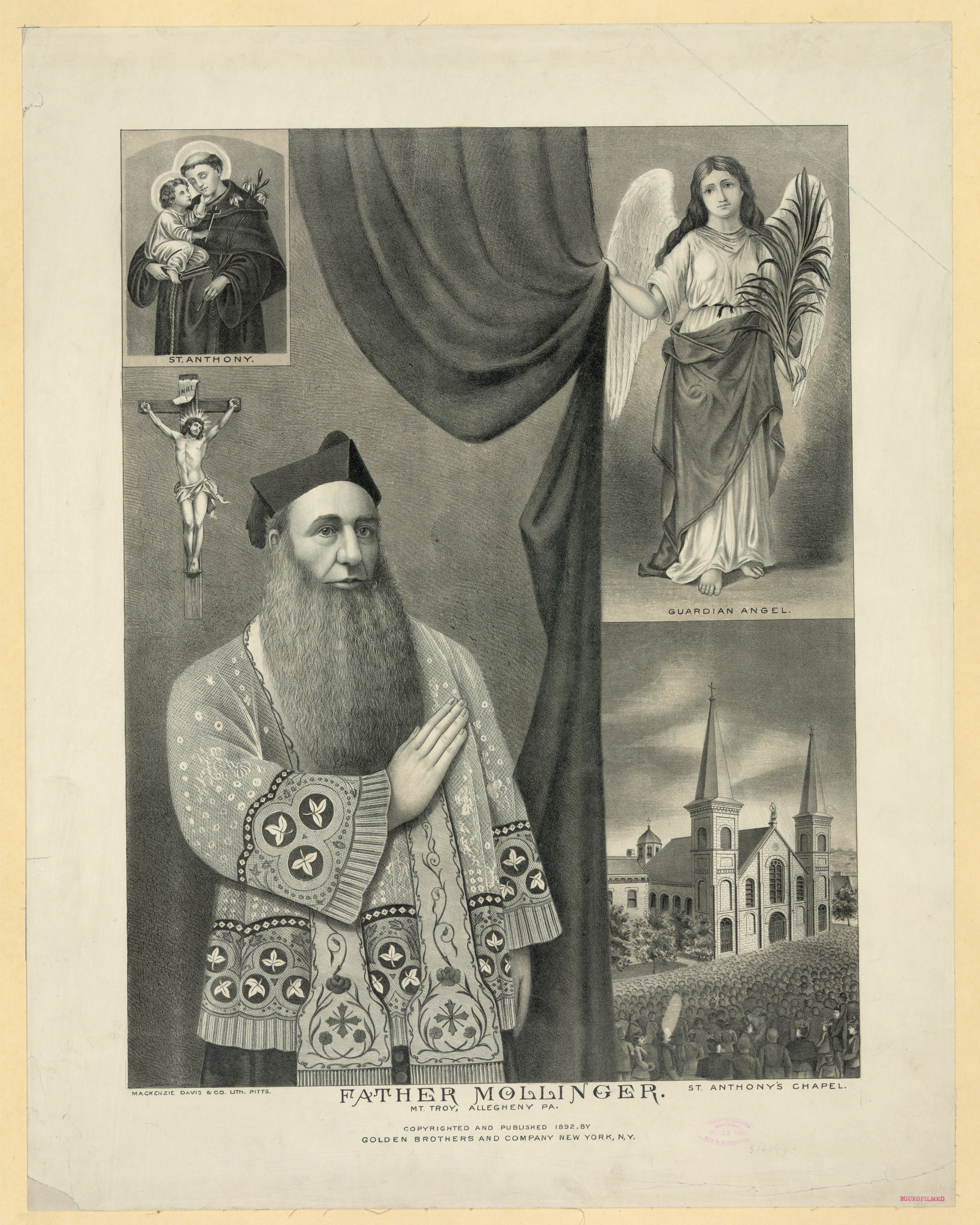
An 1893 lithograph of Father Mollinger with St. Anthony's Chapel, a devotional image of St. Anthony, and an angel

Modern historians note major gaps and contradictions in the record of Mollinger's life. Contemporary newspapers that publicized his ministry made no mention of his earlier criminal conviction, and many biographical details long accepted in parish histories lack corroborating documentation.

=== Relic collector ===
The size, scope, and the alleged antiquity and provenance of the relics that Mollinger collected in Troy Hill has been subject to critical scrutiny and skepticism.

Speaking as a contemporary of Mollinger's, Lambing notes that the authenticity of every relic in the chapel's extensive collection could not be guaranteed, but he believed that Mollinger took great care to avoid being deceived. Mollinger's wealth and European contacts enabled him to assemble a large collection of relics, especially during an era when monasteries in Germany and Italy were being dissolved and their contents dispersed. With help from intermediaries who monitored such opportunities, he was able to obtain relics and related devotional items in large numbers. Later research has identified some of these intermediaries, notably Father Hyacinth Epp, a Capuchin priest based at St. Augustine's Church in Lawrenceville, who was among Mollinger's most trusted friends and aides.

=== Faith healer ===
From the mid-1880s, press coverage increasingly emphasized reports of cures attributed to Mollinger's treatments, especially during the annual Feast of Saint Anthony on June 13. Newspapers in major U.S. cities, Canada, and even as far away as the New Zealand Tablet depicted Troy Hill as a pilgrimage destination drawing thousands annually, with some reports claiming visitors came from Europe and Asia. The Irish Canadian and other papers noted that he never granted personal interviews, further enhancing his mystique.

From the late 1880s onward, national and international press regularly featured his cures, especially in June and July; one report claimed that a single man from Louisville, Kentucky, who had been cured, returned the following year with a group of one hundred pilgrims. Contemporary newspapers often published named testimonies. The Pittsburg Press in 1892 described, for example, Annie Moore of Oil City, who claimed restored sight after influenza, and Michael O'Regon of Youngstown, who said he could walk again after spinal injury. Other reports emphasized the hardships pilgrims endured to reach Troy Hill, describing travelers who spent their last funds on rail fare and slept in crowded day coaches to see the priest.

Accounts of Mollinger's healings ranged from skeptical medical assessments to sensational claims of mass healings. The Philadelphia Medical News, for example, noted that many were not cured and warned of the sacrifices made by the poor, while conceding that he was a sincere and (ostensibly) licensed physician. Other reports claimed healings "running up into the thousands."

Contemporary sources described Mollinger as nearly six feet tall, strongly built, and "imposing." Lambing noted in particular that that "the long heavy beard which he wore was calculated to add to the impression which his size and appearance would naturally make on the people who thronged to his chapel." By the time of his death in 1892, the Feast of Saint Anthony had become a major event in Troy Hill, with contemporaries estimating that as many as 150 people visited him daily. A newspaper report in 1891 estimated that he had treated nearly 50,000 people over the course of his ministry.

Mollinger's methods combined religious ritual with medical treatment, and for his own part he did not claim to work miracles. Newspaper accounts describe Latin blessings accompanied by holy water pressed onto the eyelids of those with impaired vision; prescriptions of prayer paired with medicinal compounds prepared by a local druggist; and, in some cases, direct verbal exhortation, such as telling patients to put down their crutches or rise from a wheelchair. Patients sometimes reported immediate recovery after following his instructions, clutching a crucifix, or even touching devotional objects in the chapel, such as the communion rail or a statue of St. Anthony. In treating the sick, he often blended natural and supernatural means, investigating each case, blessing the afflicted, and prescribing regimens that might include repeated chapel visits, specific prayers, abstinence from meat on Fridays for non-Catholics, and the use of medicines according to his instructions.

After reviewing hundreds of cases, Lukaszewicz concluded that his most consistent successes involved vision loss, hearing loss, and impaired mobility—symptoms now recognized as forms of conversion disorder, in which no underlying disease can be found. In the nineteenth century, such cases were labeled "hysteria", and contemporary theorists like Freud and Breuer observed that symptoms often resolved when patients confronted and verbalized the events that provoked them. Mollinger tempered expectations when presented with ailments outside the scope of his abilities, declining to promise results in congenital disabilities, advanced cancer, or epilepsy, and sometimes referring patients to surgeons or other physicians, occasionally paying for their care himself.
