= Scala Sancta =

Stairs in Rome

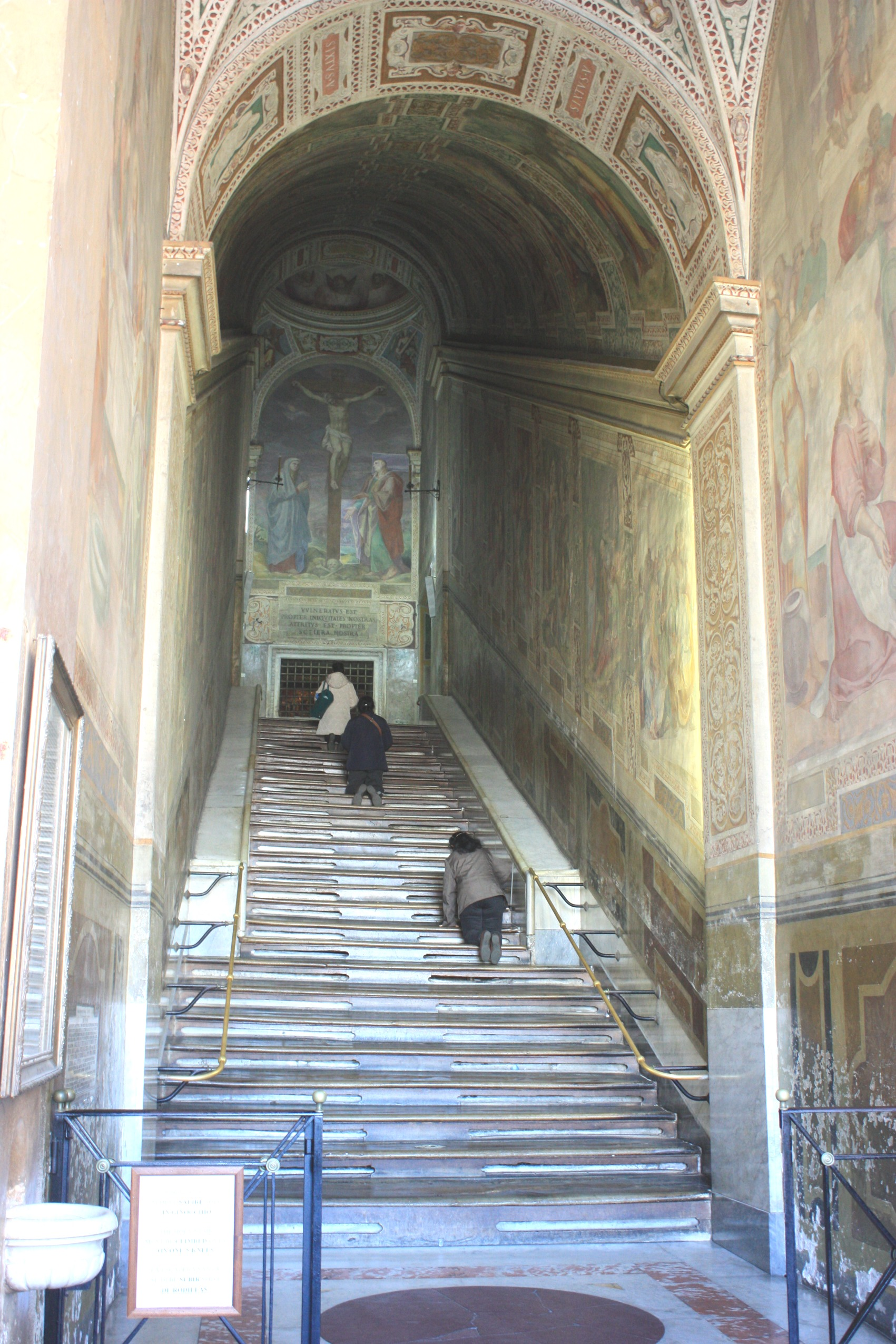
Scala Sancta

The Scala Sancta (English: Holy Stairs, Italian: Scala Santa) are a set of 28 white marble steps located in an edifice on extraterritorial property of the Holy See in Rome, Italy proximate to the Archbasilica of Saint John in Laterano. Officially, the edifice is titled the Pontifical Sanctuary of the Holy Stairs (Pontificio Santuario della Scala Santa), and incorporates part of the old Papal Lateran Palace. Replica wooden stairs encase the original staircase, which may only be climbed on one's knees. The Holy Stairs lead to the Church of Saint Lawrence in Palatio ad Sancta Sanctorum (Chiesa di San Lorenzo in Palatio ad Sancta Sanctorum) or simply the "Sancta Sanctorum" (English: Holy of Holies), which was the personal chapel of the early Popes.

According to Catholic Church tradition, the Holy Stairs were the steps leading up to the praetorium of Pontius Pilate in Jerusalem on which Jesus Christ stepped on his way to trial during his Passion. The Stairs reputedly were brought to Rome by Saint Helena in the fourth century. In the Middle Ages they were known as Scala Pilati ("the Stairs of Pilate").

For centuries, the Scala Sancta has attracted Christian pilgrims who wish to honour the Passion of Jesus Christ. Since the early 1700s, the Holy Stairs have been encased in wood for protection, but were briefly exposed in 2019 following restoration work.

== History ==
According to Catholic Church tradition, the Holy Stairs were the steps leading up to the praetorium of Pontius Pilate in Jerusalem on which Jesus Christ stepped on his way to trial during his Passion.

Medieval legends claim that Saint Helena, mother of Emperor Constantine the Great, brought the Holy Stairs from Jerusalem to Rome circa AD 326. In the Middle Ages, they were known as the Scala Pilati ("Stairs of Pilate"). From old plans it appears that they led to a corridor of the Lateran Palace, near the Chapel of Saint Sylvester, and were covered with a special roof. In 1589, Pope Sixtus V had the Papal Lateran Palace, then in ruins, demolished to make way for the construction of a new one. He ordered the Holy Stairs be reconstructed in their present location, before the Sancta Sanctorum ("Holy of Holies"), the chapel so named for the many precious relics preserved there. The chapel also houses an icon of Christ Pantocrator, known as the "Uronica", that was supposedly begun by Saint Luke and finished by an angel. This celebrated icon of Santissimi Salvatore Acheiropoieton ("not made by human hands"), on certain occasions, used to be carried through Rome in procession.

The Scala Sancta may only be ascended on the knees. For common use, the staircase is flanked by four additional staircases, two on each side, constructed circa 1589. In 1724, Pope Benedict XIII covered the marble stairs in wood for their protection, since the marble had been significantly worn away by the many pilgrims ascending the stairs over time. The stairs remained covered until 2019, when the protective wood covering was removed and the marble exposed following restoration work. When the stairs were reopened on 11 April 2019, pilgrims were permitted to ascend the exposed marble stairs on their knees for the first time in almost 300 years. The stairs remained exposed and open to the public between April 2019 and July 2019, and then were again covered in wood.

== Decoration ==
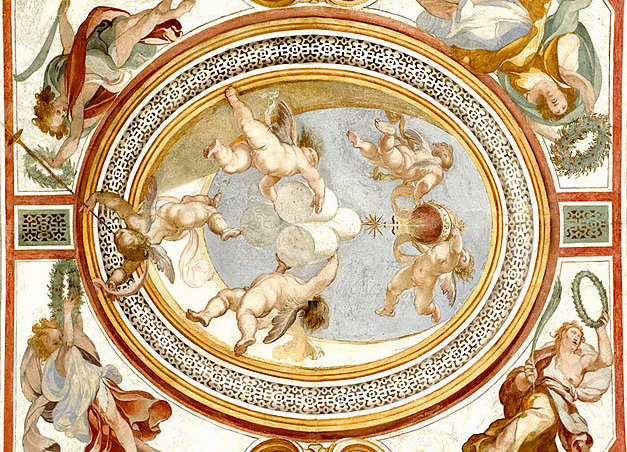
A fresco at Scala Sancta

The decoration of the Scala Sancta was one of the major renovations of the pontificate of Pope Sixtus V, led by Cesare Nebbia and Giovanni Guerra and occupying a crew of artists to decorate frescoes including Giovanni Baglione, Giacomo Stella, Giovanni Battista Pozzo, Paris Nogari, Prospero Orsi, Ferraù Fenzoni, Paul Bril, Paulo Guidotti, Giovanni Battista Ricci, Cesare Torelli, Antonio Vivarini, Andrea Lilio, Cesare and Vincenzo Conti, Baldassare Croce, Ventura Salimbeni, and Antonio Scalvati. Numerous preliminary drawings by Nebbia for these frescoes are extant, though it is not known with certainty who painted each fresco.

A major restoration was completed in 2007 and funded largely by the Getty Foundation. In early 2018, a restoration of the frescoes began, causing the Scala Sancta to be closed for over a year.

== Scala Sancta in the Catholic Church ==
Climbing the Holy Stairs on one's knees is a devotion much in favour with pilgrims and the faithful. Several popes have performed the devotion, and the Catholic Church has granted indulgences for it. Pope Pius VII on 2 September 1817 granted those who ascend the Stairs in the prescribed manner an indulgence of nine years for every step. Pope Pius X, on 26 February 1908, conceded a plenary indulgence as often as the Stairs are devoutly ascended after Confession and Holy Communion. On 11 August 2015, the Apostolic Penitentiary granted a plenary indulgence to all who, "inspired by love", climbed the Stairs on their knees while meditating on Christ's passion, and also went to Confession, received Holy Communion, and recited certain other Catholic prayers, including a prayer for the Pope's intentions. Those who were physically impeded from climbing the stairs could obtain the plenary indulgence by meditating on Christ's passion while at the Stairs and completing the other conditions.

As part of the ceremonies opening the Holy Year in 1933, Cardinal Francesco Marchetti Selvaggiani, Vicar of Rome, led a crowd of hundreds in mounting the steps on their knees.

Between April 2019 and July 2019, pilgrims were permitted to ascend the stairs kneeling on the original uncovered marble steps for the first time in almost 300 years. As a result, visitor numbers during this time increased threefold from the usual, and long lines formed at the entrance.

== Visitors ==
Scala Sancta

Martin Luther climbed the steps on his knees in 1510. As he did so, he repeated the "Our Father" on each step. It was said that by doing this work one could "redeem a soul from purgatory." But when Luther arrived at the top he could not suppress his doubt, saying "Who knows whether this is true?"

During his exile in Rome, Irish Gaelic lord Hugh O'Neill accompanied Pope Paul V in Catholic ceremonies and traditions. This included ascending the steps on his knees.

Charles Dickens, after visiting the Scala Sancta in 1845, wrote: "I never, in my life, saw anything at once so ridiculous and so unpleasant as this sight." He described the scene of pilgrims ascending the staircase on their knees as a "dangerous reliance on outward observances".

== Copies of the Scala Sancta ==
Imitations of the Scala Sancta were erected in several locations and indulgences were often attached to them:

- Rome, Borgo Santo Spirito: the stairs lead to the Church of Santi Michele e Magno.
- Ducal palace, Mantua, Italy: 1614-5 by Ferdinando Gonzaga, then a cardinal, later Duke of Mantua.
- Sacro Monte di Varallo, Piedmont, Italy
- Saint Paul Church, Campli, Italy (42°43′28.5″N 13°41′5.7″E): Pope Clement XIV acknowledged Campli in 1772 with the ownership of the Holy Stairs.
- San Girolamo, Reggio Emilia
- Veroli, Italy
- Montano Antilia, Italy on the Panzuto property
- Basilica of Sainte-Anne-d'Auray, France (47°42′17.47″N 2°57′9.27″W)
- Kalvarienbergkirche, Bad Tölz, Germany (47°45′49″N 11°33′21″E)
- Kreuzbergkirche, Bonn, Germany (50°42′51″N 7°4′48″E): Clemens August of Bavaria, ordered the retrofitting of this church with a "Scala Sancta" according to the plans of the Baroque architect Balthasar Neumann. It was constructed between 1745 and 1751.
- Františkánsky kostol Nepoškvrneného Počatia Panny Márie, Malacky, Slovakia
- Church of Our Lady and Saint Charlemagne in Karlov, Prague, Czech Republic (1708–11)
- Loretto Chapel in Brno, Czech Republic
- Chapel of the Holy Stairs in the Monastery on the Mountain of the Mother of God in Dolní Hedeč, Králíky, Czech Republic
- Pilgrim Chapel of the Holy Stairs in Rumburk, Czech Republic (1767–70)
- Basilica of Sainte-Anne-de-Beaupré outside Quebec City, Canada
- Sanctuaire du Sacré-Coeur et de Saint-Padre-Pio in Montreal, Canada
- St. Patrick Church in Pittsburgh, Pennsylvania, United States
- The National Shrine of the Cross in the Woods in Indian River, Michigan, United States
- Holy Family Chapel of the Congregation of the Sisters of Saint Joseph in Nazareth (unofficial locality), Kalamazoo County, Michigan, United States
- Our Lady of Lourdes Grotto in Lowell, Massachusetts United States
- Church of the Exaltation of the Holy Cross in Sośnica, Lower Silesian Voivodeship, Poland
