= Ferraù Fenzoni =

Italian painter

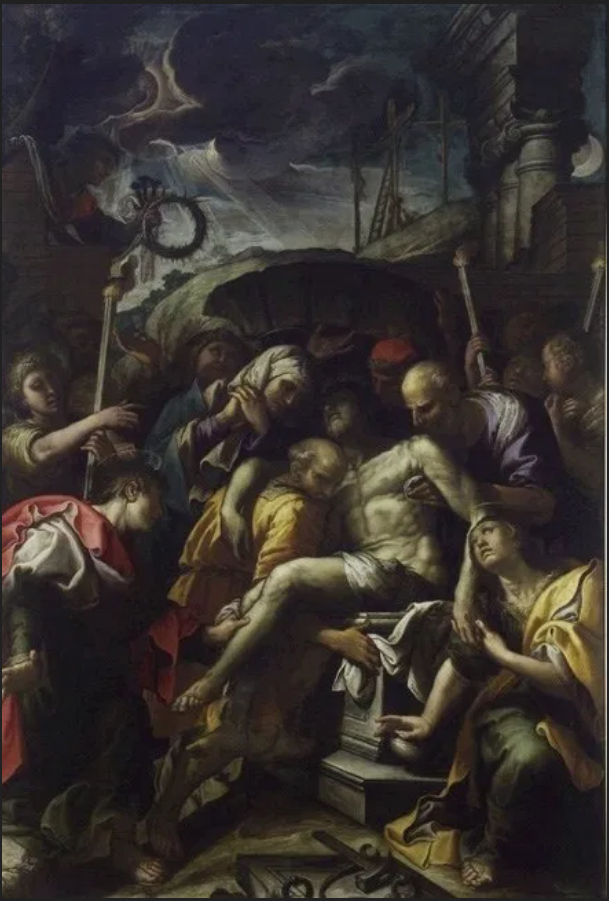
The deposition

Ferraù Fenzoni (1562 – 11 April 1645) was an Italian painter and draughtsman. He was a canvas and fresco painter of biblical and religious subjects who worked in a late Mannerist style. He trained and worked in Rome in his youth and later he worked on important commissions in Todi and his native Faenza. He is also called 'Ferraù da Faenza' and 'Il Faenzone' after his birthplace Faenza.

== Life ==
Ferraù Fenzoni was born in Faenza and moved to Rome as a young man in the early 1580s. He was apprenticed in Rome during the papacy of Gregory XIII and worked on numerous fresco cycles under pope Sixtus V, such as the Loggia della Benedizioni in the Lateran Palace, the frescoes on the walls and vaults of the Scala Santa of the adjacent Basilica of San Giovanni in Laterano, and the decoration in the Sistine library.

From 1594, he worked in Todi. He made illusionistic decorations in the bishop's palace ánd various altarpieces and murals in the Cathedral of Todi. Most of the latter is lost except for an impressive Last Judgement.

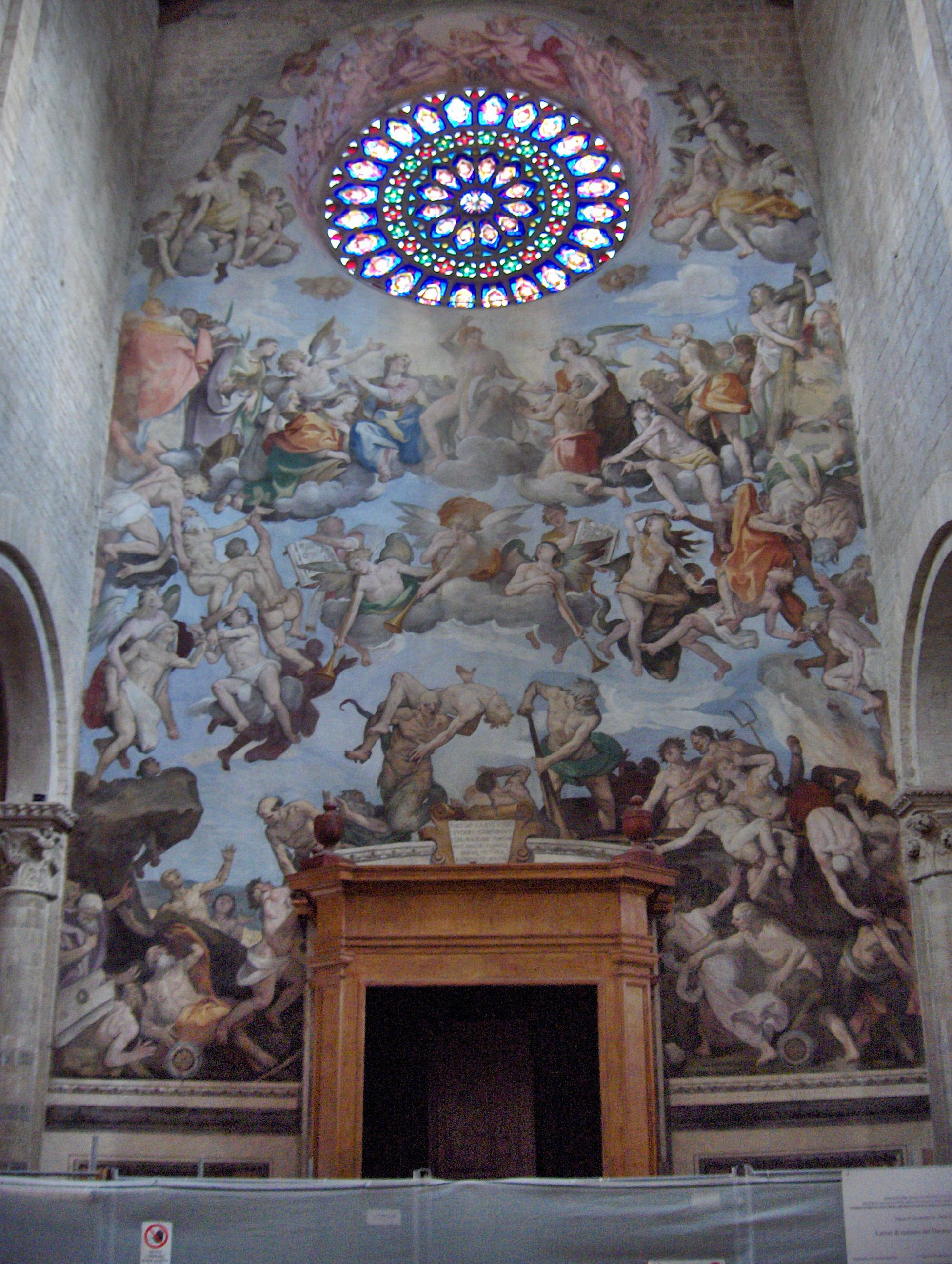
Last Judgment, Todi Cathedral

He returned to Faenza in 1599 where he remained for the rest of his career. He decorated chapels in the cathedral of Faenza from 1612 to 1616. In 1622, he completed a Deposition (local Pinacoteca). Among his most important works of his late period are The Pool of Bethesda, made around 1600 for the confraternity of San Giovanni Decollato. He also worked for churches in other locations of Romagna, including Bagnacavallo, Castel Bolognese and Cesena. One of his last significant paintings is an altarpiece of The deposition from around 1622, painted for the artist's chapel in the church of the now destroyed Madonna del Fuoco Church in Faenza. At the end of the 1620s, Fenzoni stopped painting, due to his bad eyesight.

The artist became a prominent local figure and received various honours. In 25 April 1634, he was made the vicar and keeper (castellano) of Granarolo. In 1640, Cardinal Girolamo Colonna made Fenzoni a knight in the Order of the Golden Spur (cavaliere dello speron d’oro).

== Work ==
His expressive canvases are executed in a late Mannerist style. His style was influenced by the artists working for the court of Rudolf II in Prague who are referred to as Northern Mannerists. His chromatic range, use of light, and iridescent tones, however, place him within the tradition of Federico Barocci. Fenzoni's work further has affinities with the work of Francesco Vanni and Andrea Lilio, two artists with whom he exchanged drawings.

Fenzoni was a prolific draughtsman and continued to draw into his old age. His reputation was such that he was able to obtain commissions for pen drawings, which were sold as autonomous works of art. He is mainly known today for his drawings rather than his painting. Approximately 160 drawings by his hand have survived, a large portion of which are in the collection of the Uffizi in Florence.
