= San Girolamo, Reggio Emilia =

Church building in Reggio nell'Emilia, Italy

Coordinates: 44.69456°N 10.63602°E

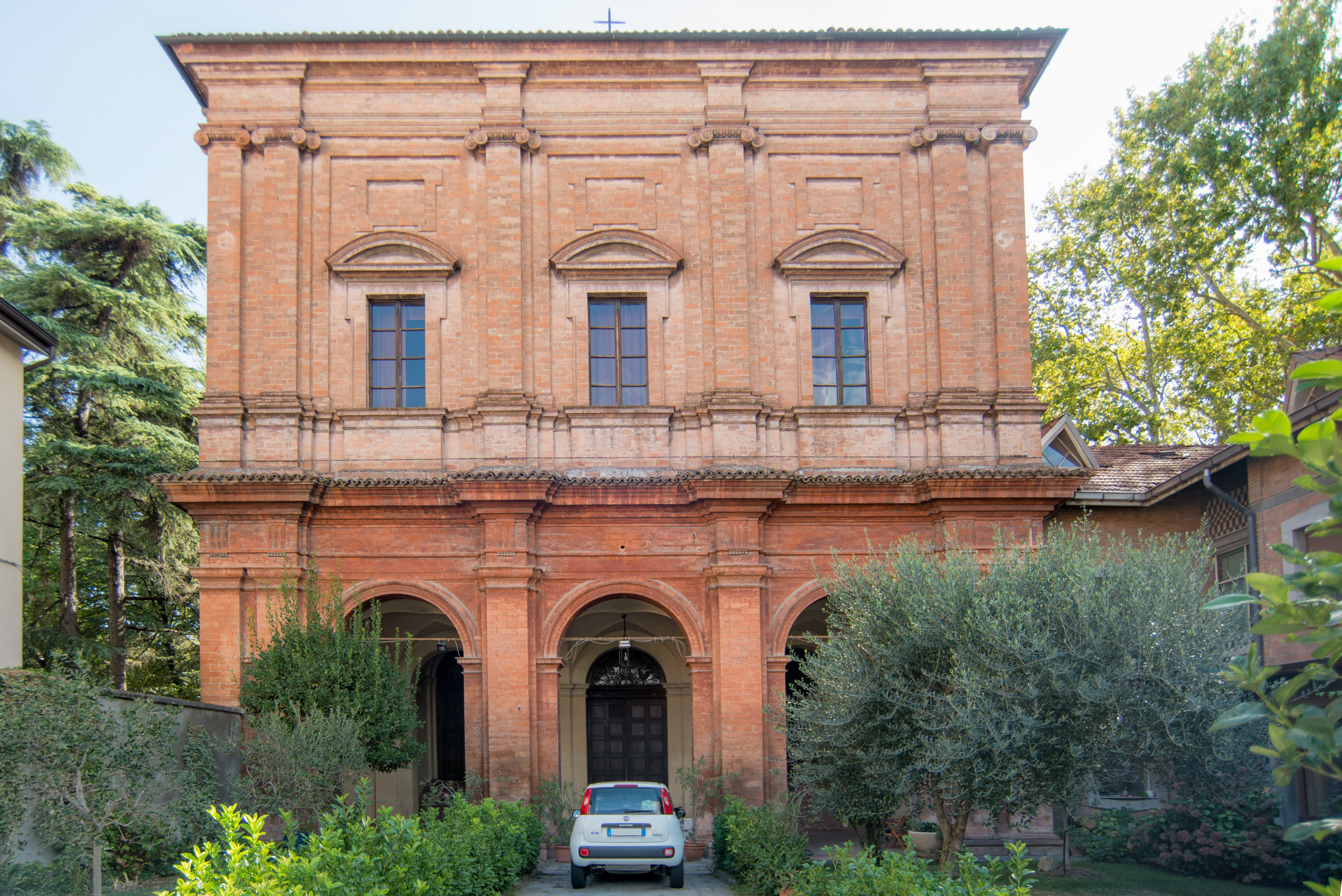
Church of San Girolamo, Reggio nell’Emilia.

San Girolamo, also known as Santi Girolamo e Vitale, is a Baroque Roman Catholic church in central Reggio Emilia, Italy. It is located on Via San Girolamo #24.

== History ==
A church at the site may have existed since the 4th century, but with no direct documentation. It is known that since the 10th century, a church dedicated to San Vitale Martire, and governed by monks of the Convent of San Rafaelle. The church building at the site, poorly conserved, was transferred in 1350 by the patronage of Count Valerio Valeri to the Franciscan flagellant Confraternity of St Jerome and underwent reconstruction. In 1600, a wealthy member of the confraternity, Ippollito Pratonieri, after a pilgrimage to the Holy Land, set aside an endowment to reproduce the crypt of the Church of the Holy Sepulchre. This reconstruction, begun in 1646 and designed by Gaspare Vigarani and completed by Girolamo Beltrami and Francesco Mori, led to the Baroque interiors we see today.

The exterior entrance is a two-story three bay brick facade with an open ground portico, all bays flanked by pilasters. The interior is peculiar and eclectic, and consists of three prayer halls linked by corridors and stairs. The atrium stairs are meant to be a replica of the Scala Santa in Rome, and lead up to two flanking rectangular oratories. Next the circular dome (Rotonda), dedicated to Saints Simone and Giuda, is surrounded two tiers of colonnades, Solomonic atop Corinthian, placed one on top of the other, decorated with stucco statues of saints and a central altar. The center of the dome ceiling is frescoed with a circle of angels. Below the Rotonda, is the crypt or Sotterranea, built with the proportions measured by Pratonieri, was meant to be a replica of the sepulchre of Christ. The church is decorated with flowers during Christmas.

The Confraternity of the church commissioned from Camillo Procaccini (1555-1629) an altarpiece depicting the Madonna and Child with Saints Vitalis, Jerome and Francis, was looted by the Napoleonic forces, and now on display in the Galleria Estense of Modena.
