= Saint Anthony's Chapel, Pittsburgh =

Catholic chapel in Pittsburgh, Pennsylvania

Saint Anthony Chapel
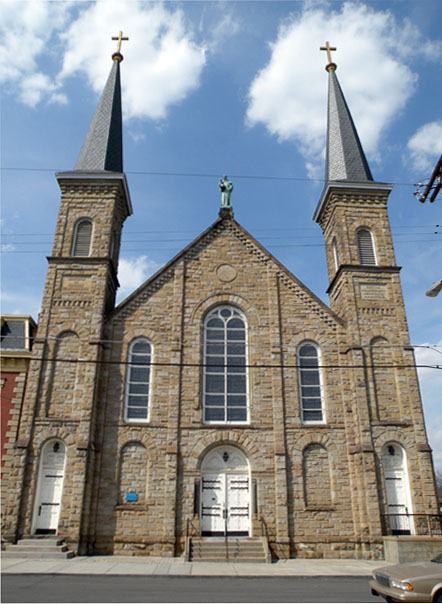

- Location of Saint Anthony's Chapel in Pittsburgh

Religion
- Affiliation: Roman Catholic
- Diocese: Roman Catholic Diocese of Pittsburgh
- Ecclesiastical or organisational status: Chapel
- Year consecrated: 1883

Location
- Location: 1700 Harpster Street, Troy Hill neighborhood, Pittsburgh, Pennsylvania
- Coordinates: 40.464889°N 79.983689°W

Architecture
- Type: Church
- Completed: 1892
- Direction of façade: Southeast
- Pittsburgh Historic Designation
- Official name: Shrine of St. Anthony of Padua
- Type: Structure
- Designated: February 22, 1977
- Pittsburgh Landmark – PHLF
- Designated: 1968

Website
- saintanthonyschapel.org

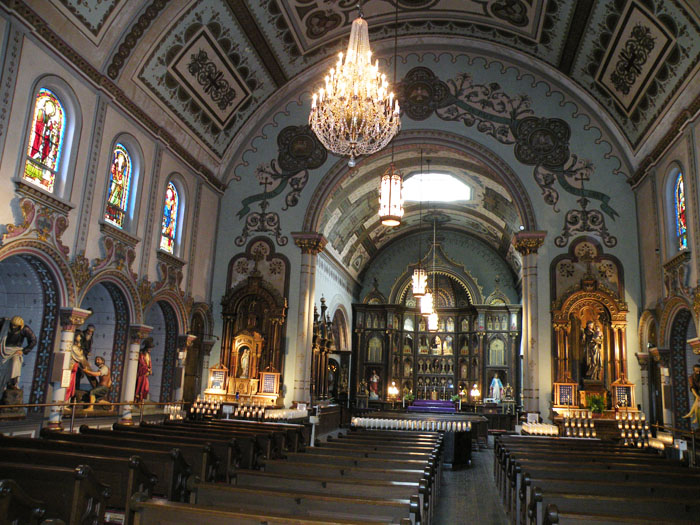
The interior of the chapel, as it appeared in 2010.

Saint Anthony's Chapel (styled in some parish and diocesan sources as Saint Anthony Chapel) is a Catholic chapel in the Troy Hill neighborhood of Pittsburgh, Pennsylvania. It belongs to the Roman Catholic Diocese of Pittsburgh and is notable for its vast collection of relics.

== History ==
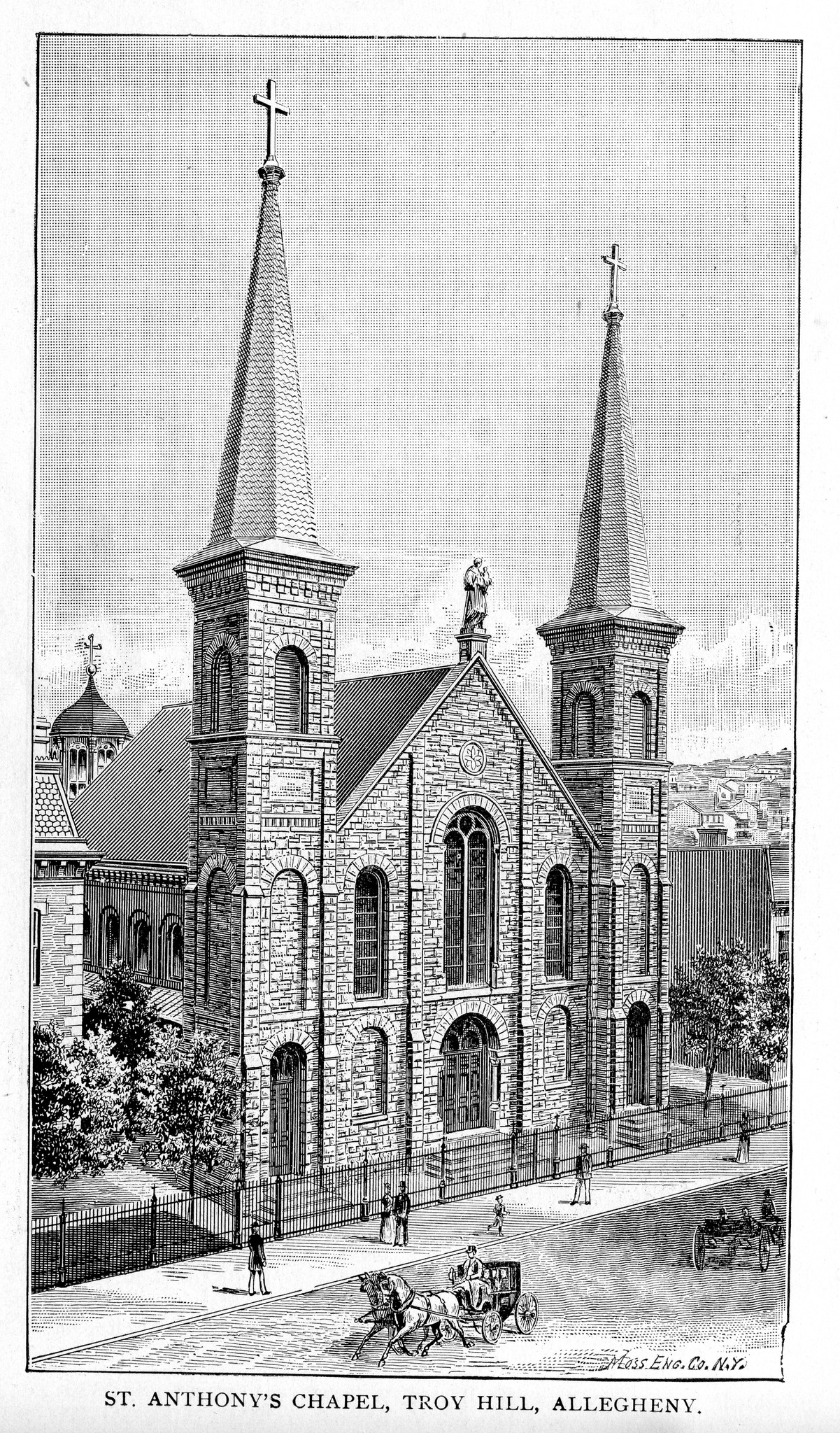
Engraving of St. Anthony's Chapel c. 1890, showing the twin spires and street activity in front of the church

=== Construction ===
Saint Anthony's Chapel was built under the direction of Father Suitbert Mollinger (1828–1892), pastor of Most Holy Name Parish in Troy Hill. Dedicated to Saint Anthony of Padua, the chapel was intended both as a place of worship and as a permanent home for the relics Father Mollinger gathered during repeated trips to Europe. Many of these acquisitions took place during periods of political upheaval, such as the Kulturkampf in Germany and the Italian unification, when monastic treasures were dispersed.

Mollinger initially housed his collection in his private residence. A larger chapel was originally planned as a joint project between Mollinger and his parishioners, with each contributing equally. When the parish declined to raise the necessary funds, Mollinger financed the entire construction himself using an inheritance from his family in Belgium. Work on the first structure began in 1882, and it was dedicated exactly a year later, on June 13, 1883. This building still forms the core of the chapel today, from the sanctuary to the central arch.

Within only a few years, Mollinger decided to expand the chapel. A nave was added extending toward Harpster Street, providing greater space for pilgrims and accommodating the installation of life-sized stations of the cross and stained-glass windows. The enlarged structure was rededicated on June 13, 1892, the feast day of Saint Anthony. Mollinger died two days later following surgery for a ruptured stomach.

Mollinger died intestate, and his heirs, exercising their rights to his estate, removed many valuables from the chapel, including crystal chandeliers, a black onyx altar, and candelabra. The parishioners of Most Holy Name subsequently purchased the chapel and its remaining contents for $30,000, a sum equivalent to equivalent to $1,075,000 in 2025 dollars.

=== Restoration ===
By the 1970s, the chapel had fallen into significant disrepair. In 1972 a parish committee was organized to raise funds for its restoration, with the approval of Bishop Vincent Leonard. Work began in April 1974. The restoration, which cost more than $260,000 ($1.38 million in 2025), was financed entirely through donations from parishioners and the wider public. Community advocates played an important role in the effort, particularly Troy Hill resident Mary Wohleber, who collected and sold roofing slates from the chapel for $5 apiece to support the restoration work.

The restoration addressed structural problems, repaired the roof and stained-glass windows, and thoroughly cleaned and refurbished the interior. The reliquaries, many of which had been darkened by neglect and smoke, were carefully restored, and new safeguards were introduced to protect the accompanying certificates of authenticity. An antique Czechoslovak crystal chandelier was sourced from a Byzantine Catholic parish in Charleroi and installed in the nave, and a skylight was installed to improve lighting. The chapel reopened in November 1977 with a thanksgiving Mass led by Bishop Leonard.

=== Ownership and administration ===
The chapel was originally built with private funds on land owned by Suitbert Mollinger. Following his death in 1892, the chapel and its remaining contents were purchased by parishioners of Most Holy Name of Jesus Parish, and the building has remained under parish ownership through the twentieth century.

In 2019 the Roman Catholic Diocese of Pittsburgh reorganized several parishes and shrines into a new grouping known as the Shrines of Pittsburgh, established to promote the sites as places of pilgrimage and prayer. Saint Anthony Chapel was included in this grouping along with St. Patrick and St. Stanislaus Kostka in the Strip District, Immaculate Heart of Mary in Polish Hill, and St. Nicholas in Millvale.

== Description ==
On one of the high hills of Western Pennsylvania, overlooking the Alleghany [sic] River, stands an exquisite little chapel—unique, wonderful, costly, magnificent. It was built by a devoted priest, out of his own inherited wealth, to do honor to the relics of the saints. It would read like an extract from the "Arabian Nights" did we venture a full description of this astonishing work of private devotion. We may safely say there is nothing like it in America. Thousands of precious relics, cased in crystal, silver, and gold, line the walls in incrustations of carving and gilt from the floor to the dome. Light streams from above, and the walls are hidden by actual mosaics of reliquaries in every shape the imagination could picture. Shrines are erected on every side, and life-size figures of martyred saints, of exquisite workmanship, lie beneath them, displaying the ghastly wounds of their martyrdom to the reverent wonder and devotion of the spectator. Urns and vials, centuries old, some of them, containing sacred relics taken from the Catacombs or the crypts of ancient shrines in the Old World, are here; the whole covered with costly plate-glass. The precious authentications of these relics, some crumbling with age, are enclosed in the fire-proof safes of this wonderful chapel. How these relics were obtained, and the account of their accumulation, would form a history of itself, not in keeping with the subject of this sketch.

— "Father Mollinger's Chapel," in The Ave Maria: A Catholic Family Magazine (1887)

=== Architecture, decoration and furnishing ===
The exterior facade of the chapel is marked by twin towers surmounted by stainless steel crosses plated in 24-karat gold leaf, each measuring ten and a half feet (3.2 m) in height including the base. An eight-foot (2.4 m) copper statue of Saint Anthony crowns the facade, replacing an earlier pewter figure that was destroyed by lightning. The chapel's bells were cast by the McShane Bell Foundry of Baltimore and installed in 1891. They include two large bells, named St. Anthony and St. Francis, and a smaller bell named St. Clare.

The interior of the chapel contains a set of polychrome life-sized linden wood statues of the Way of the Cross, imported from Munich and produced by the Royal Ecclesiastical Art Establishment of Mayer and Company. The figures, imported in the late nineteenth century, remained crated for several years before being installed in the enlarged nave. The stained-glass windows, depicting the twelve apostles and Saints Paul, Stephen, and Lawrence, were designed by the Royal Bavarian Art Institute and bear the trademark of Franz Xaver Zettler of Munich, dated 1890. The interior, in addition to its statuary and stained glass, is richly painted in a decorative scheme executed during the original period and refreshed in subsequent restorations.

Other furnishings include the original pews, made of birch, mahogany, and pine, later refinished to a uniform mahogany shade. The hand-carved confessionals at the rear of the chapel, with matching kneelers, were also restored during the twentieth century.

The organ, imported secondhand from Germany, was installed in 1892 and is older than the chapel itself. Originally a two-manual tracker-action instrument with twelve ranks of pipes, it was hand-pumped by lever and later connected to a water-powered mechanism. The instrument was rebuilt in 1955 with electro-pneumatic action, retaining many of the original European pipes. A further renovation incorporated a new all-electric console from the Klann Organ Company of Waynesboro, Virginia, expanding the instrument to nine ranks.

=== Relics ===
Today Saint Anthony Chapel houses over 5,000 relics. The size of its collection is often described as second only to that of the Vatican, though historian Katherine Lukaszewicz has suggested that the relic treasury of the Spanish crown at the Escorial may be larger.

The collection preserves portions of the physical remains, clothing, and personal effects of various saints, many of which are housed in reliquaries of crystal, silver, and gold. Most of the chapel's pieces are vouched for by ecclesiastical authentication documents, the oldest of which is dated August 12, 1716. In total, the chapel maintains more than 800 reliquary cases displayed in ornate settings that line the walls from floor to ceiling. The solid walnut cases that house the relic collection were produced by local German-American artisans Leo Beckert and Fritz Allzerman.

Prominent pieces in the collection include a thorn from the Crown of Thorns, the purported complete skeletal remains of a saint named Demetrius (housed beneath the altar with each bone wrapped in silk and adorned with imitation gems), the skulls of martyred saints named Macharius and Stephana, several of Saint Ursula's companions, and a saint named Theodore. The central relic of the collection is kept beneath a side altar to the right of the triumphal arch: a molar tooth of St. Anthony, claimed to be the only principal relic of the saint kept outside of Padua. Behind the altar is a setting of reliquaries containing relics from each of the saints named in the Roman Canon. Other relics include slivers of the True Cross and particles of what is described as the clothing of the Blessed Virgin Mary and Saint Joseph. Some relics are visible only at close range, while others are kept out of public view, such as a small fragment of the Last Supper table, which is housed within the mensa of the high altar.

Among the chapel's most notable objects is a reliquary crafted in Aachen in 1880 by August Witte. The piece, in the form of a monstrance, contains a particle of the True Cross at its center. Surrounding it are relics of John the Baptist, Mary Magdalene, St. Lawrence, St. Dionysius, St. Blaise, and St. Stephen, together with a fragment of the winding sheet of Christ. The outer rim holds relics of St. Anthony, St. Nicholas, St. Agnes, St. Barbara, St. Sebastian, St. Catherine, St. Cecilia, and St. Lambert. Silver medals depicting these saints are fixed to the reliquary's base, which is further ornamented with filigree and engraved decoration. The reliquary continues to be used during novena services in honor of St. Anthony of Padua, when it is presented for the blessing of the faithful.

== Chapel museum ==
A small museum and gift shop in a house across from the chapel displays memorabilia and belongings associated with Fr. Suitbert Mollinger, along with crutches left behind by individuals who reported healings at the chapel in the 19th century.
