= Todi Cathedral =

Catholic cathedral in Todi, Umbria, Italy

Coordinates: 42°46′59″N 12°24′22″E

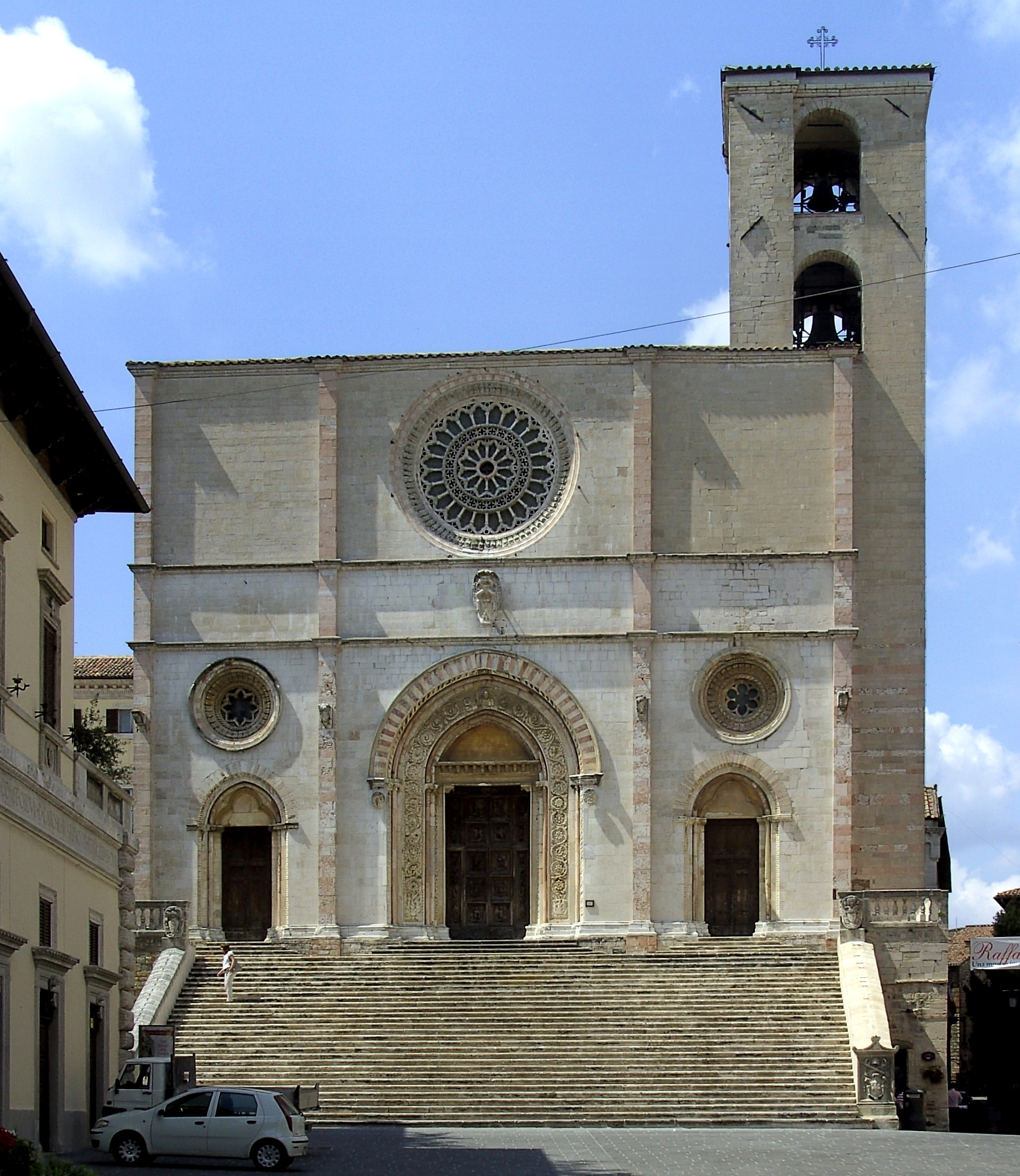
West front

Todi Cathedral (Italian: Duomo di Todi; Concattedrale della Santissima Annunziata) is a mainly Gothic-style Roman Catholic cathedral in Todi, Umbria, Italy, dedicated to the Annunciation of the Virgin Mary. It was formerly the seat of the bishops of Todi, and since 1986 has been a co-cathedral of the diocese of Orvieto-Todi.

== History ==
The cathedral stands on the site of a Roman edifice in the former Roman forum, in the present Piazza del Popolo in the centre of the city of Todi. Its early history is obscure. The earlier church here, believed to have been built around the year 1000, was almost completely destroyed by a fire in 1190. The reconstruction took centuries, in part due to an earthquake in 1246 and a collapse of the roof in 1322; the cathedral was finished only in the late-14th century. It has been refurbished and altered several times since then.

== Description ==
=== Exterior ===
The cathedral stands above two terraces at the top of a broad flight of steps. The main facade, faces Southwest, and dates from the 13th century but has been modified several times, most recently in the 16th century. The central rose window was begun in 1515 and completed under Bishop Biliotti between 1517 and 1523. The stained glass is not original, but is the result of 19th century restoration.

The central portal with a pointed arch, has a carved wooden double door of 1521 by Antonio Bencivenni consisting of four upper panels depicting the Annunciation, the Archangel Gabriel, Saint Peter and Saint Paul, and six lower panels added in 1639. The stone frame of the arch is sculpted with delicate spirals of fronds with either flowers, animals, or faces in the center. The keystone of the freize is a Christ blessing. To the east of the main nave rises the 13th century campanile; the base, like the Romanesque Eastern apse, is older than the facade; the final story on the tower was added only in the 19th century.

=== Interior ===
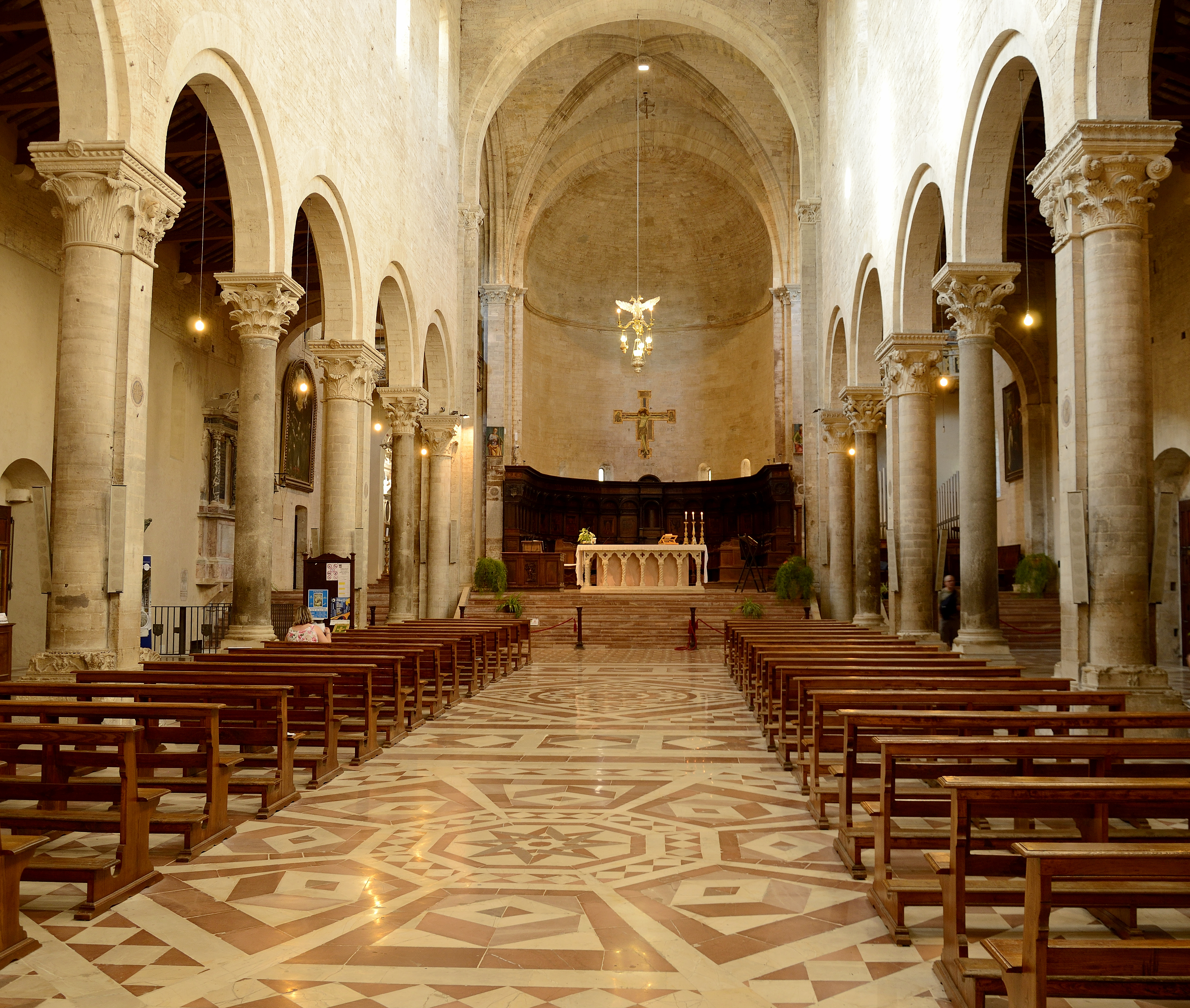
Cathedral interior looking east

The cathedral is built on a Latin cross plan. The nave is subdivided into three aisles, of which the central one is the widest and tallest, separated by two arcades of round arches supported by Corinthian columns. The main nave and side aisles are roofed with wooden beams, whereas the transept has groin vaulting.

At the entrance to the southern aisle is the font, made by Piero di Moricone from Lugano in 1507.

On the counterfaçade is a large fresco depicting the Last Judgment (1596) painted by Ferraù Fenzoni known as "Il Faenzone". Many episodes and figures, including that of the seated Christ, though more condensed in this space, they are derived from Michelangelo's fresco at the Sistine Chapel.

The wooden choir stalls are the work of Antonio Bencivenga and his son Sebastiano between 1521 and 1530.

In the apse is a crucifix painted on a panel, dating from the mid-13th century, while to the north of the presbytery is the Cesi Chapel, established by Bishop Angelo Cesi; the vault has frescoes of 1599 by Il Faenzone, who also created the painting on the chapel altar.

In the crypt are three sculptures previously on the west front, attributed to Giovanni Pisano and to "Il Rubeus".

== Gallery ==
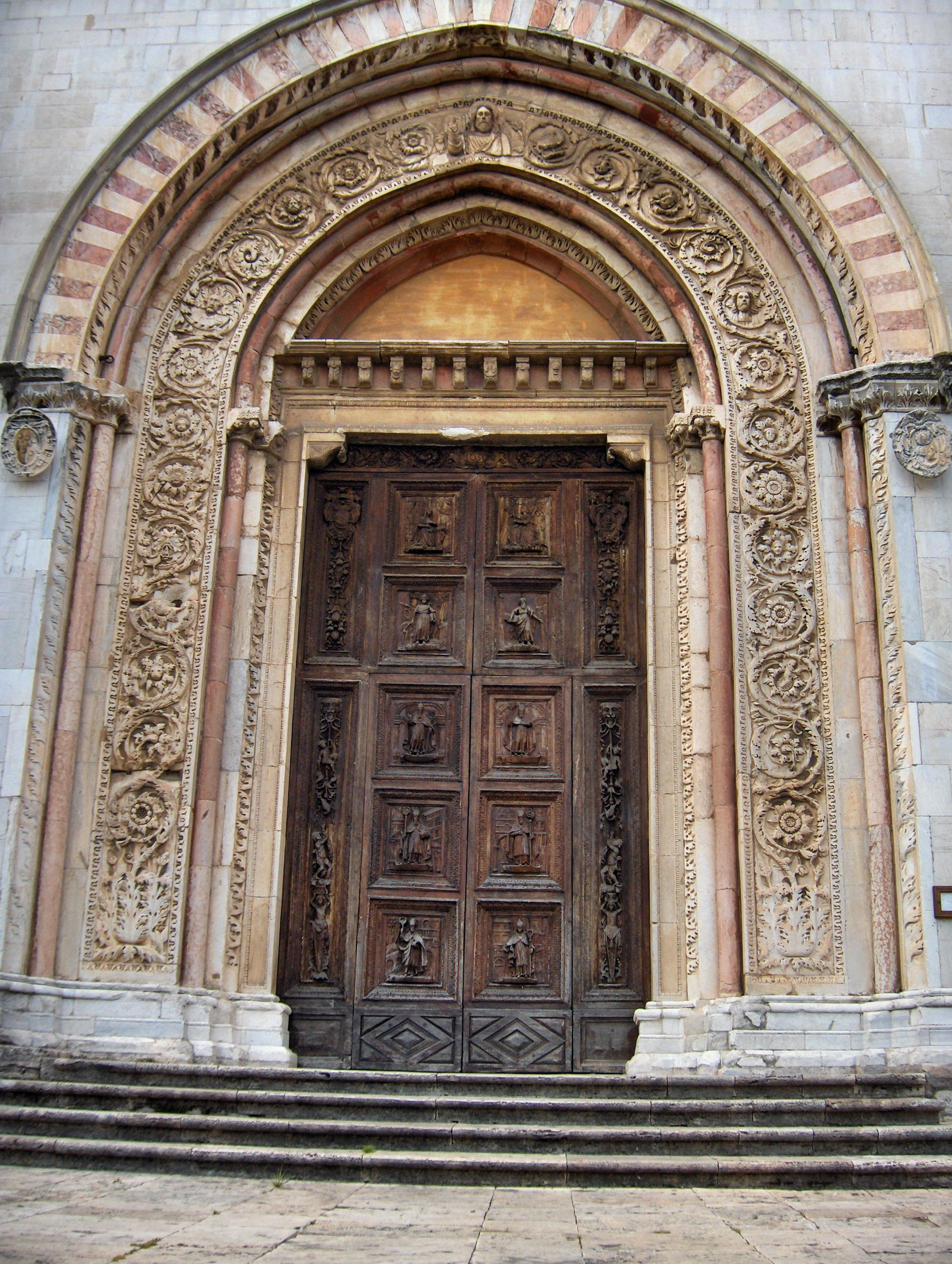
The main Gothic portal

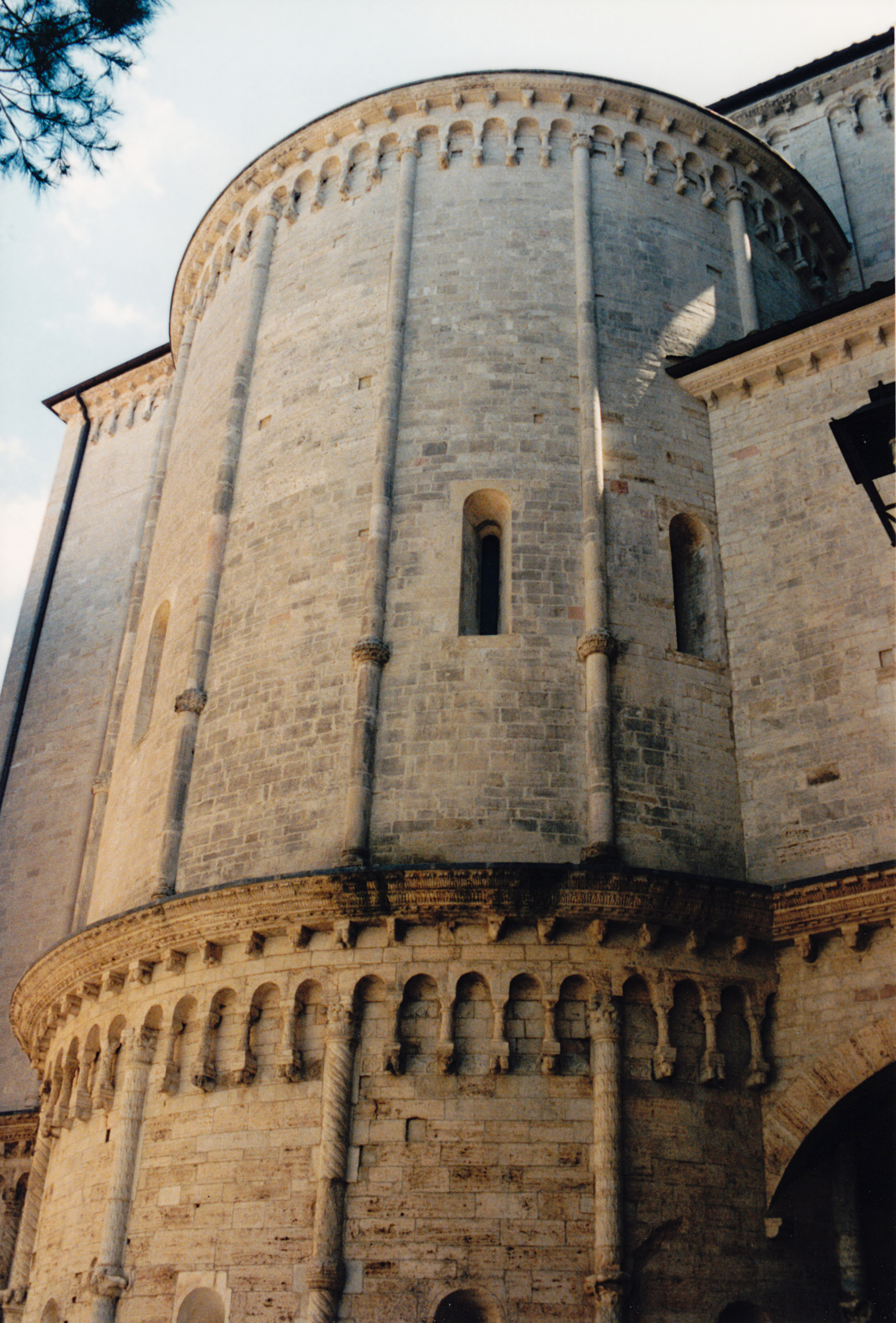
Exterior of the easter apse

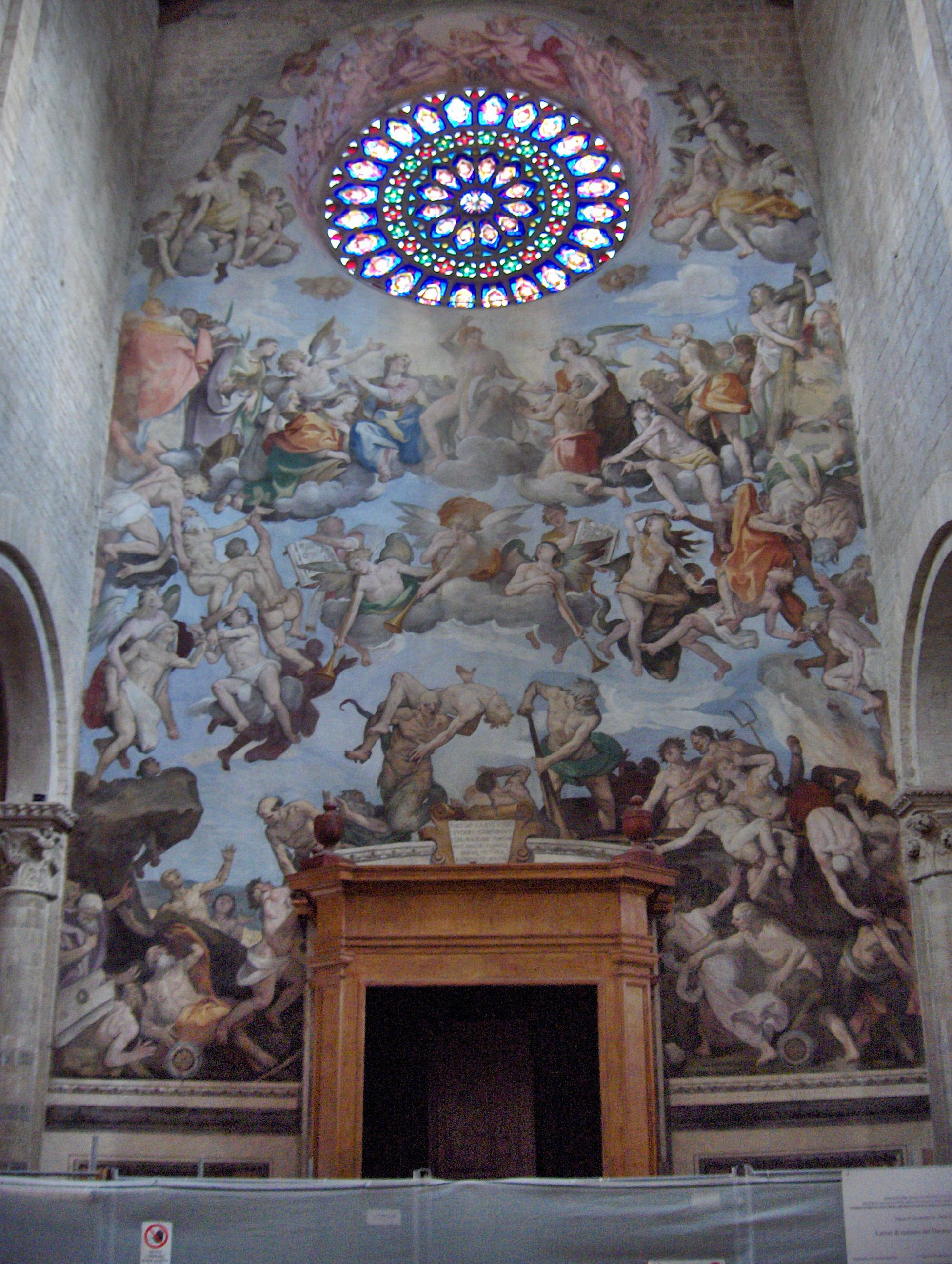
The Last Judgment (1594–99) by Ferraù Fenzoni

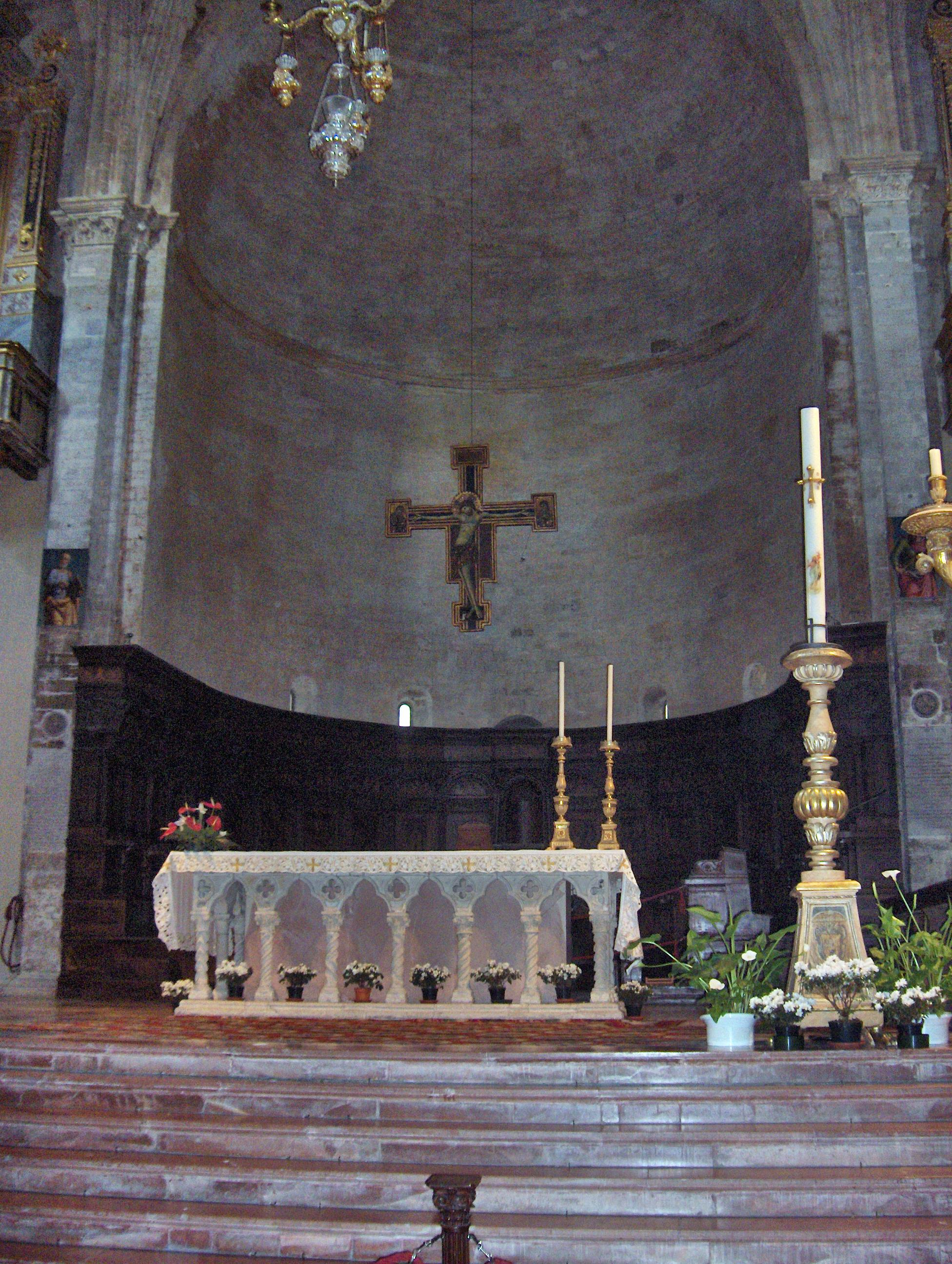
The high altar and the Crucifixion (13th century)

== Bibliography ==
- Prandi, Adriano, 1980: Ombrie romane, pp. 269–283. Zodiaque, Abbaye Sainte-Marie de la Pierre-Qui-Vire, Saint-Léger-Vauban
- Santini, Loretta, 1987: L'Ombrie, nouveau guide, p. 59. Éditions Plurigraf, Narni - Terni
- Touring Club Italiano, 2004: L'Italia: Umbria. Touring Club Italiano-La Biblioteca di Repubblica
