= Penn Brewery =

Brewery in Pittsburgh, Pennsylvania

Pennsylvania Brewing Company
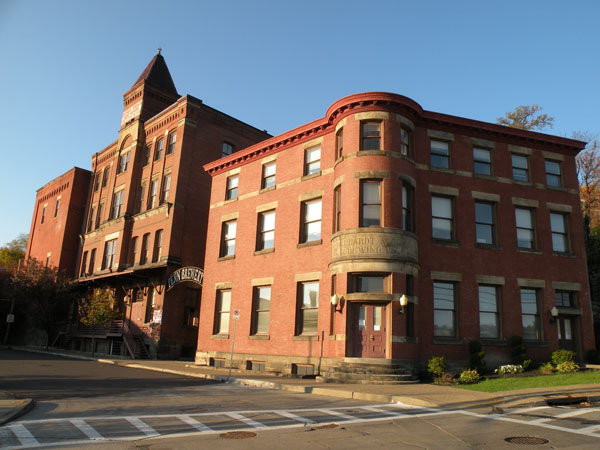
- Industry: Alcoholic beverage
- Founded: 1986
- Headquarters: Pittsburgh, Pennsylvania
- Products: Beer
- Eberhardt and Ober Brewery
- U.S. National Register of Historic Places
- Location within Pennsylvania
- Location: Troy Hill Rd. & Vinial St., Pittsburgh, Pennsylvania
- Coordinates: 40°27′26″N 79°59′29″W
- Area: 4 acres (1.6 ha)
- Built: 1883
- Architectural style: Classical Revival, Italianate, Romanesque
- NRHP reference No.: 87001984
- Added to NRHP: November 5, 1987
- Owner: Stefan Nitsch
- Website: pennbrew.com

Penn Brewery, also known as the Pennsylvania Brewing Company, is a brewery and restaurant in Pittsburgh, Pennsylvania. It was founded by Tom Pastorius in 1986, and is located at 800 Vinial Street in the Troy Hill neighborhood of Pittsburgh, on the site of the former Eberhardt and Ober Brewery (founded in 1848).

== History and restoration of Eberhardt and Ober Brewery building ==
Originally a contract brewing operation, Penn Brewery brewed its original and flagship product at the facilities of the Pittsburgh Brewing Company and then the Jones Brewing Company until 1989. Known as Penn Pilsner, Pastorius brewed the full bodied German-syle beer in strict accordance to the German Purity Law (Reinheitsgebot) of 1516. Penn Pilsner quickly gained in popularity among Pennsylvania beer drinkers, increasing the need for its own brewing facility. Pastorius also recognized the demand for authentic German cuisine in his hometown of Pittsburgh, Pennsylvania, spawning the idea of a "tied house", or brewery and restaurant under one roof, similar to the many beer halls he experienced while living in Germany for twelve years.

Prior to 1987, however, Pennsylvania law prohibited such a facility. Pastorius responded by successfully lobbying Pennsylvania legislators to change state law. In 1987 Pastorius, signed a lease to become the anchor tenant in the former Eberhardt & Ober Brewery that was being redeveloped by the Northside Civic Development Council. The brewery is located at 800 Vinial Street on the North Side of Pittsburgh. Three of the original E & O brewery buildings remain, the stock house (c. 1880-84), and office building standing on a side cut into the rock of Troy Hill. Pastorius hired German Brewmaster Alex Deml to oversee construction of the 30,000 barrel-a-year capacity brewing facility, which included custom built micro-brewery equipment imported from Germany.

On September 12, 1989, the Allegheny Brewpub (later renamed Penn Brewery) opened its doors, with dignitaries including Pittsburgh Mayor Sophie Masloff and Pennsylvania Governor Bob Casey tapping the first keg. The Pennsylvania Brewery occupied 16,000 sq. ft. On the first floor. The Northside Civic Development Council operated a business incubator In the other 36,000 sq. ft. of the property, offering low-rent and consultants for start-up companies.

In 2003, Wexford, PA, based Birchmere Capital LP purchased a controlling stake in Penn Brewery.

Founder Tom Pastorius died on September 6, 2012. Pastorius' ancestor, Franz Daniel Pastorius, founded Germantown, Pennsylvania in 1683.

=== Closure ===
On January 2, 2009, Birchmere ended beer production at the Vinial Street location and laid off 8 of the 10 brewery employees. All production was outsourced to the Lion Brewery in Wilkes-Barre, PA. The restaurant was scheduled to close February 28, 2009, but a last-minute agreement allowed it to remain at its current location for the next five years.

On August 19, 2009, Birchmere announced the indefinite closing of the Penn Brewery Restaurant.

=== Re-opening ===
On November 23, 2009, Penn Brewery issued a press announcement indicating that a small group of local investors, had acquired Penn Brewery from Birchmere Capital, under undisclosed terms, and that the original owner would be returning to lead a restart of brewing at the Vinial Street location, as well as an eventual reopening of the restaurant.

On December 8, 2009, brewing officially resumed at the E & O facility, with the first mashing occurring at 10:20 AM. December 30, 2009 at 4:00 PM marked the first beer tasting of the new era of Penn Brewery.

On December 30, 2009 the Penn Brewery Restaurant opened for a "sneak peek" preview of the beers. Festivities were open to the public and the response was incredible.

In February 2010 a new kegging line was installed, and on February 17, 2010, the first kegs of locally brewed Penn Brewery beer were released to wholesalers.

In March 2010 the Penn Brewery Restaurant started weekly "growler hours" every Friday from 4pm to 6pm. The public was given the opportunity to purchase pint drafts and half gallon growlers for home while construction continues on the kitchen. Varieties available on tap will vary based on latest brewings from Penn Brewery, but in general will include Penn Pilsner, Kaiser Pils, Penn Dark, and new Allegheny Pale Ale.

In 2012, Pittsburgh Magazine named it one of the favorite breweries in Pittsburgh.

In August 2022 the brewery was sold to local businessman Stefan Nitsch. Christopher Rudolph continues as head brewer, introducing new small batch brews each month.

In April 2026, the brewery filed for Chapter 11 bankruptcy protection.
