= H. J. Heinz Company complex =

Historic industrial complex in Pittsburgh

- H. J. Heinz Company; Heinz Lofts
- U.S. National Register of Historic Places
- Pittsburgh Landmark – PHLF
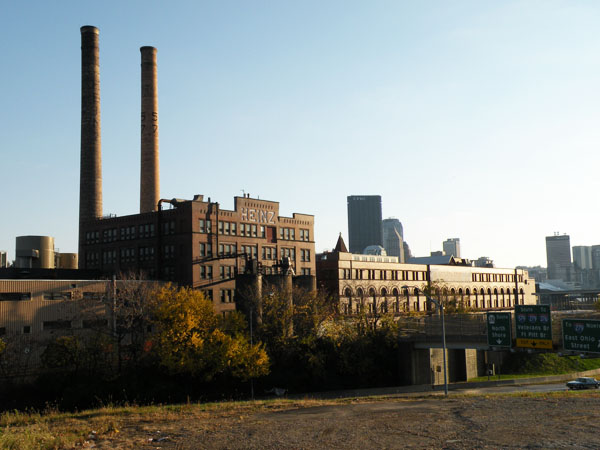
- Heinz complex seen from the north

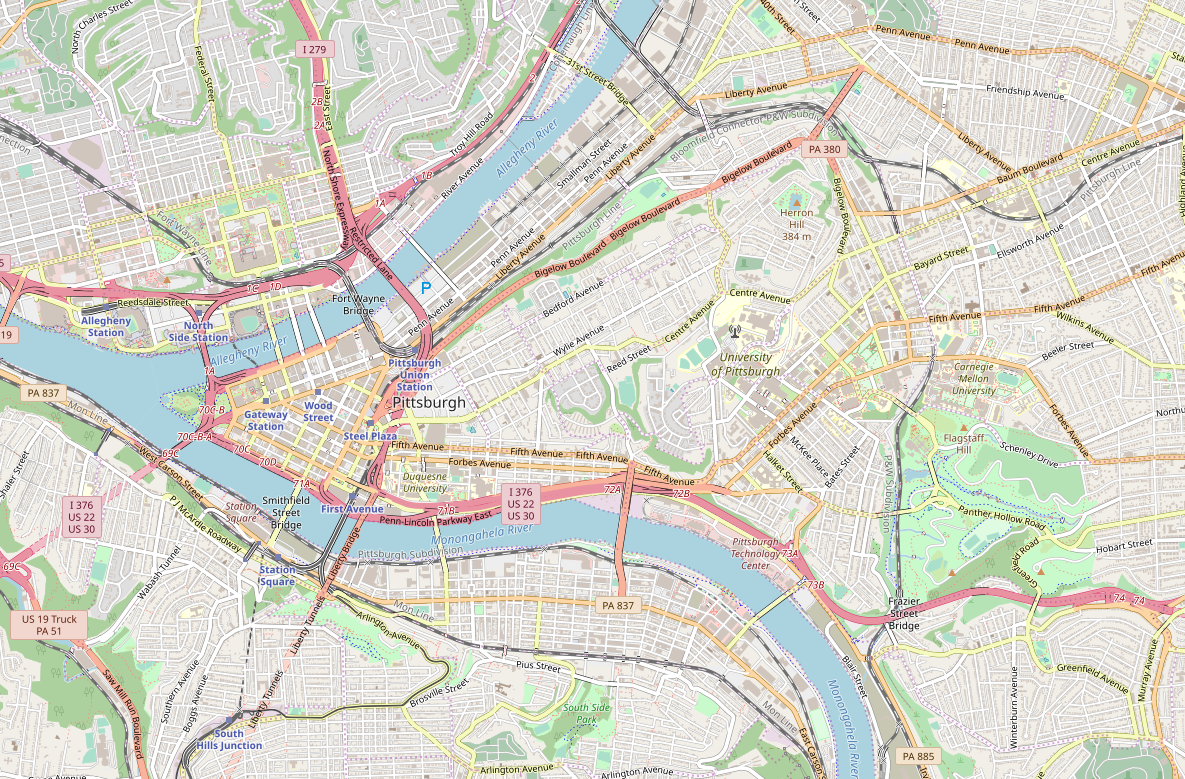
- Location within Downtown Pittsburgh
- Location: Roughly bounded by Chestnut Street, River Avenue, South Canal Street, Progress Street and Heinz modern Manufacturing Facilities, (Troy Hill), Pittsburgh, Pennsylvania
- Coordinates: 40°27′16″N 79°59′27″W
- Architectural style: Romanesque Revival, Beaux-Arts
- NRHP reference No.: 02000774

Significant dates
- Added to NRHP: July 10, 2002
- Designated PHLF: 2007

The H. J. Heinz Company complex, part of which is currently known as The Preserve at Heinz and Heinz Lofts, is a historic industrial complex in the Troy Hill neighborhood of Pittsburgh, Pennsylvania. The buildings were built by the H. J. Heinz Company from 1907 through 1958. The complex is listed on the National Register of Historic Places (NRHP) and five of the buildings are listed as a Pittsburgh History and Landmarks Foundation Historic Landmark.

== Buildings ==
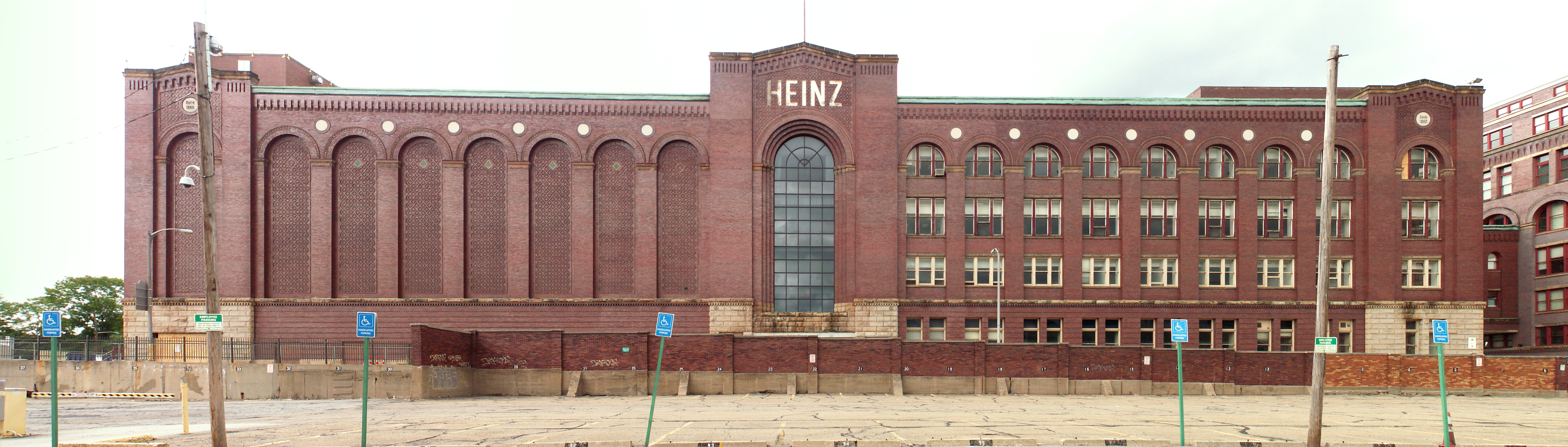
The Service and Auditorium Building, built in 1930 now The Preserve at Heinz apartment community.

The complex contains eleven buildings, nine of which are contributing buildings of the NRHP listing. The contributing buildings, built between 1907 and 1937, are the Administration Building (1907), Bean Building (1913), Power Building (1914), Shipping Building (1915), Meat Building (1923), Cereal Building (1926), Reservoir Building (1927), Service and Auditorium Building (1930), and the Administration Annex (1937). The Administration Building is built of terra cotta, stone, and brick in the Beaux-Arts style and its annex is built of blond brick in the Commercial style. All the other contributing buildings are built of red brick and stone in the Romanesque Revival style. The two non-contributing buildings in the complex are the Riley Research Building — an International style building from 1958 — and a guard booth.

== History ==
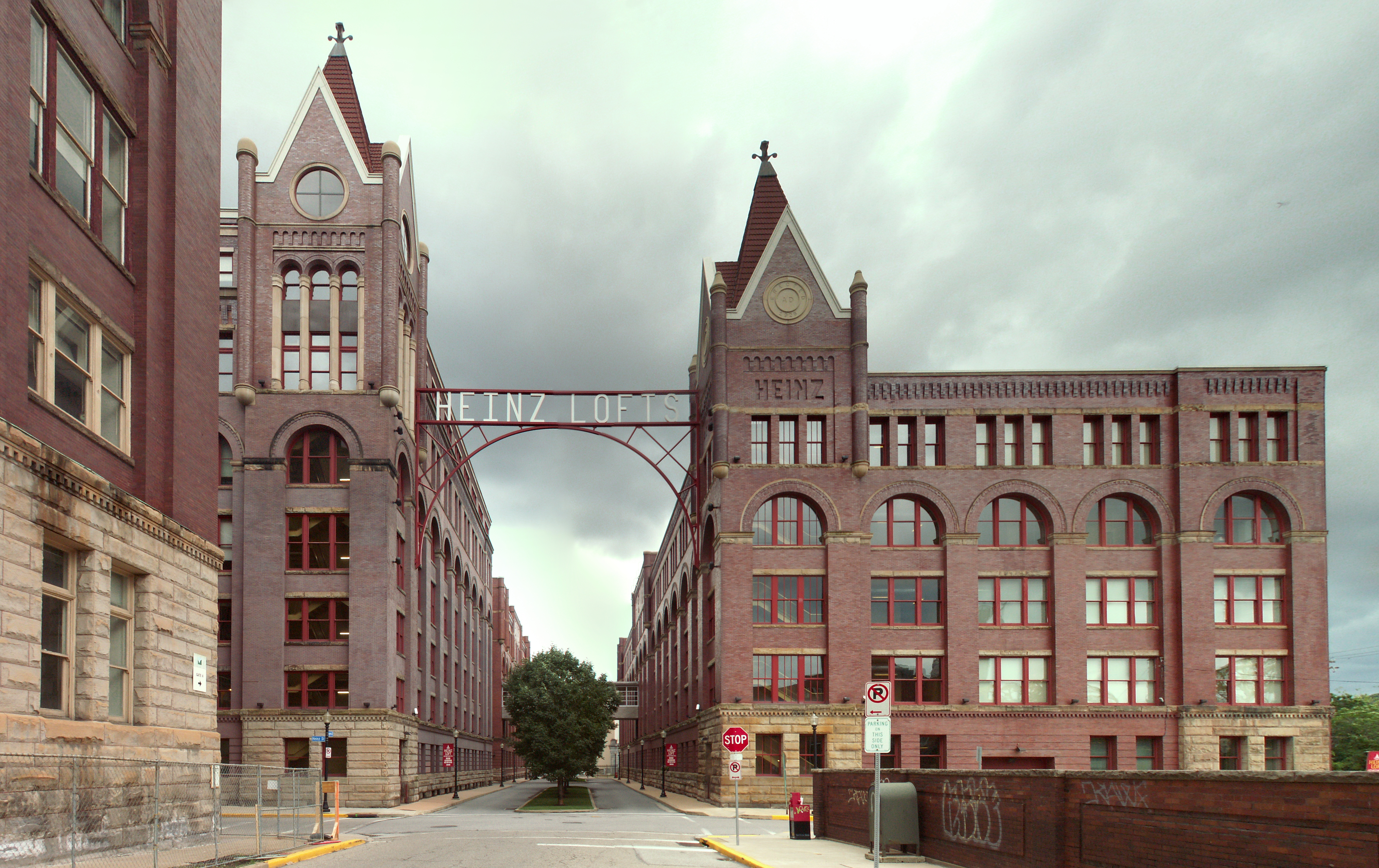
From left to right, the Service, Meat, and Cereal Buildings; a sign reading "HEINZ LOFTS" connects Meat and Cereal

The Heinz Company was founded in 1876 and leased several buildings until 1890. In 1884, German-American Henry J. Heinz purchased several lots on the north bank of the Allegheny River in Pittsburgh. From 1888 through 1906, approximately twenty buildings were built or purchased, mostly of wood and beam construction. From 1906 through 1930, new buildings in the complex were made of steel and concrete instead of wood. The buildings from this period reflected Henry Heinz's Romanesque Revival influence, in contrast with the modern industrial style at the time, even after his death in 1919.

Through the 1930s and 1940s, many surrounding houses and small commercial buildings were demolished to accommodate parking lots for the plant. In the 1950s, several of the Romanesque Revival buildings were demolished and new buildings were built in modern industrial and International style. From 1999 to 2001, Heinz built a 70,000-square-foot (6,500 m^{2}) warehouse on the east side and moved its headquarters to downtown Pittsburgh.

By 2001, many of the historic buildings had been vacant for five to eight years. Heinz had no long-term plans for the buildings and sold them to a residential developer. On July 10, 2002, the historic complex was listed on the National Register of Historic Places as the "H.J. Heinz Company". In 2005, the complex was documented as part of the Historic American Engineering Record.

In 2005, the Cereal, Bean, Meat, Reservoir and Shipping Buildings opened as Heinz Lofts. The Shipping Building houses a parking garage and the other four house apartments. In 2007, the five buildings of the Heinz Lofts were listed as a Pittsburgh History and Landmarks Foundation Historic Landmark. In 2014, the former Heinz Employee Service Building and Auditorium was converted into residential apartments and reopened as Heinz at 950 North Shore. In 2024, the property was sold and subsequently renamed The Preserve at Heinz. The building currently consists of 151 apartment units featuring 56 unique floor plans. In 2016, a different residential developer purchased the Administration Building, the Administration Annex, and the Riley Research Building. There was a plan to convert to apartments, but it never came to fruition.

== See also ==
- National Register of Historic Places listings in Pittsburgh, Pennsylvania

== Notes ==
=== Bibliography ===
- Borland, Karen; Wellman, Diana (July 10, 2002). "National Register of Historic Places Inventory/Nomination: Heinz, H.J., Company" (pdf). National Archives Catalog.
