= Troy Hill (Pittsburgh) =

- Neighborhood of Pittsburgh
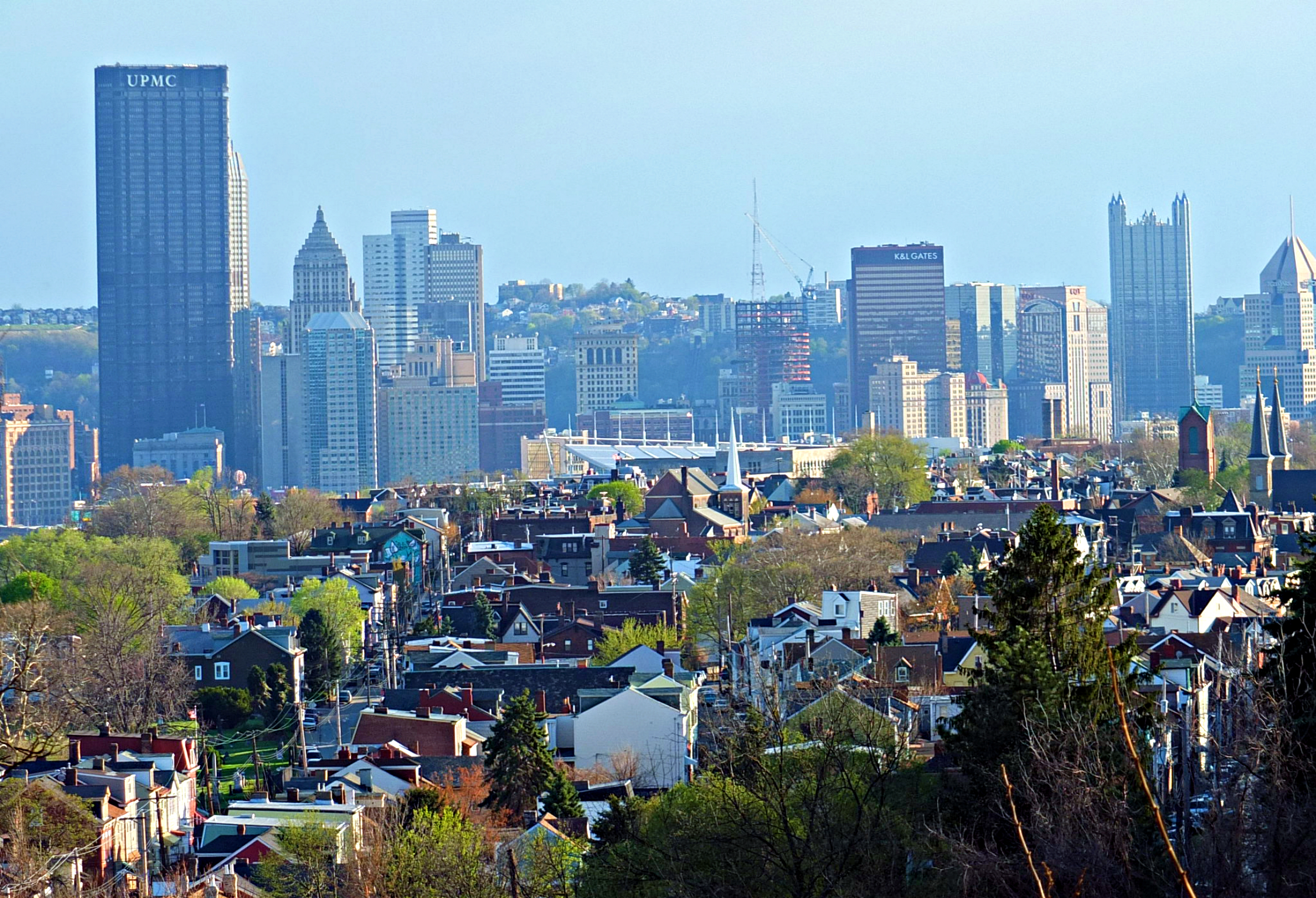
- View of Troy Hill from North East April 2014

- Coordinates: 40.47°N 79.98°W
- Country: United States
- State: Pennsylvania
- County: Allegheny County
- City: Pittsburgh

Area
  - Total: 0.46 sq mi (1.2 km^{2})

Population (2010)
  - Total: 2,714
  - Density: 5,900/sq mi (2,300/km^{2})
- ZIP Code: 15212

Troy Hill is a neighborhood on the North Side of Pittsburgh, Pennsylvania, situated on a plateau above the Allegheny River. It has the ZIP Code 15212 and is represented on Pittsburgh City Council as part of District 1.

== History ==
Troy Hill was originally part of the Reserve Tract north of the Allegheny River. The settlement was known as the "Village of New Troy" by the early 19th century. The name derived from an early property owner, Elizabeth Seymore, who was from Troy, New York. Plans for the development of New Troy were made in 1833. German immigrants increasingly settled on the hillside during the 19th century, remaining near employment in the mills and breweries along the Allegheny River. In 1842, the German Catholic congregation of St. Philomena established a cemetery and chapel in New Troy. By 1866, about 100 families lived in Troy Hill, most of them German or Czech. The neighborhood's German and eastern European settlement was also reflected in street names such as Liedertafel and Straubs.

The riverfront below Troy Hill, together with Herr's Island, became part of the borough of Duquesne, which was formed from Reserve Township in 1849. In 1868, part of Duquesne was incorporated into the new borough of Millvale, while the remainder was annexed by the city of Allegheny. The portion of Troy Hill north of Lowrie Street, however, remained in Reserve Township until 1877, when it was annexed by Allegheny and Troy Hill became the city's 13th Ward. When Allegheny was annexed by Pittsburgh in 1907, Troy Hill became part of Pittsburgh's 24th Ward.

Industrial development contributed to the neighborhood's growth during the latter half of the 19th century. Employees of the Pennsylvania Railroad settled in Troy Hill, while William Eberhardt and John Ober, both neighborhood residents, employed local workers at their nearby brewery. The paving of Troy Hill Road and economic expansion increased the number of families in the neighborhood to more than 200. Troy Hill and neighboring Mount Troy also retained an agricultural economy, as residents raised lettuce, spinach, cabbage, and other produce for sale at markets in the city below. Shops and stores subsequently opened within Troy Hill itself.

Religious and social institutions developed as the population increased. Most Holy Name of Jesus Roman Catholic Church and its parish school were established in 1868. Saint Anthony's Chapel, built in 1880, became known for its collection of Christian relics. German social organizations included the Liedertafel, the Troy Hill Männerchor, St. Anthony's Lyceum, and the Deutscher Unterstützungsbund. A Turnverein was also organized, and Turner Hall was built in 1890.

Public education in the neighborhood began in 1836, when a one-room brick schoolhouse known as Mount Troy School No. 1 was built in New Troy. The building was sold in 1860 and replaced by a two-room brick schoolhouse at the corner of what are now Claim and Hatteras streets. Two additional rooms were added in 1874 as enrollment increased. After Troy Hill became part of Allegheny's school system, the school was replaced in the 1880s. That building was in turn replaced by the Troy Hill School in 1907. The school later closed and was demolished, and its site became a community park.

Until 1959, the neighborhood was served by the 4 Troy Hill streetcar route operated by Pittsburgh Railways.

== Geography ==
=== Topography ===
Troy Hill occupies a plateau above the Allegheny River, bounded by steep slopes descending toward Spring Garden Avenue to the north, Vinial Street to the west, and East Ohio Street to the south. The cliffs drop approximately 150 feet (46 m) in places. The neighborhood is approximately 3 kilometers (1.9 mi) long from Vinial Street to the end of Lowrie Street and about 1 kilometer (0.62 mi) wide from Wicklines Lane to Herrs Island.

=== Historic areas ===
Although "Troy Hill" generally refers to the historically German neighborhood atop the plateau, the neighborhood's boundaries also encompass the narrow river plain between the plateau and the Allegheny River, formerly part of the Borough of Duquesne. Before the expansion of Pennsylvania Route 28, part of this riverfront was a Croatian-American neighborhood settled by immigrants from Jastrebarsko. Residents called the area "Mala Jaska" and established St. Nicholas Parish.

The western portion of the Troy Hill plateau was historically known as "Bohemian Hill". Czech immigrants settled there beginning in the 1890s, forming a community that extended down the hillside toward St. Wenceslaus Catholic Church on Progress Street. A Czech Protestant congregation established Bethlehem Chapel on the western edge of the neighborhood in 1901 and replaced it in 1908 with the First Bohemian Presbyterian Church, later renamed Troy Hill Presbyterian Church.

=== Adjacent neighborhoods ===
Troy Hill borders the Pittsburgh neighborhoods of Spring Garden to the north and northwest, East Allegheny to the west, and North Shore to the southwest. It also borders Reserve Township to the north-northwest and the borough of Millvale to the northeast. Across the Allegheny River, Troy Hill is adjacent to the Strip District, with a direct connection by the 31st Street Bridge.

=== City steps ===
Troy Hill has 11 distinct flights of city steps, which connect the hilltop neighborhood with public transportation and the East Ohio Street corridor.

== Arts and culture ==
Beginning in 2013, art collector Evan Mirapaul commissioned a series of whole-house art installations in Troy Hill known as the Troy Hill Art Houses. The first two were La Hütte Royal, created by German artist Thorsten Brinkmann, and Kunzhaus, by Polish artist Robert Kuśmirowski. A third installation, Darkhouse Lighthouse, by Lenka Clayton and Phillip Andrew Lewis, opened to the public in 2022. The fourth installation, Mrs. Christopher's House, by conceptual artist Mark Dion, opened in 2024.

Clayton and Lewis also created Gallery Closed, an installation in the former Troy Hill Incline building that opened in 2021. The gallery presents work through windows visible from the street while the interior remains closed to visitors.

Troy Hill has also been used as a filming location for several feature films, including Hoffa (1992), Innocent Blood (1992), Striking Distance (1993), and Adventureland (2009).

== Gallery ==
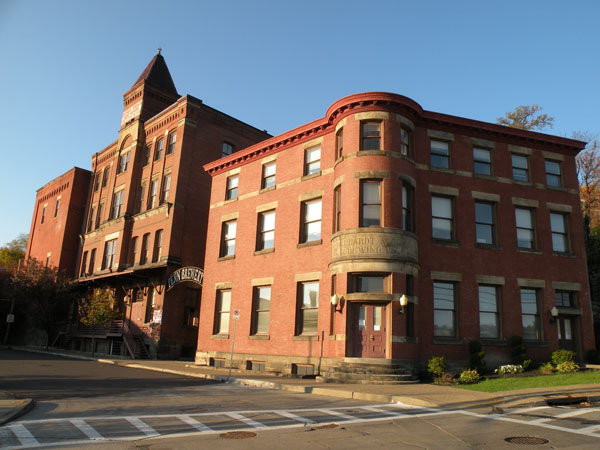
Eberhardt and Ober Brewery (now part of the Penn Brewery complex), founded in 1848. Buildings shown here circa 1880.

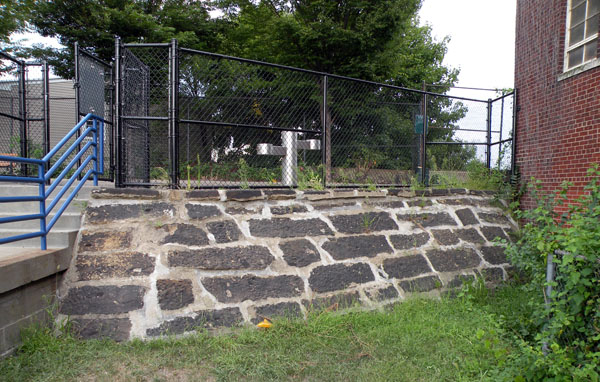
A remnant of the stone wall of the Allegheny Reservoir, located by Cowley Spray Park at the Troy Hill Playground, built 1848.

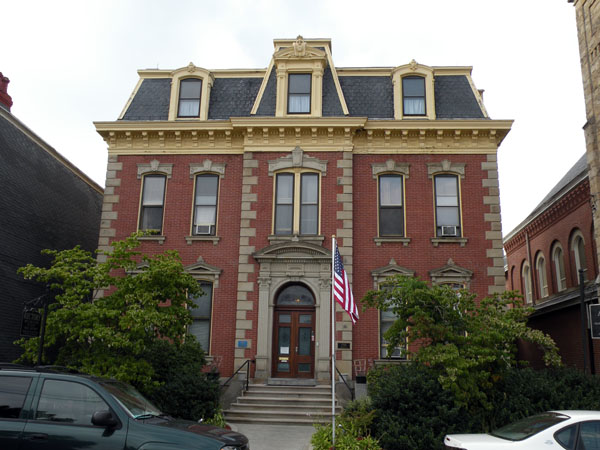
Most Holy Name of Jesus Rectory, built around 1875, at 1700 Harpster Street.

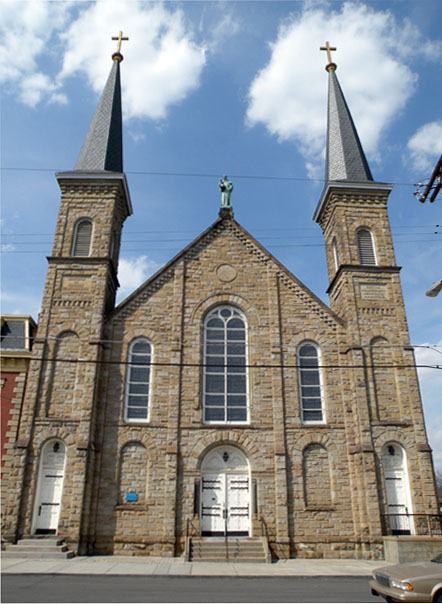
Saint Anthony's Chapel, built in 1880, at 1700 Harpster Street. About five thousand relics are housed in the chapel, making it the largest collection of relics outside the Vatican.

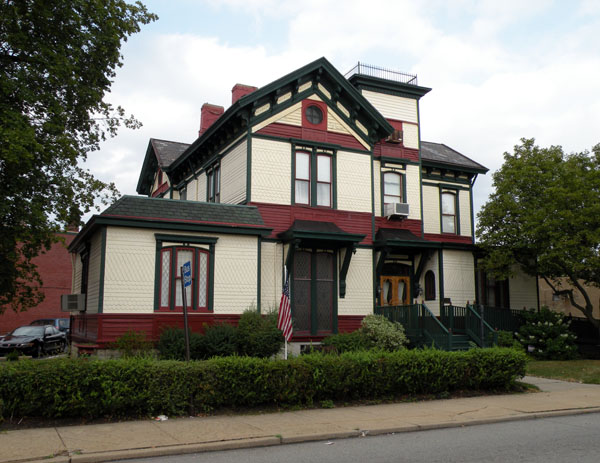
The Ober-Guehl House, built around 1877, at 1501 Lowrie Street.

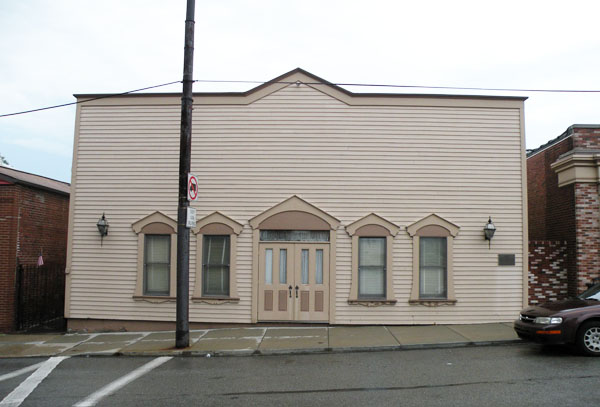
Former Troy Hill Incline Station, built in 1887, at 1733 Lowrie Street.

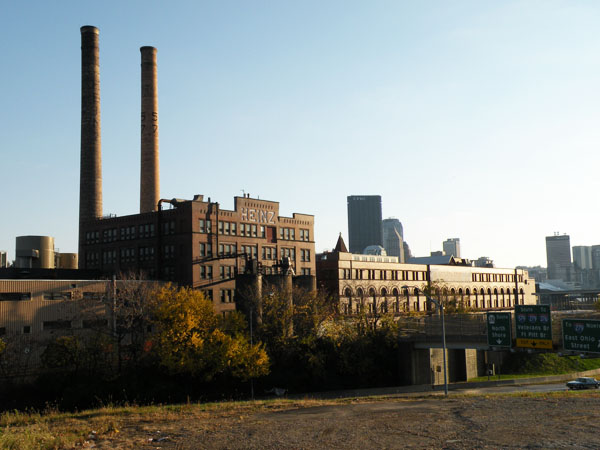
H. J. Heinz Company, in the Troy Hill neighborhood of Pittsburgh, PA, since 1890.

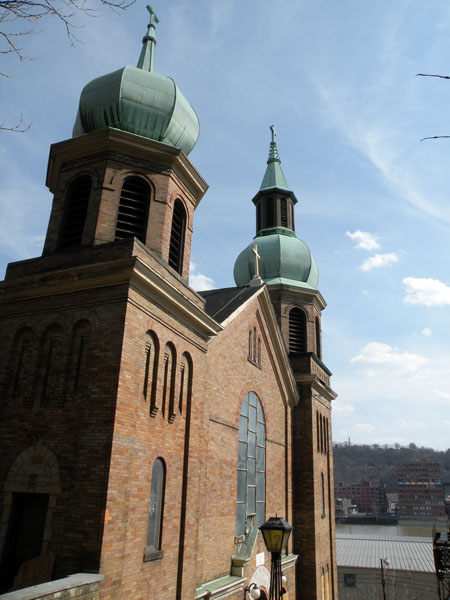
Saint Nicholas Croatian Catholic Church, built from 1900 to 1904, at 1326 East Ohio Street. The church was established in 1894, and is the site of the first Croatian Catholic parish in the United States. It was demolished in 2013 to make room for the expansion of Route 28.

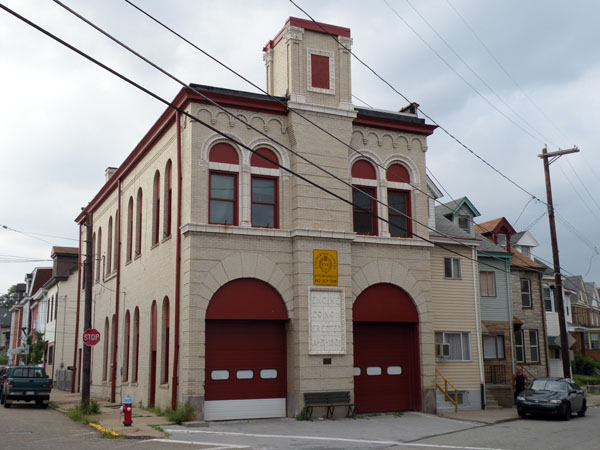
Troy Hill Fire Station #39, built in 1901, at the corner of Ley and Froman Streets.

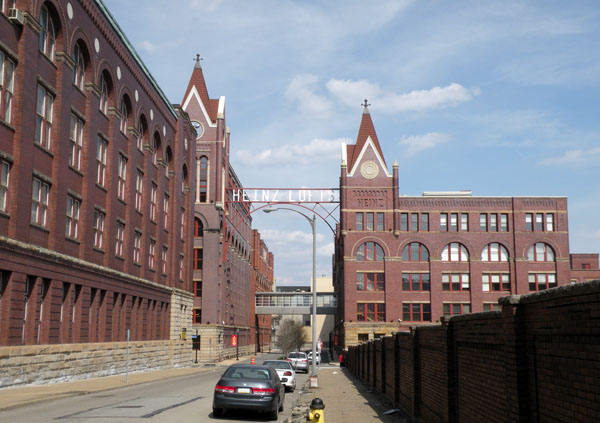
Heinz Lofts, built from 1913 to 1927, at 300 Heinz Street.

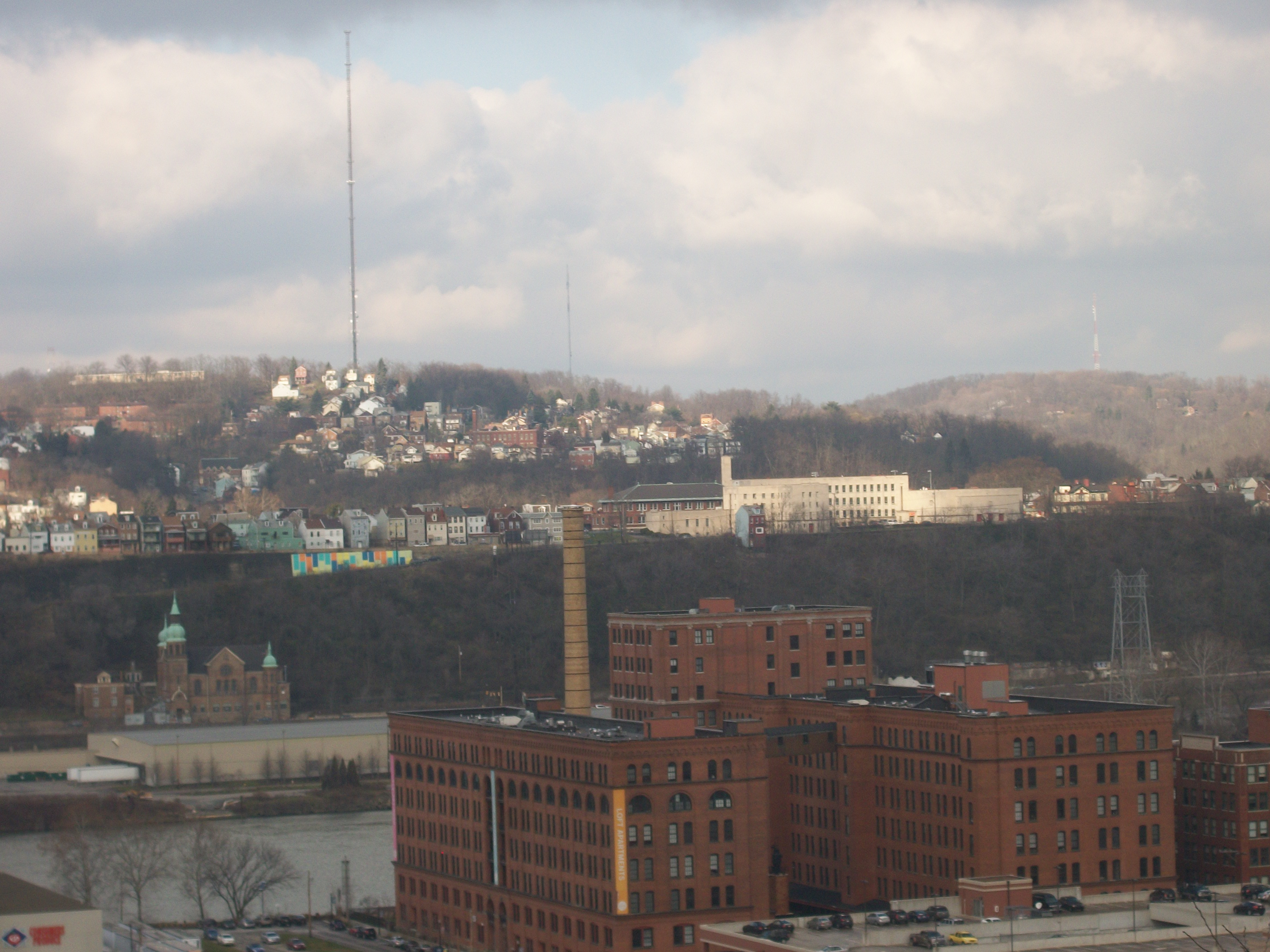
A view of Troy Hill (center) with Spring Hill in the background and The Cork Factory lofts in the Strip District in the foreground.

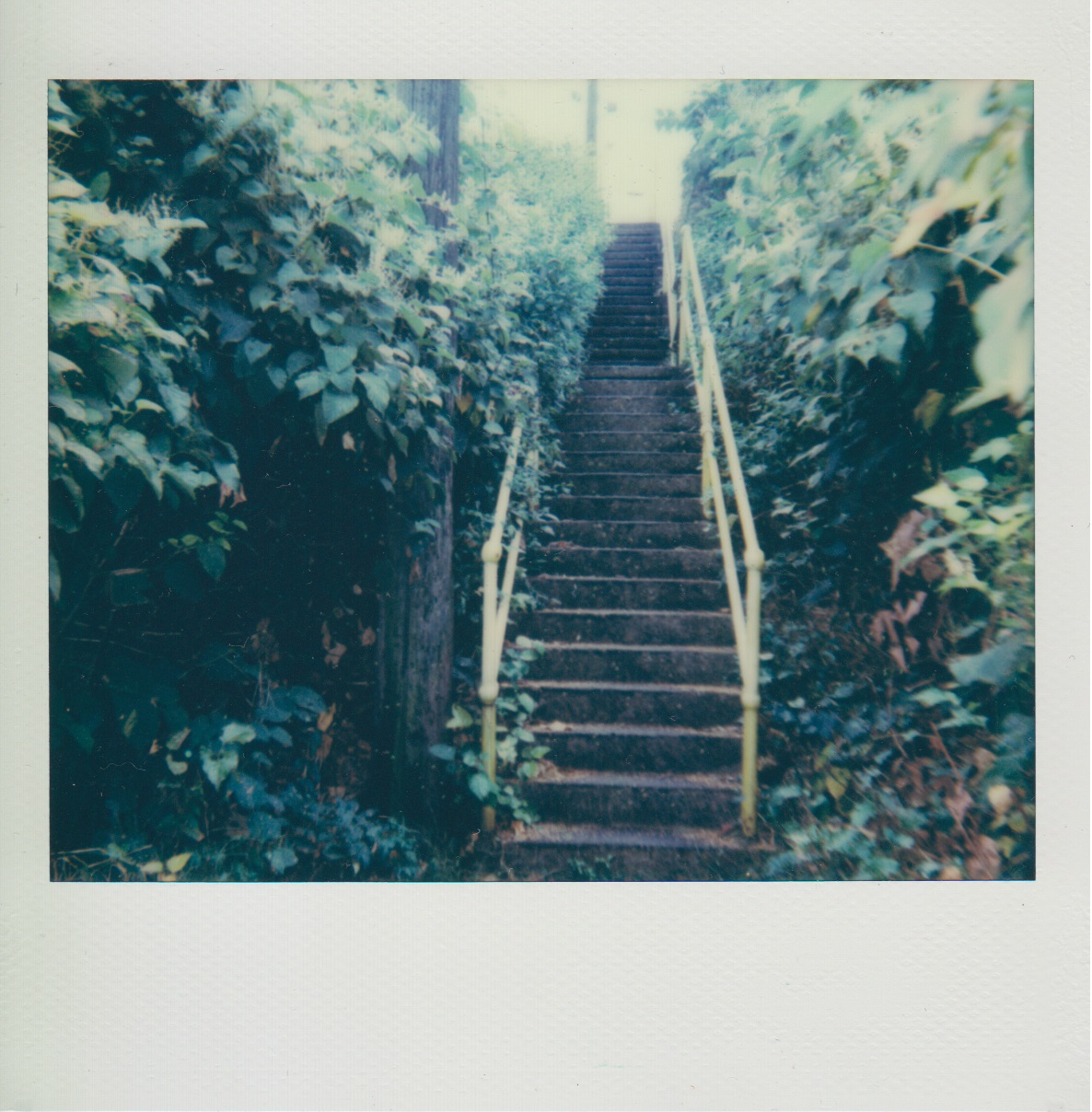
The Purse Way city steps are one of many public flights that connect pedestrians to Spring Garden.

== See also ==
- List of Pittsburgh neighborhoods
