= List of churches in the Diocese of Pittsburgh =

This is a list of current and former churches in the Diocese of Pittsburgh. The cathedral church of the diocese is the Cathedral of Saint Paul. The diocese is divided into two administrative vicariates.

Former churches are highlighted in gray.

== North Vicariate ==
Name	Image	Location	Parish	Description/Notes
All Saints		19 Wilson St., Etna	All Saints (1902–2021); St. Matthew (2021–)	
Annunciation		2601 Norwood Ave., Perry South, Pittsburgh	Annunciation (1893–1993); Incarnation of the Lord (1993–2020); Our Lady of Mount Carmel (2020–)	Closed in 2001
Ascension		1600 Metropolitan St., Chateau, Pittsburgh		Closed in 1962
Assumption of the Blessed Virgin Mary		45 North Sprague Ave., Bellevue	Assumption of the Blessed Virgin Mary (1903–2022); Regina Coeli (2022–)	
Cathedral of St. Paul		5th Ave. and Craig St., Oakland, Pittsburgh	St. Paul (1834–1843); St. Paul Cathedral (1843–)	
Christ the Divine Teacher		116 Thorndale Dr., Beaver Falls		
Corpus Christi		1550 Lincoln Ave., Lincoln–Lemington–Belmar, Pittsburgh	Corpus Christi (1903–1992); St. Charles Lwanga (1992–2020); St. Mary Magdalene (2020–)	Closed in 1992
Epiphany		184 Washington Pl., Uptown, Pittsburgh	Epiphany (1902–2020); Divine Mercy(2020–)	
Good Samaritan		725 Glenwood Ave., Ambridge		Parish is now part of Saint Luke the Evangelist Parish
Holy Family (Creighton)		787 Freeport Rd., Creighton		Part of Guardian Angels Parish
Holy Family (Lawrenceville)		250 44th St., Lawrenceville, Pittsburgh	Holy Family (1902–1993); Our Lady of Angels (1993–2024); St. Pio of Pietrelcina (2024–)	Closed in 2008
Holy Family (New Brighton)		521 7th Ave., New Brighton		Part of Our Lady of the Valley Parish.
Holy Martyrs		353 West 9th Ave., Tarentum		Closed in 2022. Part of Guardian Angels Parish.
Holy Redeemer (Purification of the Blessed Virgin Mary)		415 Fourth St., Ellwood City	Purification of the Blessed Virgin Mary (1916–2000); Holy Redeemer (2000–2022); Divine Grace (2022–)	
Holy Rosary		Homewood, Pittsburgh	Holy Rosary (1893–1992); St. Charles Lwanga (1992–2020); St. Mary Magdalene (2020–)	Closed
Holy Sepulcher		1304 E Cruikshank Rd., Butler		
Holy Spirit (St. Anthony)		608 Farragut St., Millvale	St. Anthony (1886–1994); Holy Spirit (1994–2021); St. Matthew (2021–)	
Immaculate Conception		300 Edmond St., Bloomfield, Pittsburgh	Immaculate Conception (1905–2001); Immaculate Conception–St. Joseph (2001–2012); St. Maria Goretti (2012–2024); St. Pio of Pietrelcina (2024–)	Closed in 2020
Immaculate Heart of Mary		3058 Brereton St., Polish Hill, Pittsburgh		Personal parish.
Incarnation of the Lord (Nativity of Our Lord)		4071 Franklin Rd., Perry North, Pittsburgh	Nativity of Our Lord (1916–1993); Incarnation of the Lord (1993–2020); Our Lady of Mount Carmel (2020–)	
Madonna of Jerusalem		9th St. and Clay St., Sharpsburg		Was part of St. Juan Diego Parish. Now part of Christ the King Parish.
Mater Dolorosa		409 N Main St., Chicora		Part of St. Clare of Assisi Parish.
Most Blessed Sacrament		800 Montana Ave., Natrona Heights		Part of Guardian Angels Parish.
Most Holy Name of Jesus		Claim and Harpster St., Troy Hill, Pittsburgh		Part of the Shrines of Pittsburgh
Mother of Good Counsel		7705 Bennett St., Homewood, Pittsburgh	Mother of Good Counsel (1907–1992); St. Charles Lwanga (1992–2020); St. Mary Magdalene (2020–)	
Newman Center (Slippery Rock University)		342 Normal Ave., Slippery Rock		Part of St. Faustina Parish.
Our Lady of Fatima		2270 Brodhead Rd., Aliquippa		Part of Mary, Queen of Saints Parish
Our Lady Help of Christians		6513 Meadow St., Larimer, Pittsburgh	Our Lady Help of Christians (1898–1992); St. Charles Lwanga (1992–2020); St. Mary Magdalene (2020–)	Closed in 1992, later demolished
Our Lady of the Most Blessed Sacrament		108 Madonna St., East Hills, Pittsburgh	Our Lady of the Most Blessed Sacrament (1910–1992); St. Charles Lwanga (1992–2020); St. Mary Magdalene (2020–)	Closed in 1996
Our Lady of Loreto		1904 Pioneer Avenue., Brookline, Pittsburgh		Closed in 2020. Parish is now part of St. Teresa of Kolkata Parish.
Our Lady of Peace		1000 3rd Ave., Conway		
Our Lady of Perpetual Help		10th & Carolina St., Natrona Heights		Closed in 2022. Part of Guardian Angels Parish.
Our Lady of Victory		1319 Low Grade Rd., Harwick		Part of Guardian Angels Parish.
Risen Lord (St. Francis Xavier)		3250 California Ave., Marshall-Shadeland, Pittsburgh		St. Francis Xavier Parish (1894–1993), Risen Lord Parish (1993–2019), Most Precious Blood of Jesus Parish (personal parish) (2019–).
Sacred Heart (Shadyside)		310 Shady Ave., Shadyside, Pittsburgh		Part of St. Jude Parish.
Sacred Heart (Emsworth)		154 Orchard Ave., Emsworth	Sacred Heart (1891–2022); Regina Coeli (2022–)	
St. Agatha		124 Fifth St., Ellwood City	St. Agatha (1895–2000); Holy Redeemer (2000–2022); Divine Grace (2022–)	Closed in 2007; demolished
St. Agnes		5th Ave. and Robinson St., Oakland, Pittsburgh		Closed in 1992 (merged into St. Paul Cathedral).
St. Alexis		10090 Old Perry Hwy., Wexford		Part of St. Aidan Parish.
St. Aloysius		3616 Mount Troy Rd., Reserve Township	St. Aloysius (1893–2021); St. Matthew (2021–)	
St. Alphonsus (Springdale)		750 Pittsburgh St., Springdale		Part of Guardian Angels Parish.
St. Alphonsus (Wexford)		201 Church Rd., Wexford		Part of St. Aidan Parish.
St. Ambrose		1015 Haslage Ave., Spring Hill–City View, Pittsburgh		Holy Wisdom Parish (1994–2019). Closed c. 2019.
St. Andrew (Butler)		1660 N Main St. Extension, Butler		
St. Andrew (North Side)		Beaver Ave., Chateau, Pittsburgh		Closed in 1962. Parish is now part of Christ Our Savior Parish.
St. Ann (Hazelwood)		4731 Chatsworth Ave., Hazelwood, Pittsburgh	St. Ann (1914–1993); St. Stephen (New) (1993–2020); St. Paul Cathedral (2020–)	Closed in 1998
St. Ann (Millvale)		400 Lincoln Ave., Millvale	St. Ann (1875–1994); Holy Spirit (1994–2021); St. Matthew (2021–)	Closed in 1998
St. Anthony (Bessemer)		499 West Poland Ave., Bessemer		Part of Holy Spirit Parish.
St. Anthony (Forestville)		232 Boyers Rd., Forestville		Part of St. Faustina Parish.
St. Anthony Chapel		1704 Harpster St., Troy Hill, Pittsburgh		
St. Athanasius		7 Chalfonte Ave., West View	St. Athanasius (1907–2020); Our Lady of Mount Carmel (2020–)	
St. Augustine		225 37th St., Lawrenceville, Pittsburgh	St. Augustine (1863–1993); Our Lady of Angels (1993–2024); St. Pio of Pietrelcina (2024–)	
St. Bede		509 S Dallas Ave., Point Breeze, Pittsburgh	St. Bede (1922–2020); St. Mary Magdalene (2020–)	
St. Benedict the Moor (Holy Trinity)		1500 Centre Ave., Hill District, Pittsburgh		Personal parish.
St. Blaise		772 Ohio Ave., Midland		
St. Bonaventure		2001 Mount Royal Blvd., Glenshaw	St. Bonaventure (1957–2021); St. Matthew (2021–)	
St. Boniface		2208 East St., Spring Hill–City View, Pittsburgh		Holy Wisdom Parish (1994–2019), Christ Our Savior Parish (2019–).
St. Brigid		Enoch St., Hill District, Pittsburgh		Closed in 1958; church demolished 1961. Parish is now part of Divine Mercy Parish.
St. Camillus		314 West Englewood Ave., New Castle		Part of Holy Spirit Parish.
St. Catherine of Sweden		2554 Wildwood Rd., Allison Park		Part of Ss. Martha and Mary Parish.
St. Cecilia		628 Virginia Ave., Rochester		Part of Our Lady of the Valley Parish.
St. Christopher		229 North Franklin St., Prospect		Part of St. Faustina Parish.
St. Conrad		125 Buttercup Rd., Meridian		
St. Cyril of Alexandria		3854 Brighton Rd., Brighton Heights, Pittsburgh		Christ Our Savior Parish (2019–).
St. Edward		450 Walnut St., Blawnox		Part of St. Pio of Pietrelcina Parish.
St. Elizabeth		1620 Penn Ave., Strip District, Pittsburgh		Closed in 1993 (merged into Saint Patrick and Saint Stanislaus Kostka).
St. Felix		450 13th St., Freedom		Part of Our Lady of the Valley Parish.
St. Ferdinand		2535 Rochester Rd., Cranberry Township	St. Ferdinand (1961–2022); Divine Grace (2022–)	
St. Frances Cabrini		115 Trinity Dr., Aliquippa		
St. Francis of Assisi		2599 Freeport Rd., Harmar Township		Part of St. Pio of Pietrelcina Parish.
St. Gabriel the Archangel		1400 Ingham St., Marshall-Shadeland, Pittsburgh		Risen Lord Parish (1993–1999). Closed in 1999. Parish is now part of Christ Our Savior Parish.
St. Gregory		2 W Beaver St., Zelienople	St. Gregory (1902–2022); Divine Grace (2022–)	
St. Hyacinth		3201 Craft Pl., Oakland, Pittsburgh	St. Hyacinth (1916–1993); St. Regis (New) (1993–2020); St. Paul Cathedral (2020–)	Closed
St. James (Sewickley)		200 Walnut St., Sewickley		Part of Divine Redeemer Parish.
St. James (Wilkinsburg)		718 Franklin Ave., Wilkinsburg	St. James (1869–2020); St. Mary Magdalene (2020–)	
St. James the Apostle		4019 U.S. 422, Pulaski		Part of Holy Spirit Parish.
St. Joachim		301 Saline St., Four Mile Run, Pittsburgh	St. Joachim (1909–1993); St. Rosalia (New) (1993–2020); St. Paul Cathedral (2020–)	Closed
St. John		668 Clearfield Rd., Fenelton		Part of St. Francis of Assisi Parish.
St. John the Baptist (Baden)		377 Linmore Ave., Baden		
St. John the Baptist (Lawrenceville)		3525 Liberty Ave., Lawrenceville, Pittsburgh	St. John the Baptist (1878–1993); Our Lady of Angels (1993–2024); St. Pio of Pietrelcina (2024–)	Closed in 1993
St. John the Baptist (Monaca)		1501 Virginia Ave., Monaca		
St. John Cantius		6th St. and High St., Sharpsburg		Part of St. Juan Diego Parish.
St. John Neumann		2230 Rochester Rd., Franklin Park	St. John Neumann (1979–2022); Regina Coeli (2022–)	
St. Joseph (Bloomfield)		4712 Liberty Ave., Bloomfield, Pittsburgh	St. Joseph (1872–2001); Immaculate Conception–St. Joseph (2001–2012); St. Maria Goretti (2012–2024); St. Pio of Pietrelcina (2024–)	Closed in 2022
St. Joseph (Cabot)		315 Stoney Hollow Rd., Cabot		Part of St. Francis of Assisi Parish.
St. Joseph (Chicora)		864 Chicora Rd., Chicora		Part of St. Clare of Assisi Parish
St. Joseph (Ellport)		Ellport	St. Joseph (1926–1989); Purification of the Blessed Virgin Mary (1989–2000); Holy Redeemer (2000–2022); Divine Grace (2022–)	Closed in 1992
St. Joseph (Manchester)		1250 Liverpool St., Manchester, Pittsburgh		Closed in 1987. Parish is now part of Christ Our Savior Parish.
St. Joseph (O'Hara)		342 Dorseyville Rd., O'Hara Township		
St. Joseph the Worker		1111 S Cascade St., New Castle		Part of Holy Spirit Parish.
St. Kieran		5300 Carnegie St., Lawrenceville, Pittsburgh		St. Matthew Parish (1993–2012). Closed 2012; parish now part of St. Jude Parish.
St. Kilian		7076 Franklin Rd., Cranberry Township		
St. Ladislaus		48 Spruce St., Natrona		Part of Guardian Angels Parish.
St. Lawrence O'Toole		5323 Penn Ave. Garfield, Pittsburgh	St. Lawrence O'Toole (1897–2012); St. Maria Goretti (2012–2024); St. Pio of Pietrelcina (2024–)	Closed in 2020
St. Leo		3113 Brighton Rd., Marshall-Shadeland, Pittsburgh		Risen Lord Parish (1993–1999). Closed in 1999 and demolished in 2001. Parish is now part of Christ Our Savior Parish.
St. Louis		202 W State St., West Sunbury		Part of St. Faustina Parish.
St. Mary (Lawrenceville)		340 46th St., Lawrenceville, Pittsburgh	St. Mary (1853–1993); Our Lady of Angels (1993–2024); St. Pio of Pietrelcina (2024–)	Closed in 1993
St. Mary (New Castle)		124 North Beaver St., New Castle		Part of Holy Spirit Parish.
St. Mary (North Side)		Pressley and Nash St., East Allegheny, Pittsburgh		Closed in 1981; parish is now part of Christ Our Savior Parish.
St. Mary (Sewickley)		444 Glenfield Rd., Sewickley		Part of Divine Redeemer Parish.
St. Mary (Sharpsburg)		211 Garnier St., Sharpsburg		Part of St. Juan Diego Parish.
St. Mary of the Assumption (Butler)		821 Herman Rd., Butler		Part of St. Francis of Assisi Parish.
St. Mary of the Assumption (Glenshaw)		2510 Middle Rd., Glenshaw		
St. Mary of the Assumption (Lawrenceville)		219 57th St., Lawrenceville, Pittsburgh		Closed; parish now part of St. Jude Parish.
St. Mary of Mercy		202 Stanwix St., Downtown, Pittsburgh	St. Mary of Mercy (1870–2020); Divine Mercy(2020–)	
St. Matthias (Evans City)		Evans City	St. Matthias (1939–2017); St. Gregory (2017–2022); Divine Grace (2022–)	Closed; demolished
St. Michael the Archangel		432 Center Ave., Butler		
St. Monica		Wampum	St. Monica (1902–1992); Queen of Heaven (1992–2011); Holy Redeemer (2011–2022); Divine Grace (2022–)	Closed in 2008
St. Nicholas (Millvale)		24 Maryland Ave., Millvale		Personal parish.
St. Nicholas (Troy Hill)		1326 E Ohio St., Troy Hill, Pittsburgh		Closed in 1994 (merged into St. Nicholas, Millvale). Demolished in 2013.
St. Patrick		Liberty Ave. at 17th St., Strip District, Pittsburgh		Established 1808.
St. Paul		128 N McKean St., Butler		
St. Peter (Butler)		127 Franklin St., Butler		
St. Peter (North Side)		720 Arch St., Allegheny Center, Pittsburgh		Christ Our Savior Parish (2019–).
St. Peter (Slippery Rock)		670 S Main St., Slippery Rock		Part of St. Faustina Parish.
St. Philomena (Squirrel Hill)		6424 Forward Ave., Squirrel Hill, Pittsburgh		Closed in 1993. Parish is now part of St. Mary Magdalene Parish.
St. Philomena (Strip District)		14th St. and Liberty Ave., Strip District, Pittsburgh		Closed in 1921; parish relocated to Squirrel Hill.
St. Raphael		1118 Chislett St., Morningside, Pittsburgh		Part of St. Jude Parish.
St. Regis		3250 Parkview Ave., Oakland, Pittsburgh	St. Regis (1953–1993); St. Regis (New) (1993–2020); St. Paul Cathedral (2020–)	
St. Richard (Gibsonia)		3841 Dickey Rd., Gibsonia		Part of Ss. Martha and Mary Parish.
St. Richard (Hill District)		2900 Bedford Ave., Hill District, Pittsburgh		Closed in 1977. Parish is now part of Divine Mercy Parish.
St. Rosalia		411 Greenfield Ave., Greenfield, Pittsburgh	St. Rosalia (1900–1993); St. Rosalia (New) (1993–2020); St. Paul Cathedral (2020–)	
St. Scholastica		309 Brilliant Ave., Aspinwall		
St. Sebastian		311 Siebert Rd., Ross Township	St. Sebastian (1952–2020); Our Lady of Mount Carmel (2020–)	
St. Stanislaus Kostka		57 21st St., Strip District, Pittsburgh		
St. Stephen		5115 Second Ave., Hazelwood, Pittsburgh	St. Stephen (1871–1993); St. Stephen (New) (1993–2020); St. Paul Cathedral (2020–)	
St. Teresa		Koppel	St. Teresa (1871–1992); Queen of Heaven (1992–2011); Holy Redeemer (2011–2022); Divine Grace (2022–)	Closed in 2011
St. Teresa of Avila		1000 Avila Ct., Perrysville	St. Teresa of Avila (1867–2020); Our Lady of Mount Carmel (2020–)	
St. Titus		952 Franklin Ave., Aliquippa		
St. Ursula		3937 Kirk Ave., Allison Park		Combined in 2018 with St. Mary of the Assumption into a single parish
St. Victor		531 Bairdford Rd., Bairdford		Part of Our Lady of the Lakes Parish.
St. Vincent de Paul		1 Lucymont Dr., New Castle		Part of Holy Spirit Parish.
St. Vitus		910 South Mercer St., New Castle		Part of Holy Spirit Parish.
St. Wenceslaus		887 Progress St., North Shore, Pittsburgh		Closed in 1989. Parish is now part of Christ Our Savior Parish.
St. Wendelin		210 Saint Wendelin Rd., Butler		Part of St. Clare of Assisi Parish.
Ss. John and Paul		2586 Wexford Bayne Rd., Sewickley		
Ss. Peter and Paul (Beaver)		200 3rd St., Beaver		Part of Our Lady of the Valley Parish.
Ss. Peter and Paul (East Liberty)		130 Larimer Ave., East Liberty, Pittsburgh	Ss. Peter and Paul (1857–1992); St. Charles Lwanga (1992–2020); St. Mary Magdalene (2020–)	Closed in 1992
Transfiguration		100 McKrell Rd., Russellton		Part of Our Lady of the Lakes Parish.

== South Vicariate ==
Name	Image	Location	Parish	Description/Notes
Ascension		114 Berry St., Ingram		Part of St. Philip Parish.
Ave Maria		126 Church St., Bentleyville		Part of St. Katharine Drexel Parish.
Corpus Christi		2515 Versailles Ave., McKeesport		Part of Mary, Mother of God Parish.
Good Shepherd		Braddock Ave. at Frazier St., Braddock		Part of St. Joseph the Worker Parish.
Guardian Angels		213 Steuben St., West End, Pittsburgh		Closed in 1994 (merged into new Guardian Angels Parish). Parish is now part of St. Philip Parish.
Holy Angels		408 Baldwin Rd., Hays, Pittsburgh		Part of Blessed Trinity Parish.
Holy Child		212 Station St., Bridgeville		Part of Corpus Christi Parish.
Holy Cross		East Carson St. and S 32nd St., South Side Flats, Pittsburgh		Closed in 1950. Parish is now part of Mary, Queen of Peace Parish.
Holy Innocents		3021 Landis St., Sheraden, Pittsburgh		Closed in 2016 (merged into St. Philip Parish).
Holy Name		32 South 1st St., Duquesne		Part of St. Thomas the Apostle Parish.
Holy Rosary		1 Orchard St., Muse		Part of St. Oscar Romero Parish.
Holy Spirit		2603 Old Elizabeth Rd., West Mifflin		Part of Triumph of the Holy Cross Parish.
Holy Trinity (McKees Rocks)		5718 Steubenville Pike, McKees Rocks		Part of Archangel Gabriel Parish.
Holy Trinity (West Mifflin)		529 Grant Ave. Extension, West Mifflin		Part of St. Thomas the Apostle Parish.
Immaculate Conception		119 W Chestnut St., Washington		Part of St. James Parish.
Madonna del Castello		2021 South Braddock Ave., Swissvale		Part of St. Joseph the Worker Parish.
Mary, Mother of the Church		624 Washington Ave., Charleroi		Part of St. Andrew the Apostle Parish.
Nativity		5800 Brownsville Rd., South Park Township		Part of Our Lady of Hope Parish.
North American Martyrs		2526 Haymaker Rd., Monroeville		Part of Christ the Divine Shepherd Parish.
Our Lady of Grace		310 Kane Blvd., Scott Township		Part of St. Michael the Archangel Parish.
Our Lady of Joy		2000 O'Block Rd., Plum		Part of Holy Family Parish.
Our Lady of Lourdes		1109 Main St., Burgettstown		Part of St. Isidore the Farmer Parish.
Our Lady of the Miraculous Medal		300 Pike St., Meadowlands		Part of St. Oscar Romero Parish.
Our Lady of the Valley		2nd St. Ext. and Park Manor Rd., Donora		Part of St. Andrew the Apostle Parish.
Queen of the Rosary		530 Michigan Ave., Glassport		Part of Ss. Joachim and Anne Parish.
Resurrection (Brookline)		1100 Creedmoor Ave., Brookline, Pittsburgh		Part of St. Teresa of Kolkata Parish.
Resurrection (West Mifflin)		1 Majka Dr., West Mifflin		Part of St. Thomas the Apostle Parish.
Sacred Heart (Braddock Hills)		1600 Brinton Rd., Braddock Hills		Part of St. Joseph the Worker Parish.
Sacred Heart (Claysville)		Main St., Claysville		Part of St. James Parish.
St. Adalbert		160 S 15th St., South Side, Pittsburgh		Part of Mary, Queen of Peace Parish.
St. Agnes (Richeyville)		2 Church St., Richeyville		Part of St. Katharine Drexel Parish.
St. Agnes (West Mifflin)		622 Saint Agnes Ln., West Mifflin		Part of St. Thomas the Apostle Parish.
St. Albert the Great		3171 Churchview Ave., Baldwin		Part of Blessed Trinity Parish.
St. Alphonsus		219 W Lincoln Ave., McDonald		Part of St. Isidore the Farmer Parish.
St. Angela Merici		1640 Fawcett Ave., White Oak		Part of Mary, Mother of God Parish.
St. Ann (Bulger)		967 Grant St., Bulger		Part of St. Isidore the Farmer Parish.
St. Ann (Waynesburg)		232 E High St., Waynesburg		Part of St. Matthias Parish.
St. Anne		400 Hoodridge Dr., Castle Shannon		Part of St. Paul of the Cross Parish.
St. Anthony		303 E 10th Ave., Homestead		Closed in 2009. Parish is now part of St. Thomas the Apostle Parish.
St. Barbara		45 Prestley Rd., Bridgeville		Part of Corpus Christi Parish.
St. Bartholomew		111 Erhardt Dr., Penn Hills		Part of Christ the Divine Shepherd Parish.
St. Basil		1735 Brownsville Rd., Carrick, Pittsburgh		Part of Blessed Trinity Parish.
St. Benedict the Abbot		120 Abington Dr., McMurray		Part of St. John XXIII Parish.
St. Bernadette		245 Azalea Dr., Monroeville		Part of Christ the Divine Shepherd Parish.
St. Bernard		311 Washington Rd., Mt. Lebanon		Part of St. Michael the Archangel Parish.
St. Canice		220 Orchard Pl., Knoxville, Pittsburgh		St. John Vianney Parish (1994–2005). Closed in 2005. Parish is now part of Mary, Queen of Peace Parish.
St. Casimir		2132 Sarah St., South Side Flats, Pittsburgh		Closed in 1992 (merged into Prince of Peace Parish). Parish is now part of Mary, Queen of Peace Parish.
St. Catherine of Siena (Beechview)		1810 Belasco Ave., Beechview, Pittsburgh		Part of St. Teresa of Kolkata Parish.
St. Catherine of Siena (Crescent)		199 McGovern Blvd., Crescent Township		Part of Most Sacred Heart of Jesus Parish.
St. Clare of Assisi		460 Reed St., Clairton		Part of Triumph of the Holy Cross Parish.
St. Colman		100 Tri Boro Ave., Turtle Creek		Part of St. Joseph the Worker Parish.
St. Columbkille		103 Church Rd., Imperial		Part of St. Isidore the Farmer Parish.
St. Damien of Molokai		722 W Main St., Monongahela		Part of St. Andrew the Apostle Parish.
St. Elizabeth Ann Seton		330 Third Ave., Carnegie		Part of St. Raphael the Archangel Parish.
St. Elizabeth of Hungary		1 Grove Pl., Pleasant Hills		Part of Triumph of the Holy Cross Parish.
St. Eugene		3210 Liberty Way, Liberty		Part of Ss. Joachim and Anne Parish.
St. Francis		9th Ave. and McClure St., Munhall		Closed in 1968 after a fire. Parish is now part of St. Thomas the Apostle Parish.
St. Francis of Assisi		3609 Washington Ave., Finleyville		Part of St. John XXIII Parish.
St. Francis de Sales		812 Chartiers Ave., McKees Rocks		Closed in 1993 (merged into St. John of God Parish). Parish is now part of Archangel Gabriel Parish.
St. Gabriel of the Sorrowful Virgin		5200 Greenridge Dr., Whitehall		Part of Our Lady of Hope Parish.
St. Gerard Majella		121 Dawn Dr., Verona		Part of Christ the Divine Shepherd Parish.
St. Germaine		7003 Baptist Rd., Bethel Park		Part of Our Lady of Hope Parish.
St. Henry		2428 Arlington Ave., Arlington, Pittsburgh		St. John Vianney Parish (1994–2005). Closed in 2005. Parish is now part of Mary, Queen of Peace Parish.
St. Hilary		320 Henderson Ave., Washington		Part of St. James Parish.
St. Hugh		408 Route 88, Carmichaels		Part of St. Matthias Parish.
St. Ignatius of Antioch		305 Grant St., Bobtown		Part of St. Matthias Parish.
St. Irenaeus		387 Maryland Ave., Oakmont		Part of Holy Family Parish.
St. Isaac Jogues		1216 Collins Ave., Jefferson Hills		Part of St. John XXIII Parish.
St. James		326 S Main St., West End, Pittsburgh		Closed in 2004. Parish is now part of St. Philip Parish. Restored as a church and re-opened on March 28, 2015 by the Society of St. Pius X (SSPX).
St. Januarius		1450 Renton Rd., Plum		Part of Holy Family Parish.
St. Joan of Arc		6414 Montour St., South Park Township		Part of St. Catherine Laboure Parish.
St. John the Baptist		444 St John St, Plum		Part of Holy Family Parish.
St. John Capistran		1610 McMillan Rd., Upper St. Clair Township, Pennsylvania		Part of Resurrection Parish.
St. John the Evangelist		54 S 14th St., South Side Flats, Pittsburgh		Closed in 1992 (merged into Prince of Peace Parish); later demolished. Parish is now part of Mary, Queen of Peace Parish.
St. John Fisher		33 Lewin Ln., Churchill		Part of St. Joseph the Worker Parish.
St. John Vianney (St. George)		823 Climax St., Allentown, Pittsburgh		Rededicated as St. John Vianney in 2005. Closed in 2016; parish is now part of Mary, Queen of Peace Parish.
St. Josaphat		2301 Mission St., South Side Slopes, Pittsburgh		Prince of Peace Parish (1992–2006). Closed in 2006; parish is now part of Mary, Queen of Peace Parish.
St. Joseph (Coraopolis)		1301 5th Ave., Coraopolis		Part of Most Sacred Heart of Jesus Parish.
St. Joseph (Duquesne)		817 West Grant Ave., Duquesne		Part of St. Thomas the Apostle Parish.
St. Joseph (Mount Oliver)		438 Ormsby Ave., Mount Oliver, Pittsburgh		St. John Vianney Parish (1994–2005). Closed in 2005. Parish is now part of Mary, Queen of Peace Parish.
St. Joseph (Verona)		825 Second St., Verona		Part of Holy Family Parish.
St. Jude the Apostle		405 Westinghouse Ave., Wilmerding		Part of St. Joseph the Worker Parish.
St. Justin		539 Boggs Ave., Mount Washington, Pittsburgh		Closed in 2013 (merged into St. Mary of the Mount). Parish is now part of Mary, Queen of Peace Parish.
St. Louise de Marillac		320 McMurray Rd., Upper St. Clair Township		Part of St. Catherine Laboure Parish.
St. Malachy (Coraopolis)		343 Forest Grove Rd., Coraopolis		Part of Archangel Gabriel Parish.
St. Malachy (South Side)		West Carson St., South Shore, Pittsburgh		Closed in 1928. Parish is now part of Mary, Queen of Peace Parish.
St. Marcellus		1340 Jefferson Rd., Jefferson		Part of St. Matthias Parish.
St. Margaret		437 E 10th Ave., Munhall		Closed in 1991 (merged into St. Maximilian Kolbe). Parish is now part of St. Thomas the Apostle Parish.
St. Margaret Mary		One Parish Pl., Moon Township		Part of Most Sacred Heart of Jesus Parish.
St. Margaret of Scotland		310 Mansfield Ave., Green Tree		Part of St. Raphael the Archangel Parish.
St. Martin		1030 Logue St., Crafton Heights, Pittsburgh		Closed; parish is now part of St. Philip Parish.
St. Mary		10 Saint Mary's Ln., Cecil		Part of Corpus Christi Parish.
St. Mary Help of Christians		1011 Church Ave., McKees Rocks		Part of Archangel Gabriel Parish.
St. Mary Magdalene		1008 Amity St., Homestead		Closed in 2009. Parish is now part of St. Thomas the Apostle Parish.
St. Mary of the Mount		403 Grandview Ave., Mount Washington, Pittsburgh		Part of Mary, Queen of Peace Parish.
St. Matthew		156 S 19th St., South Side Flats, Pittsburgh		Prince of Peace Parish (1992–2006). Closed 2006; parish is now part of Mary, Queen of Peace Parish.
St. Maurice		2001 Ardmore Blvd., Forest Hills		Part of St. Joseph the Worker Parish.
St. Maximilian Kolbe (St. Anne)		363 West 11th Ave. Extension, Homestead		Part of St. Thomas the Apostle Parish.
St. Michael (Avella)		97 Highland Ave., Avella		Part of St. Isidore the Farmer Parish.
St. Michael (Elizabeth)		101 McLay Dr., Elizabeth		Part of Ss. Joachim and Anne Parish.
St. Michael (Munhall)		605 E 9th Ave., Munhall		Closed in 2009. Parish is now part of St. Thomas the Apostle Parish.
St. Michael (Pitcairn)		750 Wall Ave., Pitcairn		Part of Christ the Divine Shepherd Parish.
St. Michael (South Side)		21 Pius St., South Side Slopes, Pittsburgh		Closed in 1992 (merged into Prince of Peace Parish). Parish is now part of Mary, Queen of Peace Parish.
St. Norbert		2413 St. Norberts St., Overbrook, Pittsburgh		Closed; parish is now part of Blessed Trinity Parish.
St. Patrick (Canonsburg)		317 W Pike St., Canonsburg		Part of St. Oscar Romero Parish.
St. Patrick (McKeesport)		312 32nd St., McKeesport		Part of Mary, Mother of God Parish.
St. Patrick (Oakdale)		7322 Noblestown Rd., Oakdale		Part of St. Isidore the Farmer Parish.
St. Peter (South Side)		2801 Sarah St., South Side Flats, Pittsburgh		Prince of Peace Parish (1992–2020). Closed in 2020; parish is now part of Mary, Queen of Peace Parish.
St. Philip		50 W Crafton Ave., Crafton		Part of St. Philip Parish.
St. Pius X		3040 Pioneer Ave., Brookline, Pittsburgh		Part of St. Teresa of Kolkata Parish.
St. Rita		219 West Schwab Ave., Munhall		Part of St. Thomas the Apostle Parish.
St. Robert Bellarmine		1313 Fifth Ave., East McKeesport		Part of Mary, Mother of God Parish.
St. Susanna		200 Stotler Rd., Penn Hills		Part of Christ the Divine Shepherd Parish.
St. Sylvester		3754 Brownsville Rd., Brentwood		Part of Blessed Trinity Parish.
St. Therese of Lisieux		1 Saint Therese Ct., Munhall		Part of St. Thomas the Apostle Parish.
St. Thomas à Becket		139 Gill Hall Rd., Jefferson Hills		Part of Triumph of the Holy Cross Parish.
St. Thomas More		126 Fort Couch Rd., Bethel Park		Part of Resurrection Parish.
St. Valentine		2710 Ohio St., Bethel Park		Part of Our Lady of Hope Parish.
St. Vincent de Paul		200 Tabor St., Esplen, Pittsburgh		Closed in 1993 (merged into St. John of God Parish). Parish is now part of Archangel Gabriel Parish.
St. Wendelin		2728 Custer Ave., Carrick, Pittsburgh		Part of Blessed Trinity Parish. Demolished in 2024.
St. Winifred		550 Sleepy Hollow Rd., Mt. Lebanon		Part of St. Paul of the Cross Parish.
Ss. Peter and Paul		1321 Mifflin St., Homestead		Closed in 1992 (merged into St. Maximilian Kolbe Parish). Parish is now part of St. Thomas the Apostle Parish.
Ss. Simon and Jude		1607 Greentree Rd., Scott Township		Part of St. Raphael the Archangel Parish.
Word of God		7446 McClure Ave., Swissvale		Part of St. Joseph the Worker Parish.
