= Saint Mary's Academy Building =

- U.S. Historic district – Contributing property
- Pittsburgh Historic Designation
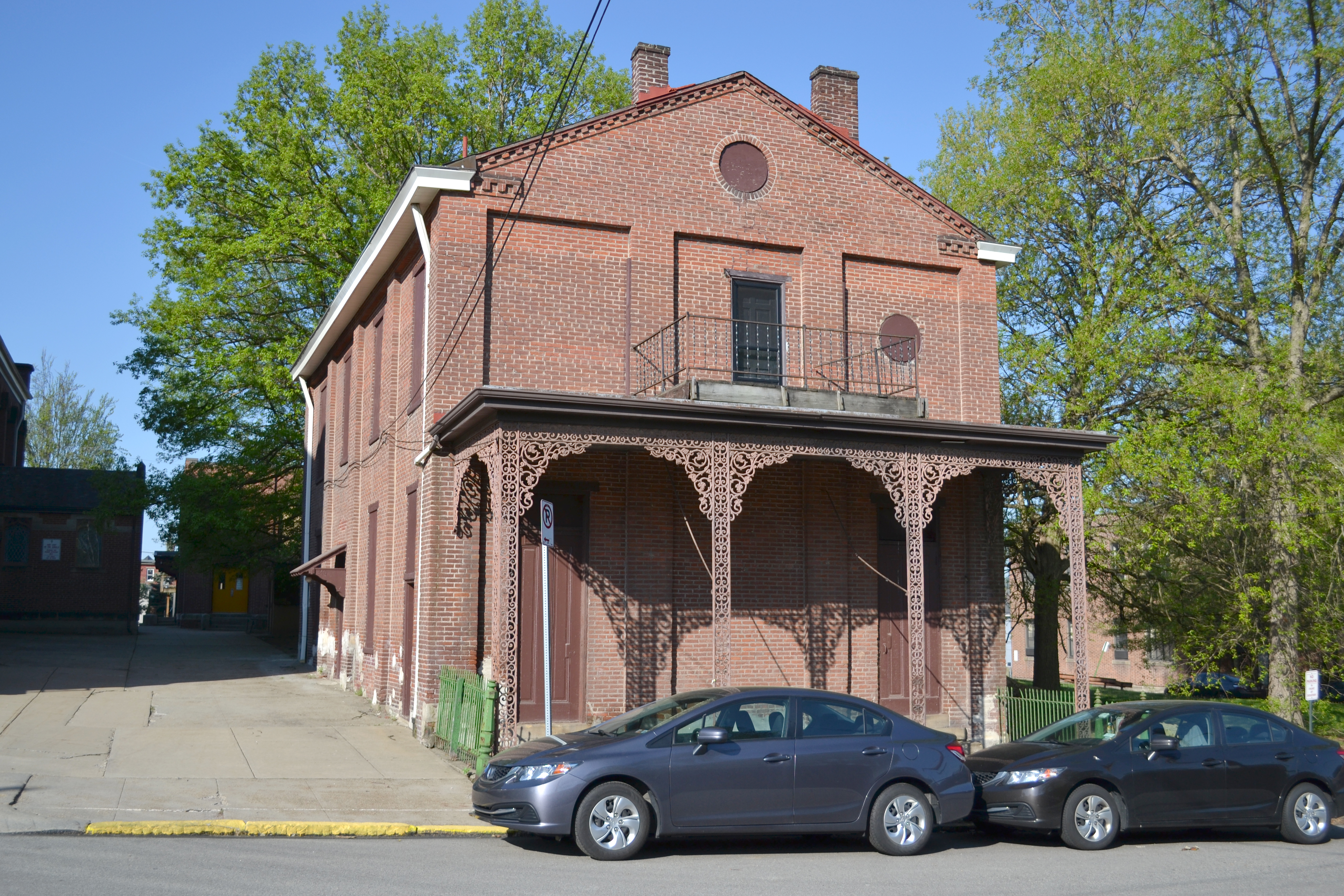
- St. Mary's Academy in 2018

- Location within Pittsburgh
- Location: 340 46th St. Pittsburgh, Pennsylvania
- Coordinates: 40°28′12.15″N 79°57′18.7″W
- Built: 1854
- Part of: Lawrenceville Historic District (ID100004020)

Significant dates
- Designated CP: July 8, 2019
- Designated CPHD: December 30, 2008

The Saint Mary's Academy Building is a historic building in the Lawrenceville neighborhood of Pittsburgh, Pennsylvania. Built in 1854, it is a notable example of Greek Revival architecture and one of the neighborhood's only surviving buildings dating to the pre–Civil War era. It was the first structure built by St. Mary's parish, the first Catholic parish in Lawrenceville, and was originally used as both a church and school. In 1874, a new St. Mary's Church was built next door. St. Mary's merged with three other Lawrenceville parishes (Holy Family, St. Augustine, and St. John the Baptist) in 1993 to form the new Our Lady of Angels parish. The St. Mary church buildings remained in use for a few years but closed in 2004.

In 2007, the property was sold to the Catholic Cemeteries Association, which administers the adjacent St. Mary Cemetery. The association planned to raze the Academy building to provide more room for burials, but the building was nominated as a Pittsburgh historic landmark to protect it from demolition. The building was given landmark status on December 30, 2008. It remains vacant as of 2018.
