= Felix Lieftuchter =

American artist and church muralist

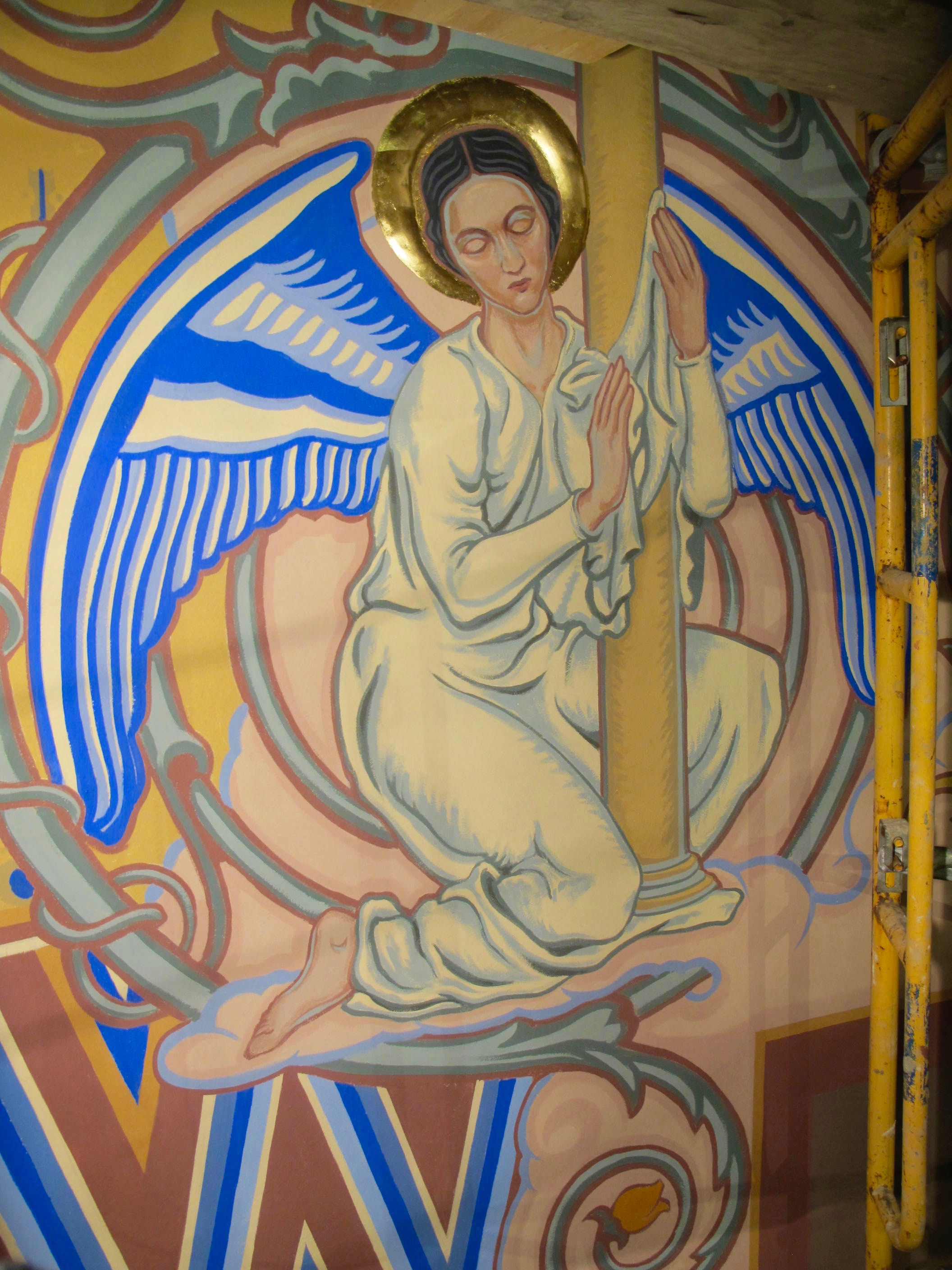

Felix Bernard Lieftuchter (born October 29, 1882) was an American artist and church muralist. He produced at least six major church decorations, painted landscapes, and engaged in portraiture. His church decorations were often flat and graphic in character.

== Career ==
Lieftuchter was born in Cincinnati to German immigrant parents. When he was 15, he went back to Germany with his family, and it was at that time or shortly after that he began school at the Akademie der Bildenden Künste in Munich, Germany with Karl Von Marr and/or Franz von Stuck. Also, during this period he went to Rome and other areas of Europe to study church decorations. He also studied with Frank Duvenek.

His work as an artist was most prominently was in the field of church decoration, although he also painted landscapes and portraits and worked with mosaics.

He spent time or lived in Cincinnati, Chicago, Munich, Toledo, Pittsburgh, New York City, Miami, and Mexico City. His latter years were spent in Mexico City, where he engaged in portraiture. He was living there as late as 1972, at 90 years of age. He was a long term guest at the Casa Gonzales. Contemporary pictures of the rooms show antique portrait paintings.

=== Collaborators ===
Lieftuchter had a relationship with the architect John T. Comes, who wrote the 1920 book "Catholic Art and Architecture". He did decorations in several churches that Comes or his firm, Comès, Perry and McMullen, designed.

=== Assistants ===
When Lieftuchter painted the murals at Pittsburgh's St. Agnes church, he was assisted by two female art students from Pittsburgh - Helen Hartz and Ann Murray - both about 20 years old.

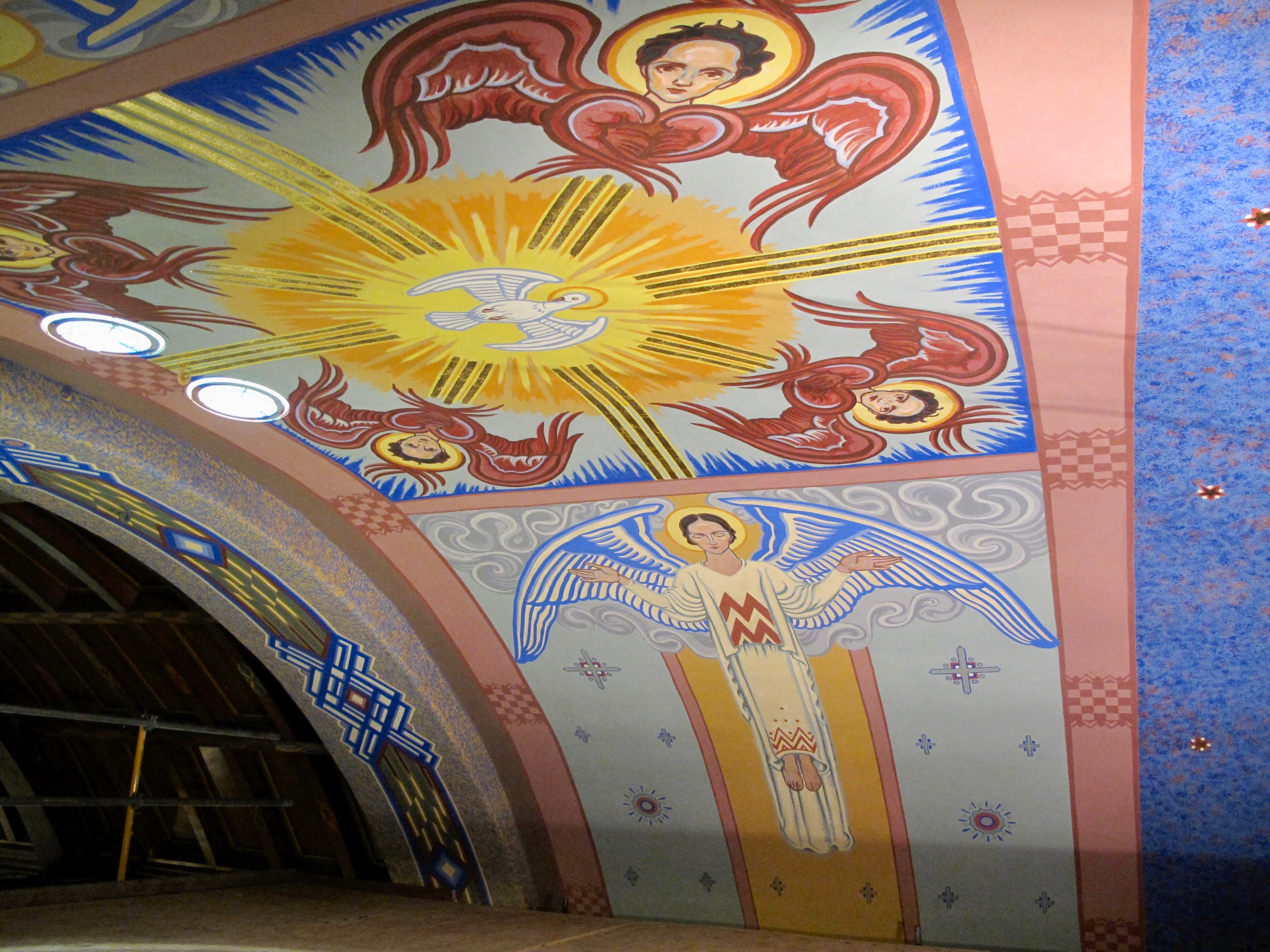

== Projects ==
These are whole church decorations, often painted in Keim paint.

- Cathedral of the Madeleine, Salt Lake City, Utah
- St. Aloysius Church, Bowling Green, Ohio
- Holy Rosary Cathedral, Toledo, Ohio
- St. Joseph's Cathedral, Wheeling, West Virginia
- St. Agnes' Church Apse in Cleveland, Ohio (destroyed By fire, 1975)
- St. Agnes Church, Carlow University, Pittsburgh, PA.
- St. Columba, Johnston, PA. (oil on canvas mural)
- Saint Vincent De Paul, Buffalo, NY. (1924-1926) Mural and Mosaics
- Toledo Central Catholic High School Chapel

=== Possible projects ===
- There may also be some over-painted murals in Rochester, NY in churches that were designed by architect John T. Comes or his surviving partners, Thomas, Perry & McMullen.

== Gallery ==
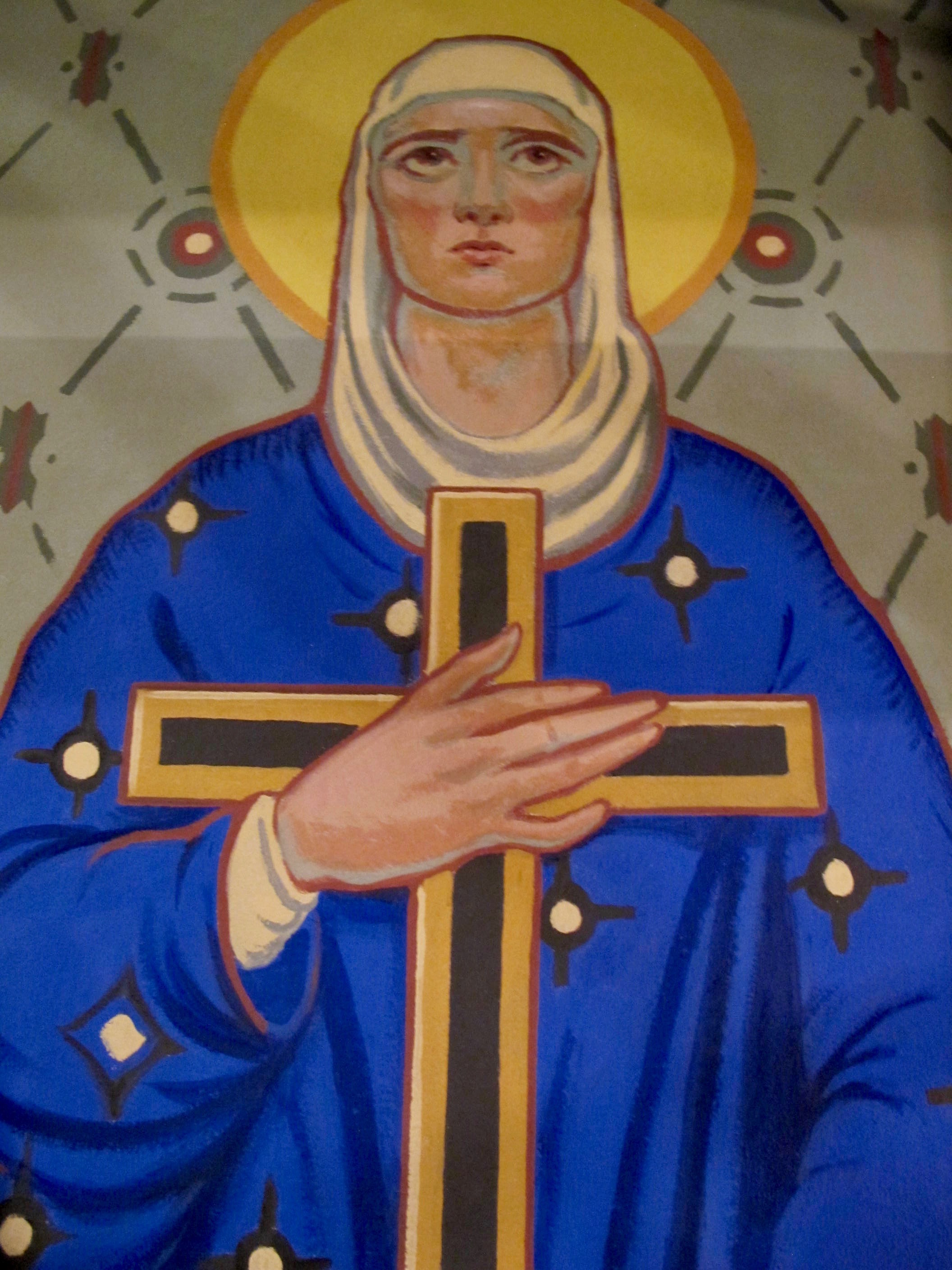

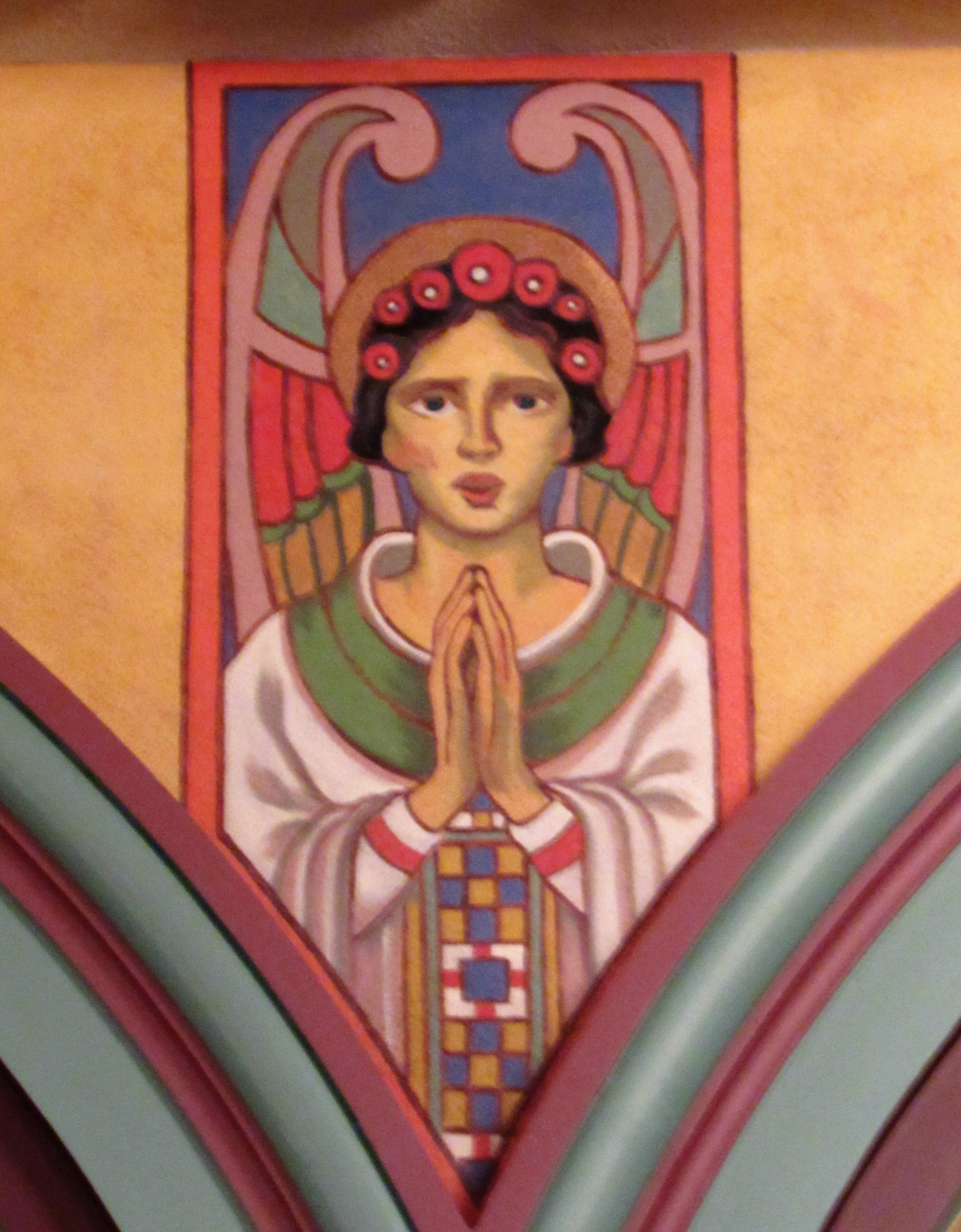

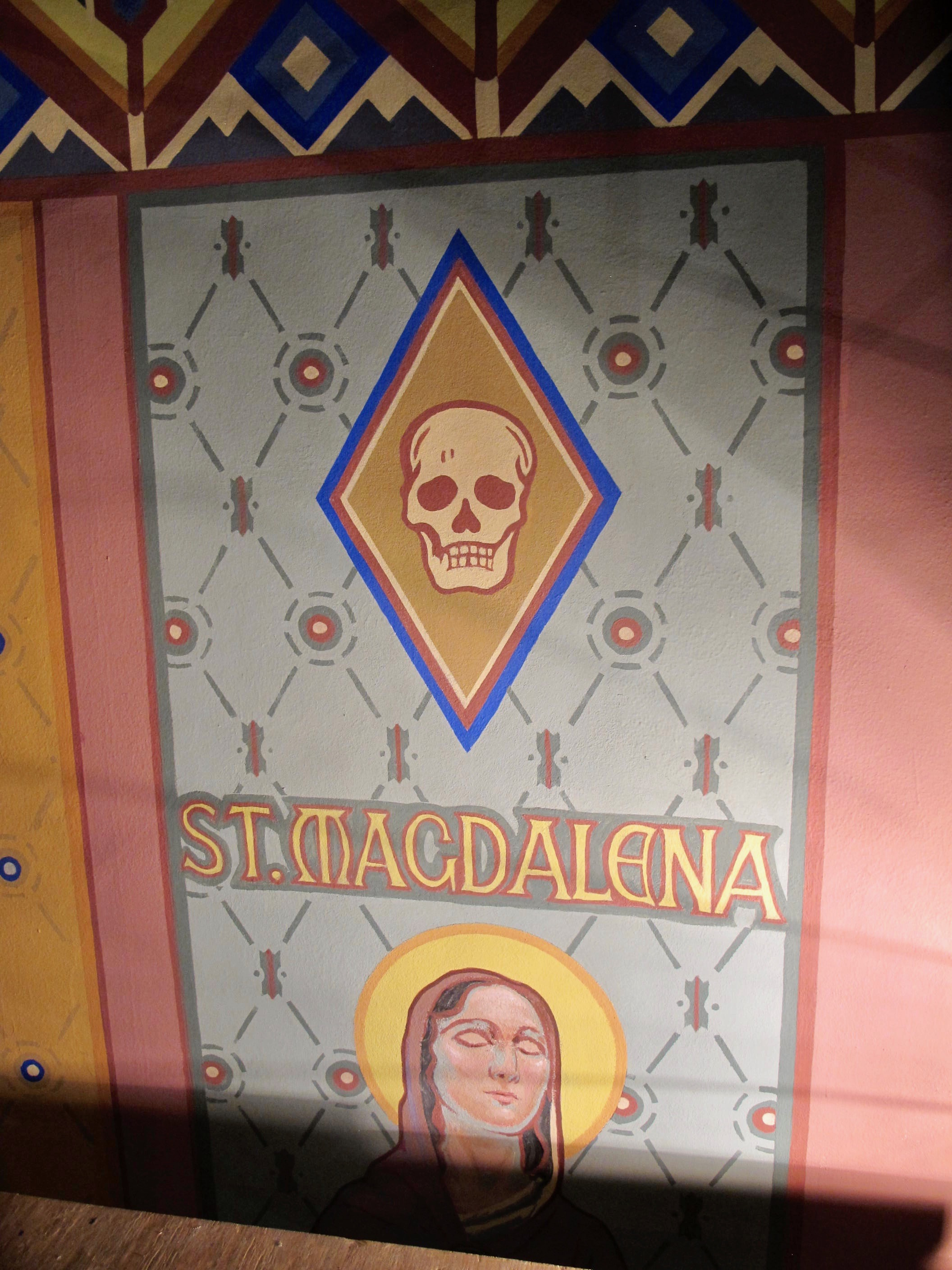

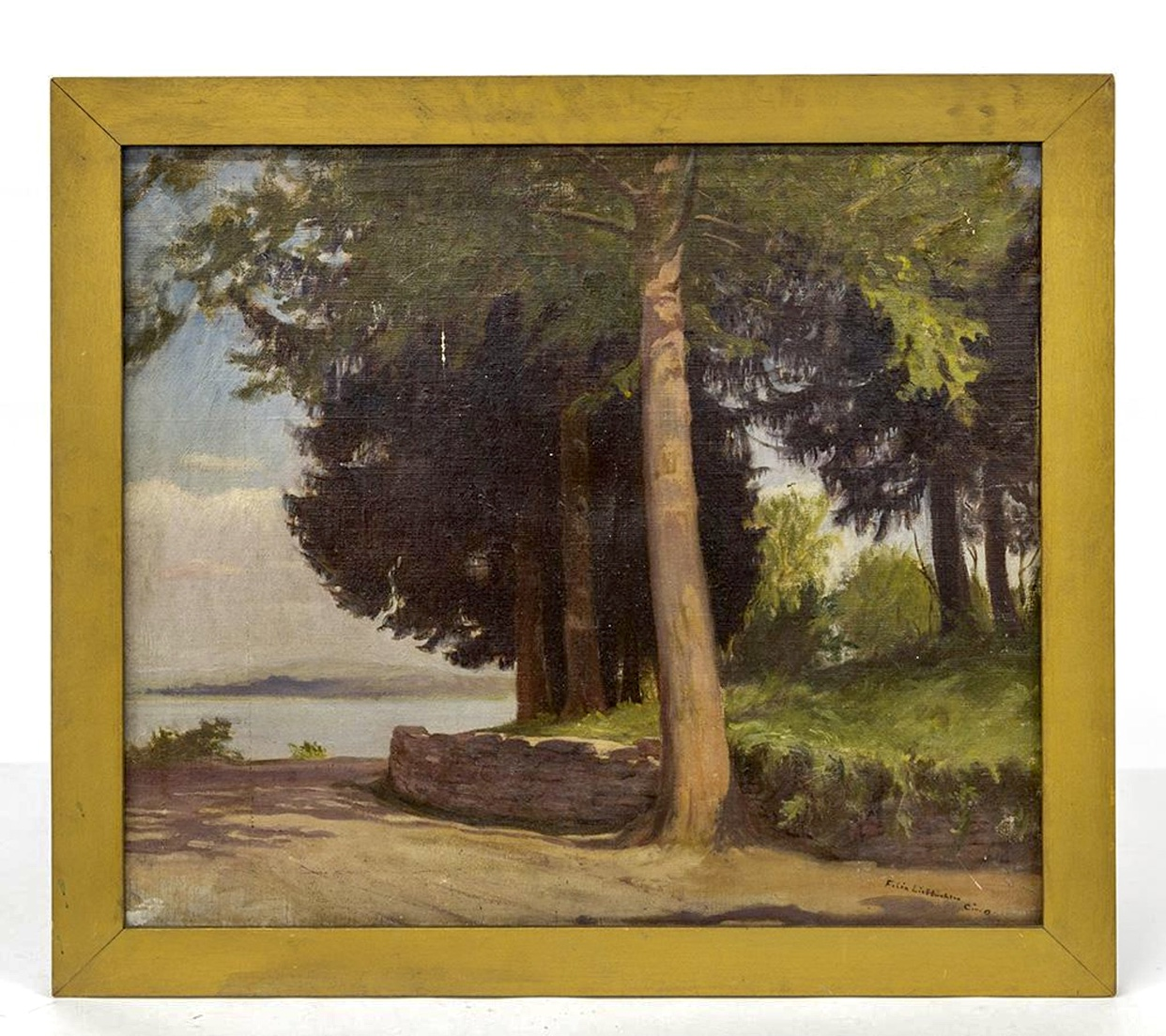

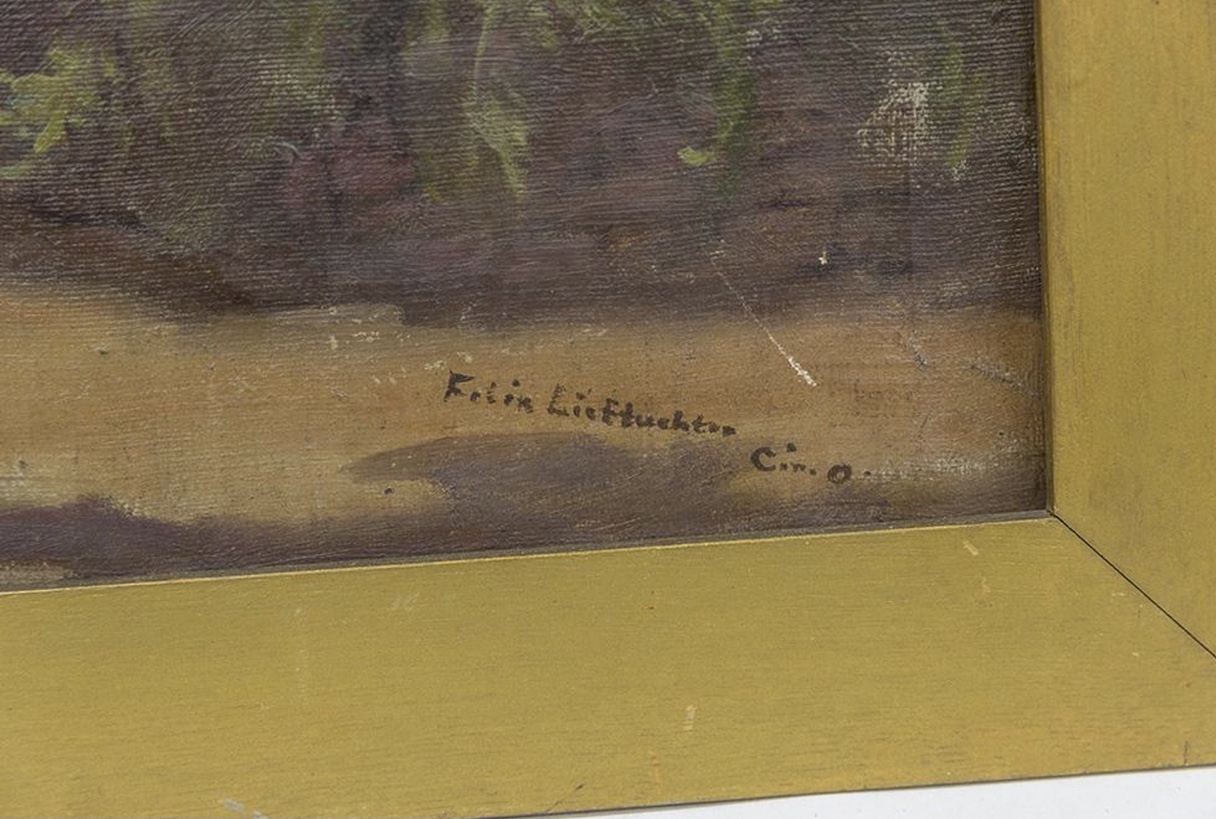

Cathedral of the Madeleine Chancel Mural
