= St. Mary's Church (Pittsburgh) =

- U.S. Historic district – Contributing property
- Pittsburgh Landmark – PHLF
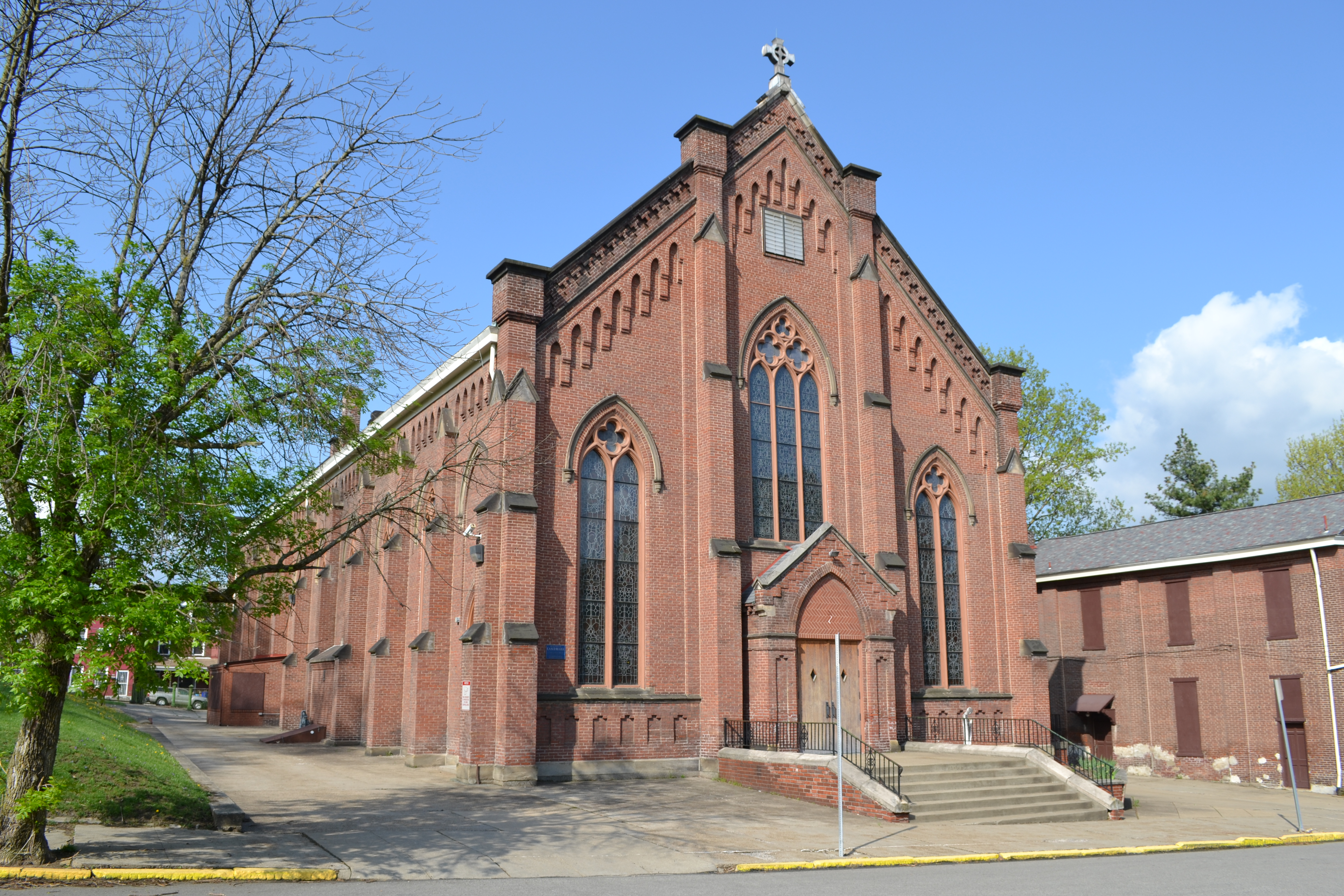
- St. Mary's Church in 2018

- Location within Pittsburgh
- Location: 340 46th St. Pittsburgh, Pennsylvania
- Coordinates: 40°28′11.5″N 79°57′19.5″W
- Built: 1874
- Architect: James Sylvester Devlin
- Part of: Lawrenceville Historic District (ID100004020)

Significant dates
- Designated CP: July 8, 2019
- Designated PHLF: 1971

St. Mary's Church is an historic, former American Catholic church that is located in the Lawrenceville neighborhood of Pittsburgh, Pennsylvania.

== History and architectural features ==
Built in 1874, this historic church building was added to the List of Pittsburgh History and Landmarks Foundation Historic Landmarks in 1971. The St. Mary's Church property also includes the St. Mary's Academy building, a Pittsburgh historic landmark.

In 1993, St. Mary's parish merged with three other Lawrenceville parishes (Holy Family, St. Augustine, and St. John the Baptist) to form the Our Lady of Angels parish. St. Mary's Church remained in use by the new parish for a few years but closed in 2004 when operations were consolidated at St. Augustine.

In 2007, the former St. Mary's buildings were purchased by the Catholic Cemeteries Association, which administers the adjacent St. Mary Cemetery. The church building was converted into a chapel for the cemetery.
