= James B. Drew =

American judge (1877–1953)

James Byron Drew
- Born: April 27, 1877; Pittsburgh, Pennsylvania
- Died: September 5, 1953 (aged 76); Pittsburgh, Pennsylvania
- Occupations: Attorney, Judge
- Known for: Chief Justice, Supreme Court of Pennsylvania
- Spouses: Rhoda Sproules; Mary Snyder Drew (died 1916)
- Children: 3

James B. Drew (April 27, 1877 – September 5, 1953) was a chief justice of the Supreme Court of Pennsylvania. He was born and died in Pittsburgh.

== Biography ==
Drew was born on April 27, 1877 to John and Martha (Rorke) Drew. He attended the public schools of his native city. Following a period of attendance at the University of Michigan, he graduated from Columbia University in 1900 with both a Bachelor of Laws and a Master of Arts degree. In that same year, he was admitted to the New York Bar. After practicing in New York for about two years, he returned to Pittsburgh in 1902. In 1906, he was appointed to a position as Assistant City Solicitor, by Mayor George W. Guthrie.

He was elected as a Judge of the County Court in 1911 for a term beginning in 1912. He remained there until 1920, interrupted by service as a Captain in the U.S. Army during World War I. In 1920, he was elected to the Court of Common Pleas and in 1930, he was elected to a seat on the state's Superior Court. This position proved short-lived; Drew was appointed to the Supreme Court of Pennsylvania by Governor Gifford Pinchot, to fill a temporary vacancy caused by a death, receiving his commission on September 28, 1931. Less than a year later, he was easily elected to a full term of 21 years on the Supreme Court - he ran on the Republican, Democratic and Liberal slates.

In 1950, he became the Chief Justice following the death of the previous Chief. At that time, he commented that he had already served as a commissioned judge longer than anyone else in the state. Drew retired in November, 1952, due to his declining health.

He was a member of the Duquesne Club in Pittsburgh, the Rolling Rock Club in Ligonier, the Everglades Club and the Bath and Tennis Club, both in Palm Beach, Florida, and the Union Interalliee in Paris, France. He was instrumental in starting the American Legion in Allegheny County.

== Death ==
He died on September 5, 1953, aged 76, at his home at 625 Morewood Avenue in Pittsburgh. Drew, a Roman Catholic, was buried at St. Mary Cemetery, in the Lawrenceville section of Pittsburgh.

His survivors included his second wife, Mary Snyder Drew, the daughter of a wealthy Pittsburgh industrialist. (His first wife, Rhoda Sproules, died in 1916.) Other survivors included a son, Allegheny County Common Pleas Judge John Drew, and two daughters, noted historical preservationist Barbara Hofstott, and Rhoda McComas.
