= St. Philomena's Church (Pittsburgh) =

Coordinates: 40°25′38.5″N 79°55′04.2″W

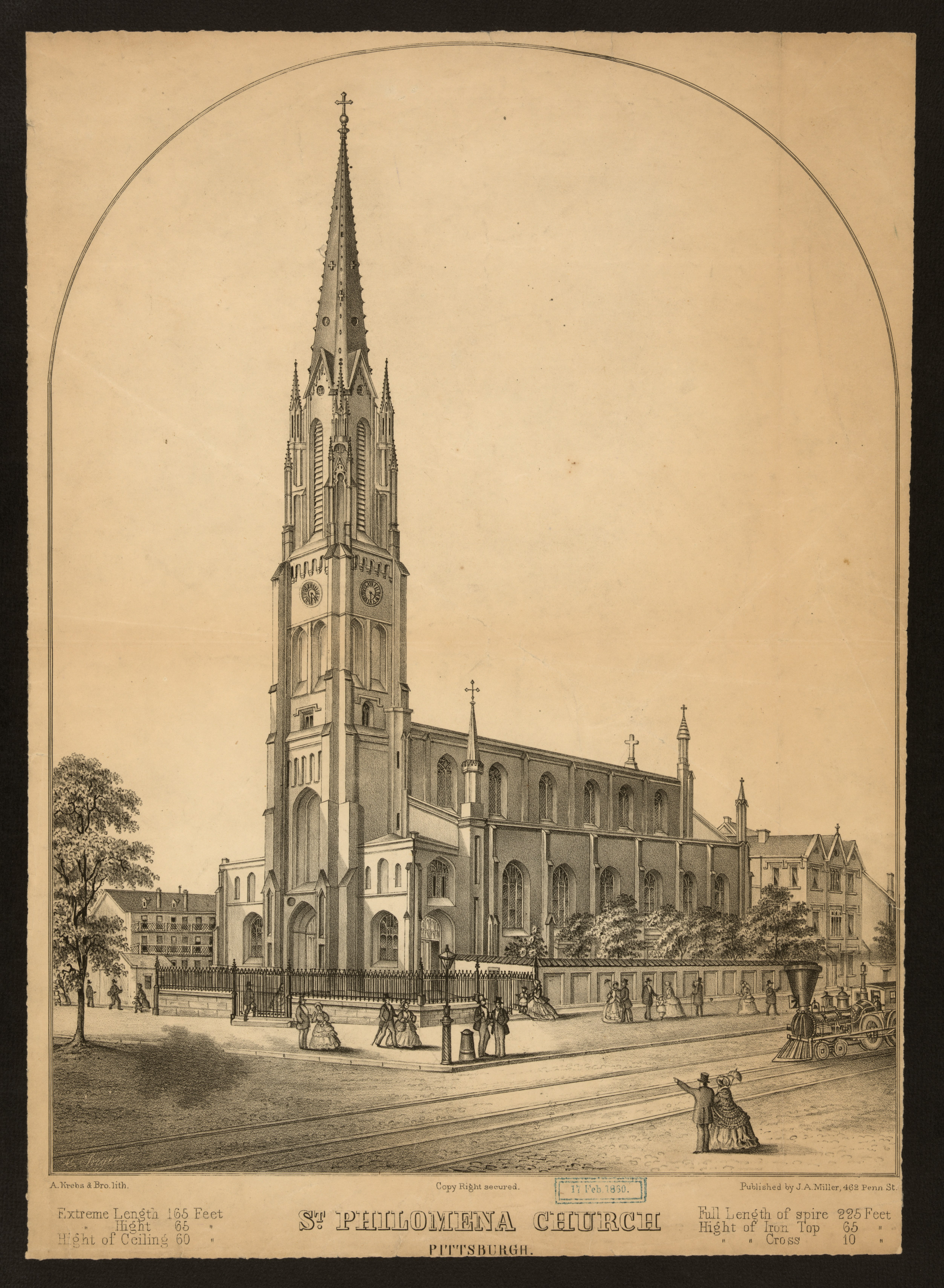
- St. Philomena's Church lithograph, 1859
- St. Philomena's Church
- Location: Pittsburgh, Pennsylvania
- Denomination: Roman Catholic

History
- Status: Former parish church within the Roman Catholic Diocese of Pittsburgh
- Founded: 1921 (parish origin dates to 1839)

Administration
- Diocese: Roman Catholic Diocese of Pittsburgh

St. Philomena's Church was a Roman Catholic parish originally located in Pittsburgh's Strip District within the Diocese of Pittsburgh. Although this church was formally established in 1921, the origin of the parish dates to 1839.

== Description ==
During the 19th Century, the Redemptorist missionary order had a major base at this location starting in 1839, catering to the significant German population in the area. St. Philomena's was initially known as 'The Factory Church' due to being housed in an industrial warehouse, but John Neumann arrived to become head pastor and, in a matter of a few years, had a church building erected at the corner of Liberty Avenue and 14th Street. As Neumann's associate pastor, Francis Xavier Seelos also helped in serving the parish, eventually becoming pastor himself until being transferred in 1854. Thus, St. Philomena's is notable for having housed two people recognized in the Catholic beatification process (Neumann having been declared a saint in 1977).

As the expansion of industrialization and commercialism occurred in the early 20th century, the church's location was no longer viable, and the building was sold to the Pennsylvania Railroad in 1922 and eventually torn down. The Parish was then relocated to Pittsburgh's Squirrel Hill neighborhood eventually housed in a building designed by architect John T. Comes. The funeral services of famed boxers Harry Greb and Billy Conn occurred at the parish.

As time progressed, the gradual loss of population caused the church to be closed and the parish to be contracted.
