= Saints Peter and Paul Church (Pittsburgh) =

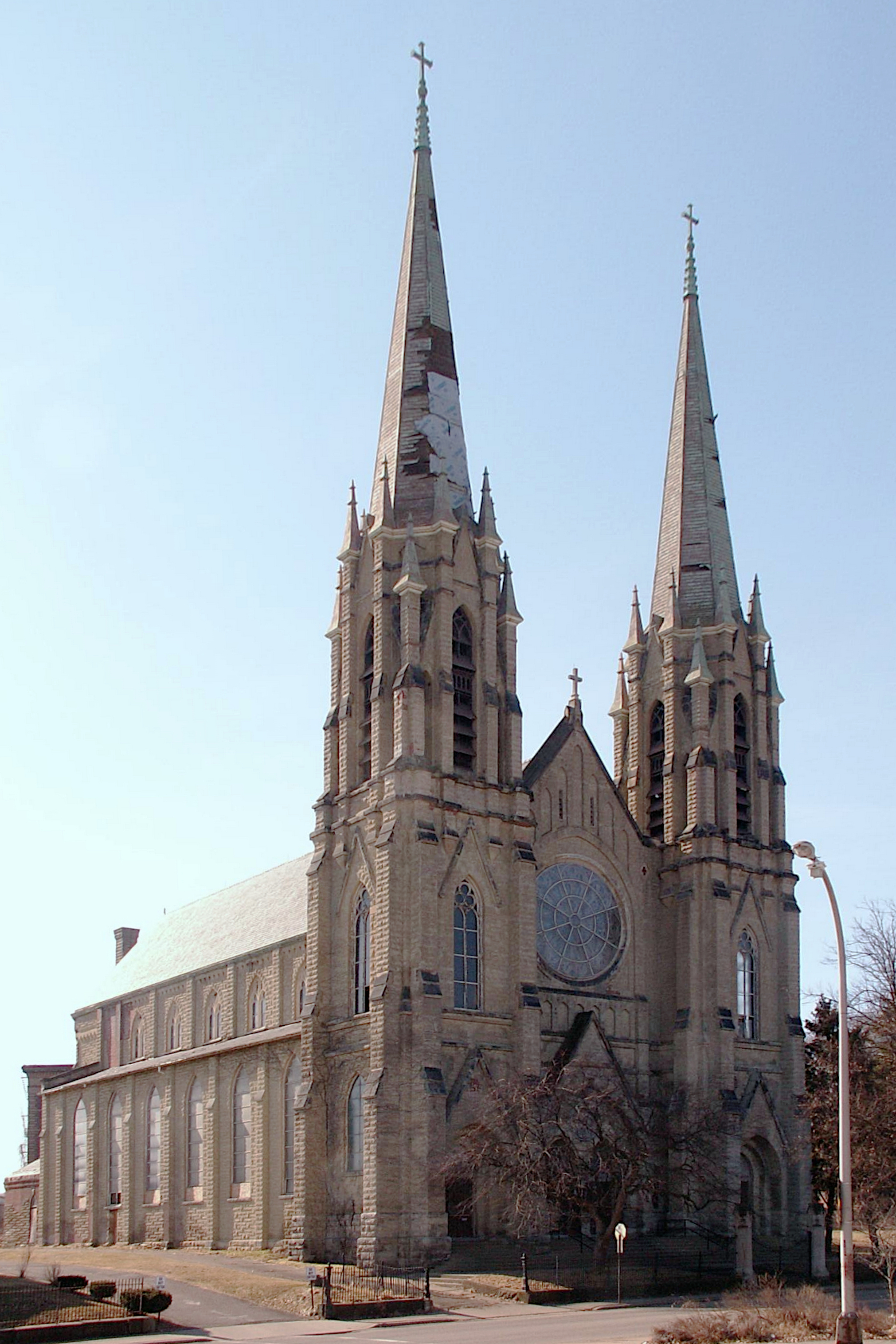
- The church in 2014
- Saints Peter and Paul Church
- 40°27′45″N 79°55′06″W
- Location: 130 Larimer Ave., East Liberty, Pittsburgh, Pennsylvania
- Country: United States
- Denomination: Roman Catholic

History
- Status: Parish church
- Dedicated: December 20, 1891; October 30, 1910 (rededicated)

Architecture
- Functional status: Vacant
- Architect(s): Adolphus Druiding, John T. Comès
- Style: Gothic Revival
- Years built: 1890–91
- Construction cost: $102,000
- Closed: 1992

Specifications
- Capacity: 1,500
- Length: 170 feet (52 m)
- Width: 60 feet (18 m); 85 feet (26 m) (incl. towers)
- Height: 82 feet 9 inches (25.22 m)

Administration
- Diocese: Roman Catholic Diocese of Pittsburgh
- Parish: Saints Peter and Paul

Saints Peter and Paul Church is a historic former Roman Catholic church in the East Liberty neighborhood of Pittsburgh, Pennsylvania. It is often referred to colloquially as the "Dogma Church" because of its appearance in the climactic scene of the 1999 Kevin Smith film Dogma. The church was built in 1890–91 and was designed by Adolphus Druiding. After being badly damaged in a fire in 1909, the interior and roof were rebuilt under the supervision of architect John T. Comès and the church was rededicated in 1910. It closed in 1992 and has remained vacant since. In 1983, the church was designated as a Pittsburgh Landmark by the Pittsburgh History & Landmarks Foundation (PHLF).

== History ==
Saints Peter and Paul was a German parish established in 1857. The first church was completed in 1859 but was in poor condition by the 1880s. It was demolished in 1890 and work began on the present church shortly after. The cornerstone was laid on August 10, 1890, and the finished building was dedicated by Bishop Richard Phelan on December 20, 1891.

On August 5, 1909, the church was struck by lightning, igniting a fire that destroyed the inside of the building. The Pittsburgh Gazette Times reported:

The electric bolt struck the church at 6:15 o'clock [p.m.] between the two huge towers and shattered the immense organ in its descent. A cloud of smoke arose and in a few seconds flames broke from the huge front memorial window and shot out into the street fifty feet. The hail and rainstorm was at its height...

Joseph Suehr, the church's pastor, wrote,

Hastening with Father Schuler into the church I beheld the organ one sheet of flame. Its destruction was inevitable. I looked up to the arches of the ceiling and perceived the roof construction from the ventilator in the middle of the church to the front wall to be on fire, and that there was no hope to save the structure.

Nuns and firefighters were able to save some of the most valuable items from the church, including the altar, but the interior and roof needed to be completely rebuilt. The total cost of repairs was $85,000, almost as much as the initial construction, but was mostly covered by insurance. The building was rededicated by Bishop Regis Canevin on October 30, 1910.

Due to population loss in the Diocese of Pittsburgh, Saints Peter and Paul was merged with five other East End parishes in 1992 to form St. Charles Lwanga Parish. Three of the churches, Holy Rosary and Mother of Good Counsel in Homewood and Our Lady of the Most Blessed Sacrament in East Hills, remained open, while Saints Peter and Paul, Our Lady Help of Christians in Larimer, and Corpus Christi in Lincoln–Lemington–Belmar were closed. The church was sold in 1997 and has been vacant since.

In 2018, it was placed under the conservatorship of a nonprofit community development organization, East Liberty Development, Inc. (ELDI), which has been trying to find a way to reuse the structure. In 2022, a feasibility study commissioned by ELDI concluded that the church could be viably renovated as a multi-purpose events space for a cost of about $15 million.

== Architecture ==
Saints Peter and Paul was designed in the Gothic Revival style and is attributed to Adolphus Druiding, of Chicago, while local architect John T. Comès was responsible for the 1910 reconstruction. Both architects specialized in Catholic churches. The main body of the church is rectangular in plan, 170 feet (52 m) long by 60 feet (18 m) wide, with a central nave and side aisles. The nave is 82 feet 9 inches (25.22 m) high at the center and includes a clerestory. The front elevation of the church includes two towers with 200-foot (61 m) spires.

The rebuilding by Comès resulted in a number of changes to the building. Suehr wrote,

The notable improvements on the exterior consist largely in removing many of the galvanized iron crockets and crosses from the towers and gables, and especially the enormous tower crosses, all of which made the front appear restless and 'overbusy,' in the changing of the old large Gothic top wooden window to a stone rose window 20 feet in diameter; in the new gable over it and the omission of useless pinnacles on each side; finally in the new broad steps and wide walk with two Gothic piers, which give the building a solid looking base and a dignified approach.

Inside, the original wood and plaster columns were replaced with stone and the wooden roof was replaced with steel and reinforced concrete. This also allowed the nave ceiling to be raised by 14 feet (4.3 m).
