= St. Augustine Church (Pittsburgh) =

- U.S. Historic district – Contributing property
- Pittsburgh Landmark – PHLF
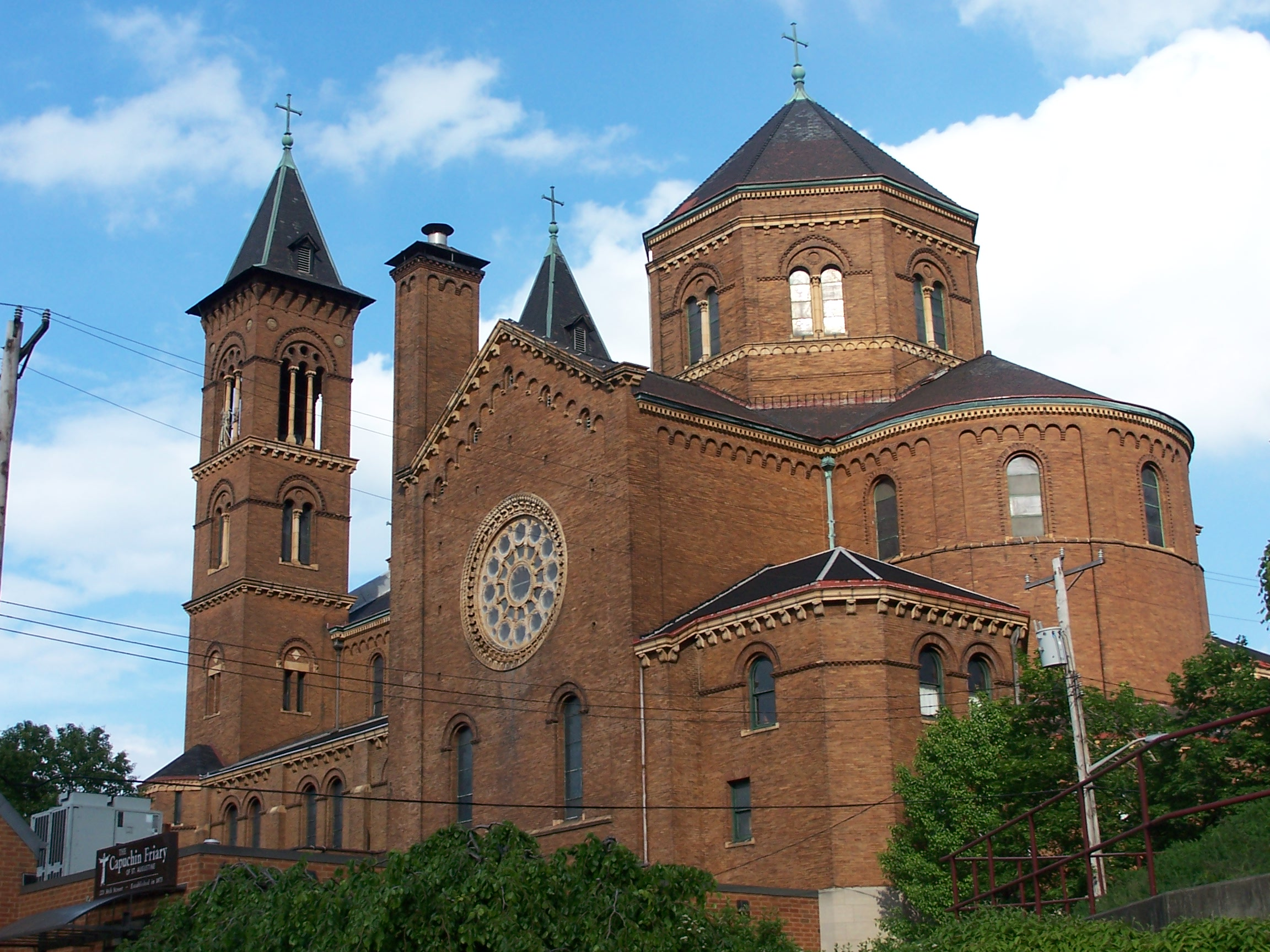
- St. Augustine Church in 2006

- Location within Pittsburgh
- Location: 225 37th Street (Lawrenceville), Pittsburgh, Pennsylvania, USA
- Coordinates: 40°27′55″N 79°57′50″W
- Built: 1901
- Architect: John T. Comès (Rutan & Russell)
- Architectural style: Romanesque Revival
- Part of: Lawrenceville Historic District (ID100004020)

Significant dates
- Designated CP: July 8, 2019
- Designated PHLF: 1998

St. Augustine Church is a historic Roman Catholic church in the Lawrenceville neighborhood of Pittsburgh, Pennsylvania. It has remained in use as a parish church since construction, currently serving Saint Pio of Pietrelcina Parish, which with St. Maria Goretti forms the Bloomfield/Garfield/Lawrenceville Grouping within the Diocese of Pittsburgh. The church has been operated by the Capuchin Friars since 1873 and is the headquarters of the Capuchin Province of St. Augustine.

The Romanesque Revival structure was designed by John T. Comès of the firm of Rutan & Russell. Built in 1901 of yellow brick with terra cotta trim, it is cruciform in plan with two tall towers, a clerestory, and a dome. It was added to the List of Pittsburgh History and Landmarks Foundation Historic Landmarks in 1998. In 2019, it was listed as a contributing property in the Lawrenceville Historic District.

== History ==
St. Augustine parish was founded in 1863 by German American residents of Lawrenceville, who had been operating a small school there for a few years. The first church was built in 1862–3 at the corner of 37th and Butler Streets. In 1873, the parish was placed under the jurisdiction of the Order of Friars Minor Capuchin. By the end of the century, the church building was in disrepair and the wealthy Frauenheim family offered a gift of $50,000 to build a new one. The chosen site was further up 37th Street, which would allow the old church to remain in use during construction. The new building was designed by John T. Comes of Rutan & Russell, who based his plans on St. Benno in Munich. The ambitious design featured twin 148-foot (45 m) towers and came in at over twice the original budget when bids were received. Fortunately for the parish, the Frauenheims were willing to increase their donation to match.

Construction started in August 1899 and the finished church was dedicated on May 12, 1901. St. Augustine parish continued to operate until 1993, when population loss in Lawrenceville forced the diocese to consolidate its parishes, some of which were only a few blocks apart. St. Augustine was merged with three other Lawrenceville parishes—Holy Family, St. John the Baptist, and St. Mary's—to form the Parish of Our Lady of Angels. St. Augustine was kept as the main church and the other three were eventually closed. Since 2023, the parish has been renamed Saint Pio of Pietrelcina Parish.

== Architecture ==
St. Augustine Church is 145 feet (44 m) long and 80 feet (24 m) wide, extending to 94 feet (29 m) at the transept, and is constructed from yellow brick with terra cotta trim. Inspired by St. Benno in Munich, it is an example of Romanesque Revival architecture with twin 148-foot (45 m) towers and a high dome. The front of the church features three large arched doorways with decorative tympana under a niche containing a 12-foot (3.7 m) statue of St. Augustine. Inside, the church has two rows of columns supporting a clerestory, with aisles on either side. The chancel is demarcated by a marble altar rail and there are five altars which were reused from the original 1863 church. The interior is also decorated with a variety of frescoes, murals, and sculptures. The windows were imported from Austria.
