= St. Mary Cemetery (Pittsburgh) =

Cemetery in Pennsylvania, US

Coordinates: 40.4685°N 79.9522°W

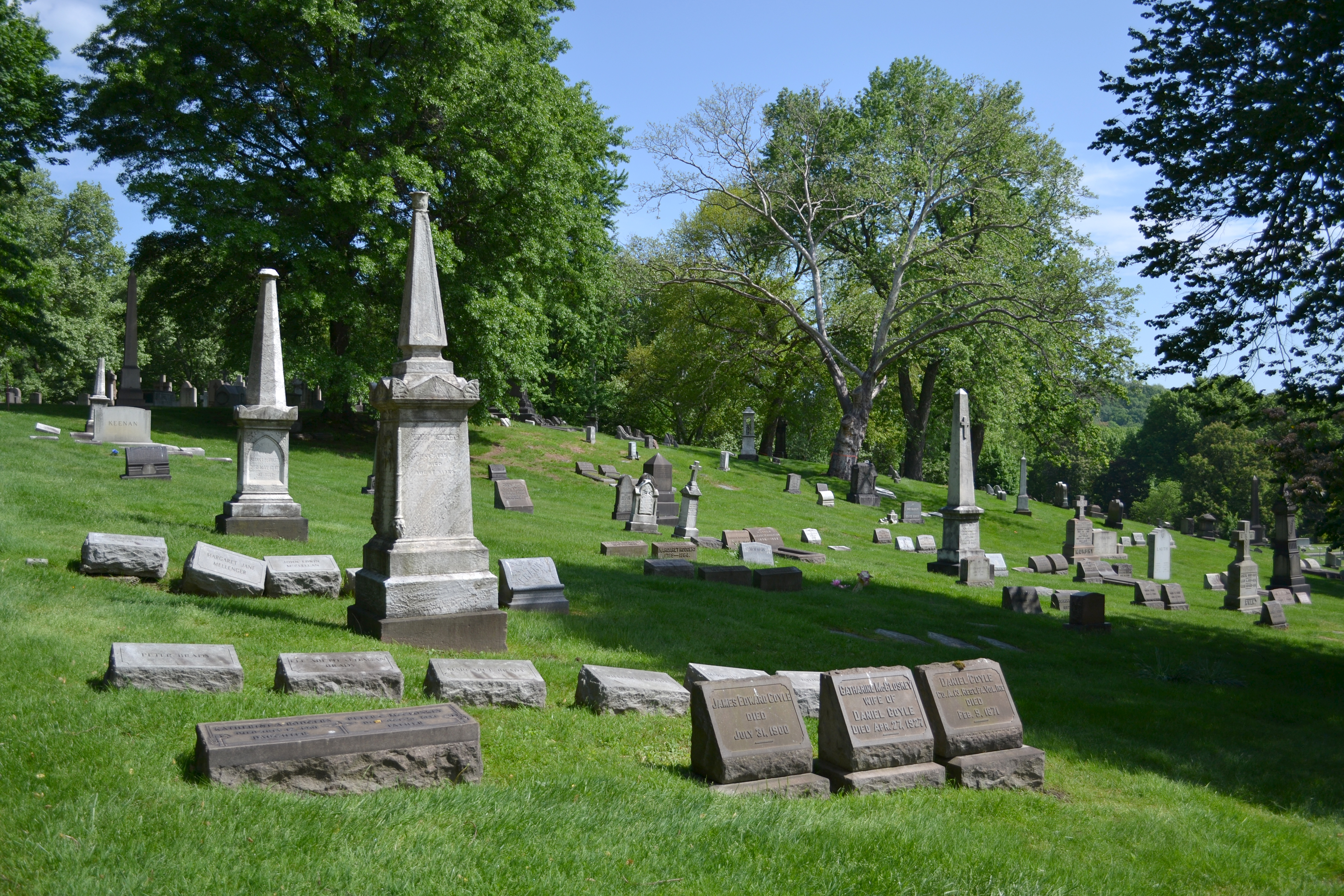
The cemetery in 2018

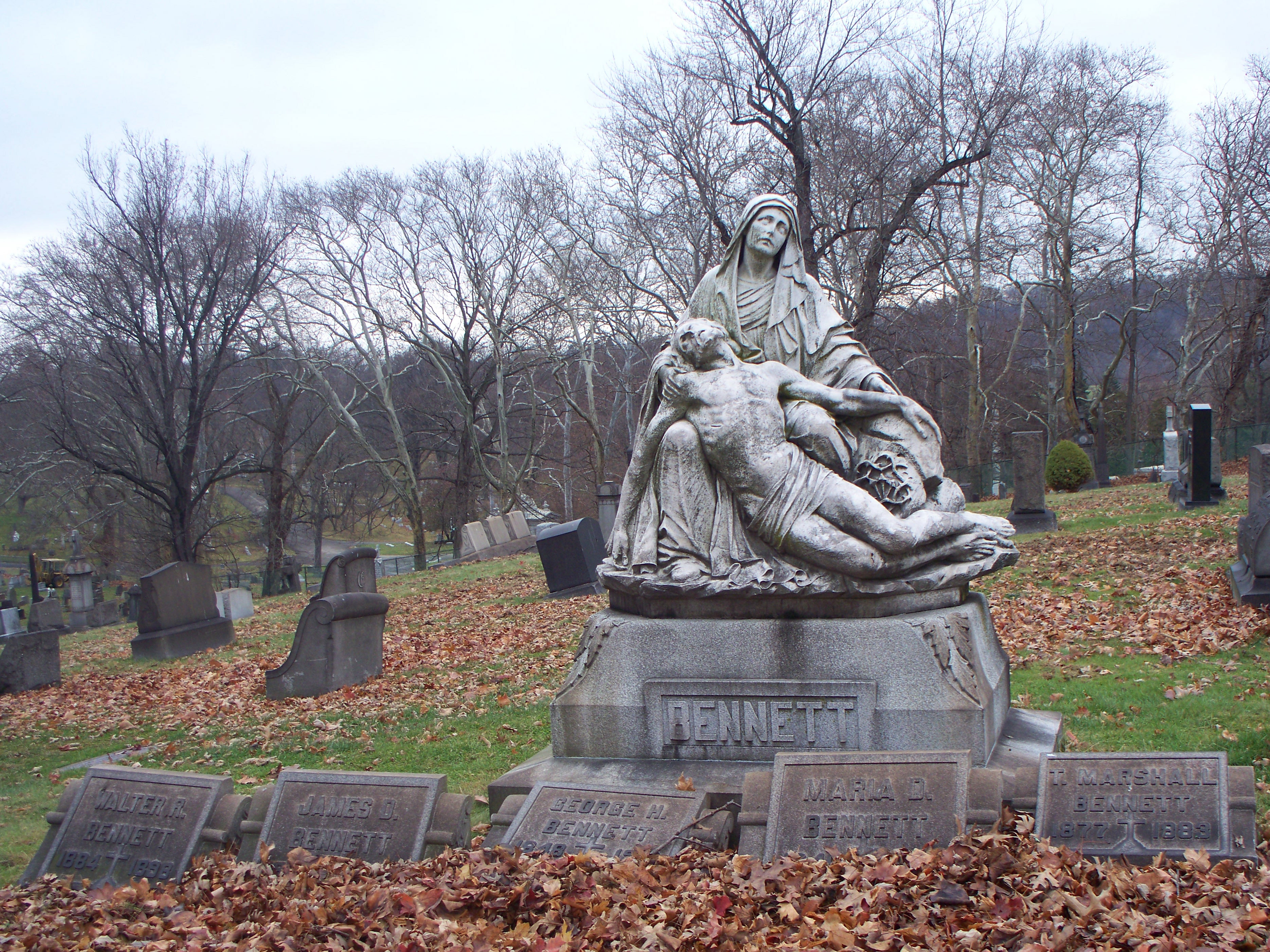
Bennett monument at St. Mary Cemetery

Saint Mary Cemetery is a Roman Catholic burial ground located at 45th and Penn Avenues in the Central Lawrenceville neighborhood of Pittsburgh, Pennsylvania, US. It is adjacent (just south) of the city's slightly older and much larger Allegheny Cemetery. A chain-link fence separates the two cemeteries.

The 44-acre (180,000 m^{2}) tract of land was established as a cemetery in 1849 at a cost of $20,000, six years after the founding of the Roman Catholic Diocese of Pittsburgh. As of 2008, it has more than 100,000 interments.

== Notable burials ==
Bishops

- Hugh Charles Boyle (1873–1950)
- Regis Canevin (1853–1927)
- Richard Phelan (1828–1904)

Others

- Joseph M. Barr, Mayor of Pittsburgh (1906–1982)
- Bartley Campbell, playwright (1843–1888)
- James B. Drew, Chief Justice of Pennsylvania (1877–1953)
- Thomas Enright, soldier (1887–1917)
- Andrew Arnold Lambing, priest-historian (1842–1918)
- Bernard J. McKenna, Mayor of Pittsburgh (1842–1903)
- Thomas Meighan, early film star (1879–1936)

== See also ==
- Saint Mary's Academy Building
- St. Mary's Church (Pittsburgh)
