= St. James Church (Pittsburgh) =

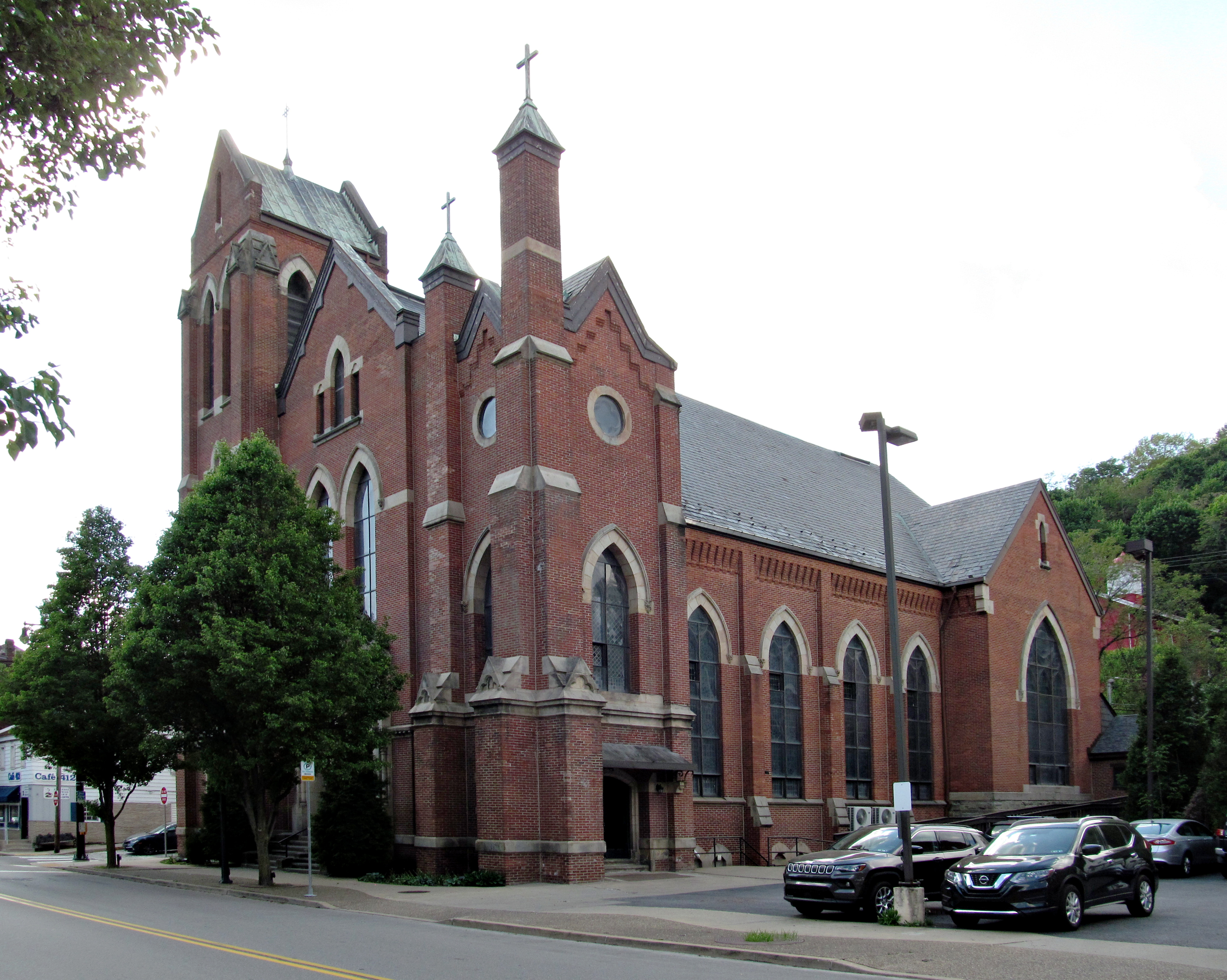
- St. James Church
- 40.4417°N 80.0328°W
- Location: 326 S. Main Street, Pittsburgh, PA
- Denomination: Society of St. Pius X
- Previous denomination: Catholic Church

History
- Founder: Fr. James McGowan
- Dedication: 24 February 1884
- Other dedication: 28 March 2014

Architecture
- Style: Brick Gothic

Administration
- District: United States, SSPX

Clergy
- Pastor: Fr. Richard Brueggemann

St. James Church is a church in the West End neighborhood of Pittsburgh, Pennsylvania, United States. Founded as a Catholic parish of the Diocese of Pittsburgh in 1853, the current Brick Gothic church was built in 1884, and served as a parish church for 120 years until its closure in 2004. Deconsecrated and sold, it subsequently housed an art gallery for ten years, before it was acquired by the Society of Saint Pius X in August 2014 and then restored to active use.

== History ==
=== Founding (1854-1884) ===
Prior to the founding of the parish, the Catholics residing in the Saw Mill Run valley (what became the West End Village, then known as Temperanceville) had to either cross the Ohio River to attend Mass at Saint Paul Cathedral or St. Phillip's Church in Crafton (then a part of Upper St. Clair Township). By spring 1853, the population had grown such that a parish had to be founded, with territory taken from the two neighboring parishes. Men of the congregation solicited donations to begin construction, and the first Mass in the unfinished church was celebrated on Christmas of 1853, and the first building was fully completed and placed under the patronage of St. James the Great. The congregation opened a school, staffed by Sisters of Charity in the basement of the church in 1870, and a rectory was added in 1871.

=== New complex and renaissance (1884-1954) ===
By 1880, the original church building had been outgrown, and construction of a new building began that year. The cornerstone was laid by bishop John Tuigg in September 1882 and the current Brick Gothic church was completed and dedicated in February 1884.

The parish continued to grow, and completed a new school in September 1916. After the 2004 closure of the parish, this building was eventually acquired in 2013 by Pittsburgh Musical Theater, who have since renamed it the Gargaro Theater and who maintain it to this day.

The church building was severely damaged by the 1927 Pittsburgh gas explosion, forcing the replacement of most of the windows and the temporary celebration of Mass in the school auditorium.

=== Decline and closure (1970-2004) ===
The parish was merged with neighboring St. Martin's in 1994 to form Guardian Angels Parish due to changing demographics in the area. Inspections in 2004 found the church to be unsafe, and a celebration of the Liturgy of the Hours on May 16 of that year was the last worship service held in the church while it was in the possession of the Diocese of Pittsburgh.

== Traditionalist enclave ==
Meanwhile, after Bishop Vincent Leonard officially implemented the Mass of Paul VI on May 4, 1970, a handful of traditionalist Catholics began to seek out priests that would continue to offer the Tridentine Mass in Pittsburgh.

One group leased the abandoned St. Sava’s Serbian Orthodox Church, buying the building in 1977. In December 1996, the group (now under priests of the SSPX) relocated to the former E.L. Shepherd Elementary School in nearby Collier Township.

Although the school building was in a pleasant location and had ample classrooms and land, Mass had to be celebrated in the old gym of the school. As the parish was growing quite rapidly, it became necessary to begin looking for a purpose-built church for the congregation.

== SSPX takeover and restoration (2014-present) ==
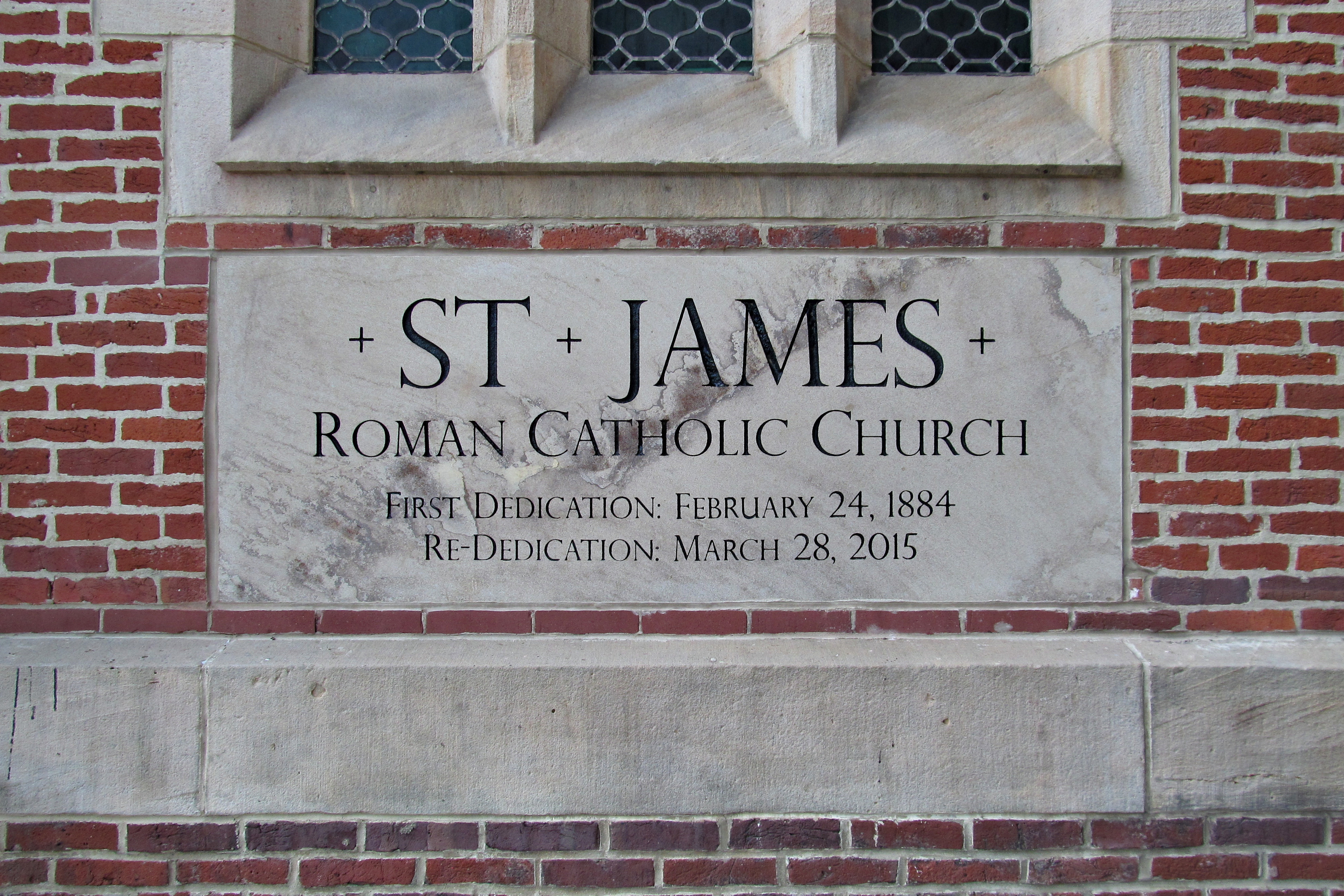
New cornerstone commemorating the rededication of the church in 2015.

Regarding the rededication of the church, the Pittsburgh Catholic, the official newspaper of the Diocese of Pittsburgh, printed the following statement:

The Society of Saint Pius X is not in full communion with the Catholic Church. The society does not have canonical status in the Catholic Church. Pope Emeritus Benedict XVI stated: “As long as the society does not have a canonical status in the church, its ministers do not exercise legitimate ministries in the church.” Catholics who wish to celebrate the sacraments in the extraordinary form of the liturgy are encouraged to participate in the newly formed St. John XXIII Quasi-Parish on the North Side of Pittsburgh.

== List of pastors ==
- Fr. James McGowan, 1853-1854
- Fr. John B. O'Connor, 1854-1857
- Fr. Matthew Carrol, 1857-1870
- Fr. Francis L. Tobin, 1870-1889
- Fr. James A. Cosgrave, 1889-1897
- Fr. John Price, 1897-1911
- Fr. Thomas Gillen, 1911-1941
- Fr. Thomas Brown, 1941-
- Fr. James A. Spelman, 1968 - ?
- [to be sourced]
- Fr. John Hissrich, 1998 - 2004
- [None, 2004-2014]
- Fr. Patrick Rutledge, SSPX, 2014-2015
- Fr. Michael Brown, SSPX, 2015-2018
- Fr. Joseph Haynos, SSPX, 2018–2023
- Fr. Richard Brueggemann, SSPX, 2023–present
