= Fenelton, Pennsylvania =

Unincorporated community in Pennsylvania, US

- Unincorporated community
- Location within Pennsylvania
- Coordinates: 40°52′4.8″N 79°43′22.8″W
- Country: United States
- State: Pennsylvania
- County: Butler
- Elevation: 1,066 ft (325 m)

Population
  - Estimate (2023): 39
- Time zone: UTC-5 (Eastern (EST))
  - Summer (DST): UTC-4 (EDT)
- ZIP code: 16034
- Area codes: 724, 878
- GNIS feature ID: 2830789

Fenelton is an unincorporated community in Butler County, Pennsylvania, United States. The community is located 9 miles (14 km) east of Butler.

== Geography ==
Fenelton has a post office with ZIP code 16034, which opened on February 8, 1890.

== Demographics ==
Historical population
Census	Pop.	Note	%±
2023 (est.)	39

The United States Census Bureau defined Springville as a census designated place (CDP) in 2023.
