= St. Agnes Church (Pittsburgh) =

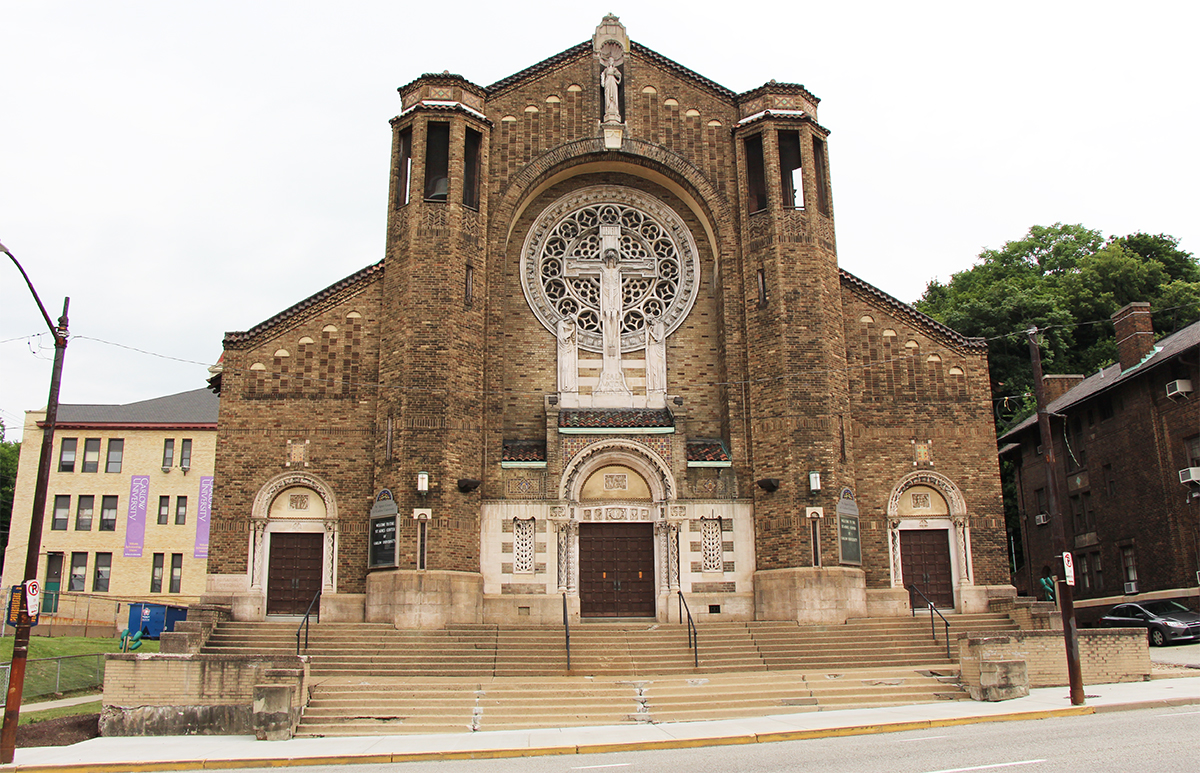
- The church in 2013

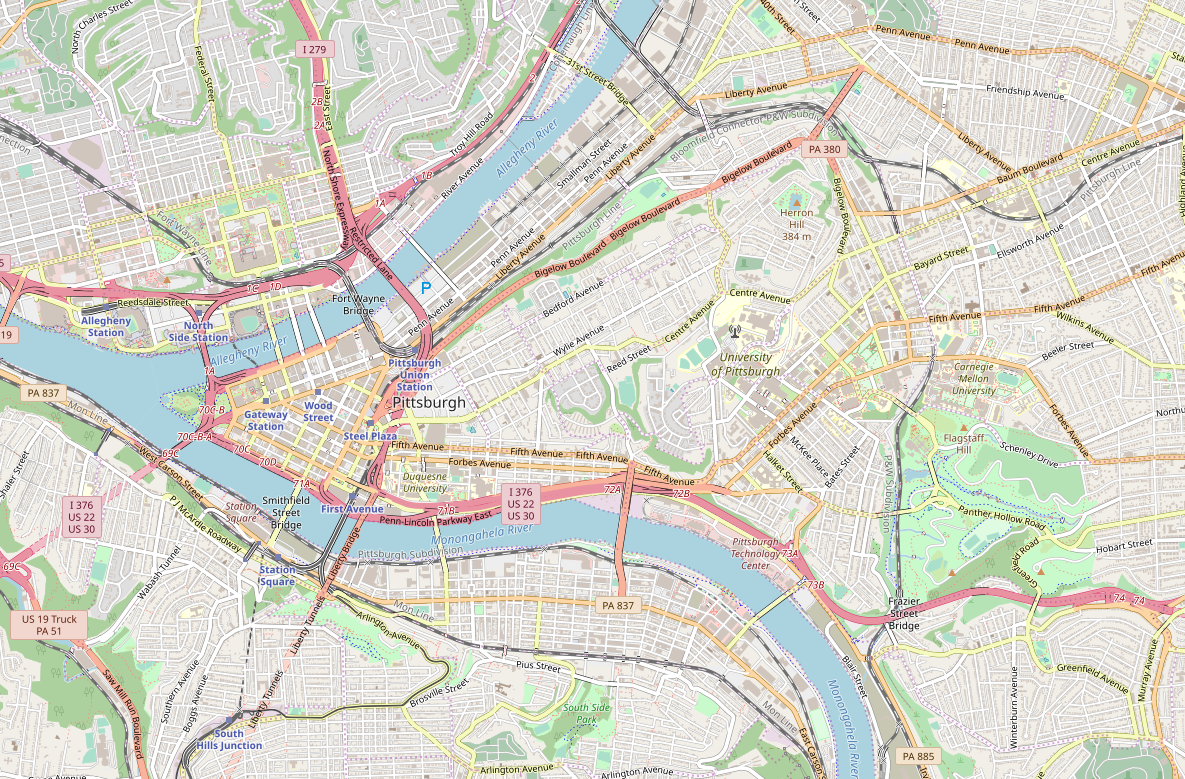
- Location of St. Agnes Church in Pittsburgh
- 40°26′17″N 79°57′53″W
- Location: 3235 Fifth Avenue, West Oakland, Pittsburgh, Pennsylvania
- Country: United States
- Denomination: Roman Catholic

History
- Status: Parish church
- Dedicated: January 28, 1917

Architecture
- Functional status: Closed
- Architect: John T. Comès
- Years built: 1916–17
- Construction cost: $125,000
- Closed: 1993

Administration
- Diocese: Roman Catholic Diocese of Pittsburgh
- Parish: St. Agnes

Site notes
- Governing body: Carlow University

St. Agnes Church is a historic former Roman Catholic church in the West Oakland neighborhood of Pittsburgh, Pennsylvania. The church was built in 1916–17 and was designed by noted Pittsburgh-based ecclesiastical architect John T. Comès. St. Agnes parish was established in 1868 and a temporary church opened in 1873 at 2400 Fifth Avenue in Uptown. This was replaced with a permanent church in 1889, but the building burned down along with several neighboring structures on January 21, 1914. Following the fire, the present church was built about 0.3 miles (0.48 km) to the east of the old location. The new building was dedicated by Bishop Regis Canevin on January 28, 1917.

Due to population loss in the Diocese of Pittsburgh, St. Agnes closed in 1993. The church and rectory were sold in 1996 to neighboring Carlow College (now Carlow University). St. Agnes was named a Pittsburgh Landmark by the Pittsburgh History & Landmarks Foundation (PHLF) in 2000, and in 2013 a Pennsylvania state historical marker was placed at the site honoring the architect, Comès. In 2020, the university announced plans to demolish the church in order to build a new 10-story health science facility. The university removed the historical marker in front of the church shortly afterward. The church was one of three sites placed on Preservation Pennsylvania's 2021 At Risk list, which highlights threats to historic buildings in Pennsylvania.

In 2022, Carlow reversed course on the demolition, with new University president Dr. Kathy Humphrey announcing a plan to restore the church and reopen it as a community gathering space, hosting academic events, cultural performances, student activities, and private events like weddings and conferences.

St. Agnes is constructed from brown brick and concrete with stone and terra cotta ornamentation including a large, stylized rose window which incorporates a relief depicting the Crucifixion. The design of the church was described by PHLF architectural historian Walter C. Kidney as "acknowledging no one historic style—Byzantine and Romanesque are both suggested—and original in its rose window and Crucifixion." The plan of the building is cruciform with side aisles and a higher nave which includes a clerestory. The columns are gray New Hampshire granite with concrete capitals. The interior is also decorated with a series of murals painted in 1931 by Felix Lieftuchter with the assistance of two Carlow art students.
