= John T. Comès =

American architect (1873–1922)

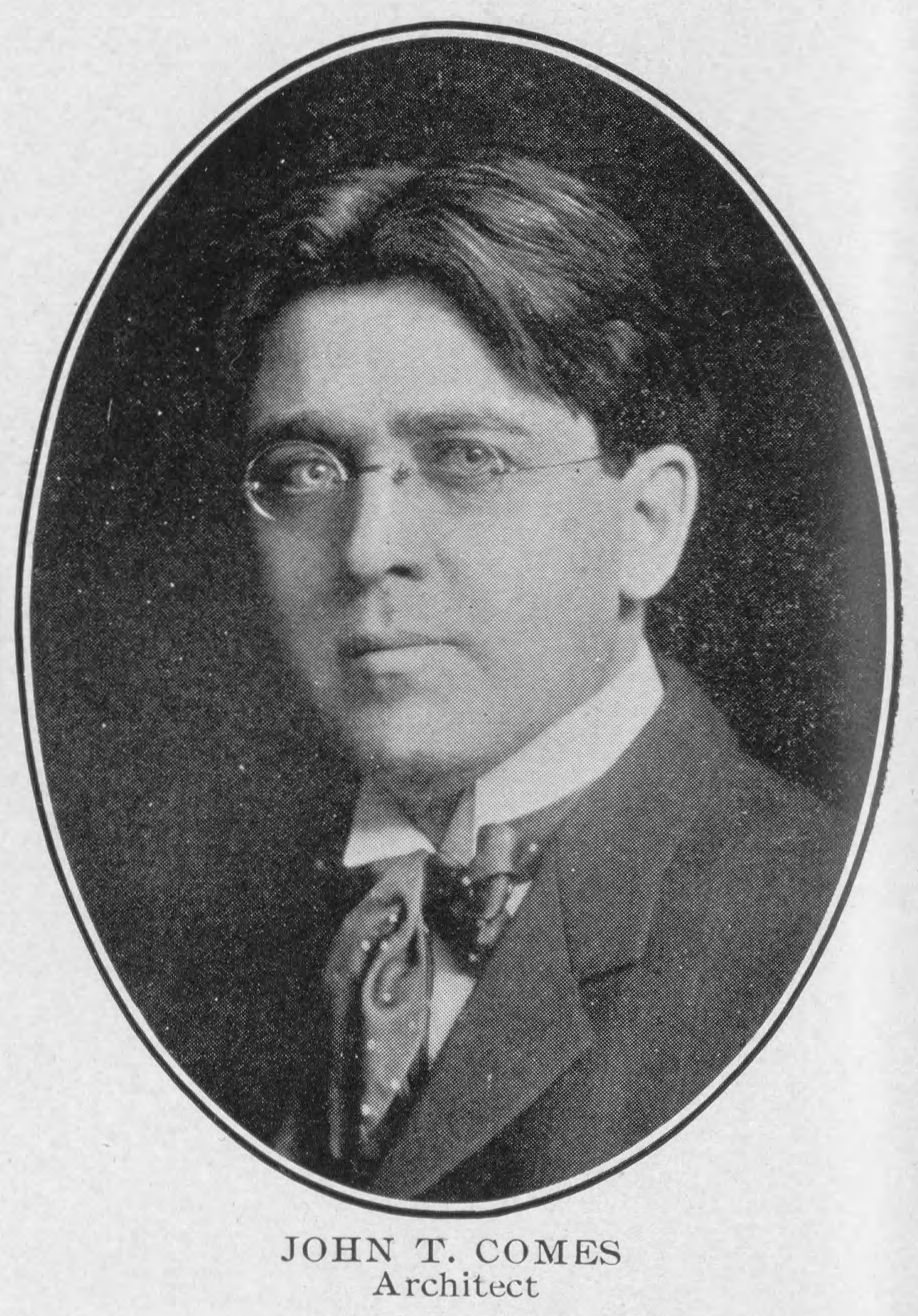
John T. Comès as depicted in Palmer's Pictorial Pittsburgh, 1905

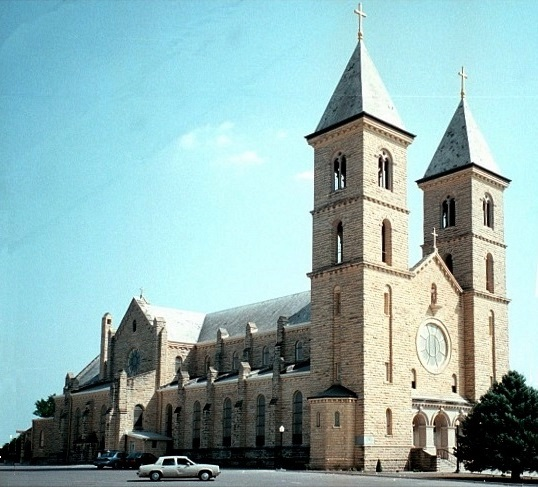
St. Fidelis Church Victoria, KS, John Theodore Comès, architect

John Theodore Comès (January 29, 1873 – April 13, 1922) was a Pittsburgh-based architect best remembered for his many buildings for Catholic communities throughout the United States.

== Childhood and architectural education ==
He was born into a family of artisans in Larochette, Luxembourg, on January 29, 1873. His father, John Richard, was an expert woodcarver, and his father's twin brother, John Adam, was a builder by trade. The family came to America when Comès was eight years old. His early education occurred in St. Paul, Minnesota, but he earned a Master of Science in architecture from Mount St. Mary's University in Emmitsburg, Maryland.

== Architectural practice ==
He came to Pittsburgh around 1897, and worked for several architectural firms before beginning his own. With the firm of Rutan and Russell, he built St. Augustine Church on 37th Street in the Lawrenceville neighborhood of Pittsburgh. With the firm of Beezer Brothers, he built St. John the Baptist Church (now the Church Brew Works and Restaurant) also in Lawrenceville; both of these churches have been named Historic Landmarks by Pittsburgh's History and Landmarks Foundation. At least three of his churches are on the National Register of Historic Places: St. Fidelis Church in Victoria, Kansas, Saint Thomas More Catholic Church (formerly St. Luke's Church) in St. Paul, Minnesota, and St. Gertrude Church in Vandergrift, Pennsylvania. Comès worked for nearly 20 years under his own name before adding two partners to form the firm of Comes, Perry and McMullen in 1921, just a year before his death.

Comès was involved in the design of four cathedrals, all of which were built in the last years of his life. He is given sole credit for the design of Christ the King Cathedral in Atlanta. He did the original design for Our Lady of the Rosary Cathedral in Toledo, Ohio, but he died during construction and the final design is attributed to his colleague, William R. Perry. The firm of Comès, Perry and McMullen is credited with the design of the Blessed Sacrament Cathedral in Greensburg, Pennsylvania, but the building was completed five years after his death. Comès is also credited with the interior design of the Cathedral of the Madeleine in Salt Lake City, which was designed by Carl M. Neuhausen and Bernard O. Mecklenburg.

Comès was author of the 1920 book Catholic Art and Architecture, which featured many of his designs.

On Sunday, January 27, 2013, the Pennsylvania Historical and Museum Commission (PHMC) dedicated a state historical marker honoring John T. Comès and recognizing his accomplishments in church architecture. The marker was placed in front of the former St. Agnes Church at Carlow University, which was designed by Comès and opened in 1917. Carlow removed the historical marker in 2020 because it planned to demolish the church.

== Family ==
John Comès was the father of notable American painter Marcella Comès Winslow.

== Selected works ==
under his own name:

- Cathedral of Christ the King, Atlanta, Georgia
- St. Paul Church, Butler, Pennsylvania
- St. Agnes Church, Cleveland, Ohio (demolished in 1975; only the bell tower remains)
- All Saints Church, Etna, Pennsylvania
- St. Michael Church, Homestead, Pennsylvania
- St. Columba Church, Johnstown, Pennsylvania
- St. Mary Church, Johnstown, Pennsylvania
- St. John the Baptist Church, Pittsburgh, Pennsylvania
- St. Augustine Church, Pittsburgh, Pennsylvania
- St. Josephat Church, Pittsburgh, Pennsylvania
- St. Philomena Church, Pittsburgh, Pennsylvania (now the Community Day School)
- St. Monica Church, Rochester, New York
- St. Mary of the Assumption Church, Oswego, New York
- St. Gertrude Church, Vandergrift, Pennsylvania
- Cathedral of the Madeleine, Salt Lake City, Utah (interior only)
- St. Fidelis Church, Victoria, Kansas
- St. Thomas More Catholic Church (formerly St. Luke's Church), St. Paul, Minnesota
- St. Mark Church, St. Paul, Minnesota
- St. Felix Church, Freedom, Pennsylvania
- St. Agnes Church, Pittsburgh, Pennsylvania (now the Carlow College Worship and Community Center)
- St. Mary Church, Hyde Park neighborhood, Cincinnati, Ohio
- St. Martin de Porres Church (formerly St. Ann Church), Toledo, Ohio
- St. Vincent de Paul Chapel (In former Kenrick Seminary), Shrewsbury, Missouri
- St. Mary Church, McKeesport, Pennsylvania (demolished 1997)

with Comes, Perry and McMullen:

- Cathedral of the Holy Rosary, Toledo, Ohio (original plans)
- Blessed Sacrament Cathedral, Greensburg, Pennsylvania
- St. Michael Archangel Church, Munhall, Pennsylvania
