= Holy Family Church (Pittsburgh) =

- U.S. Historic district – Contributing property
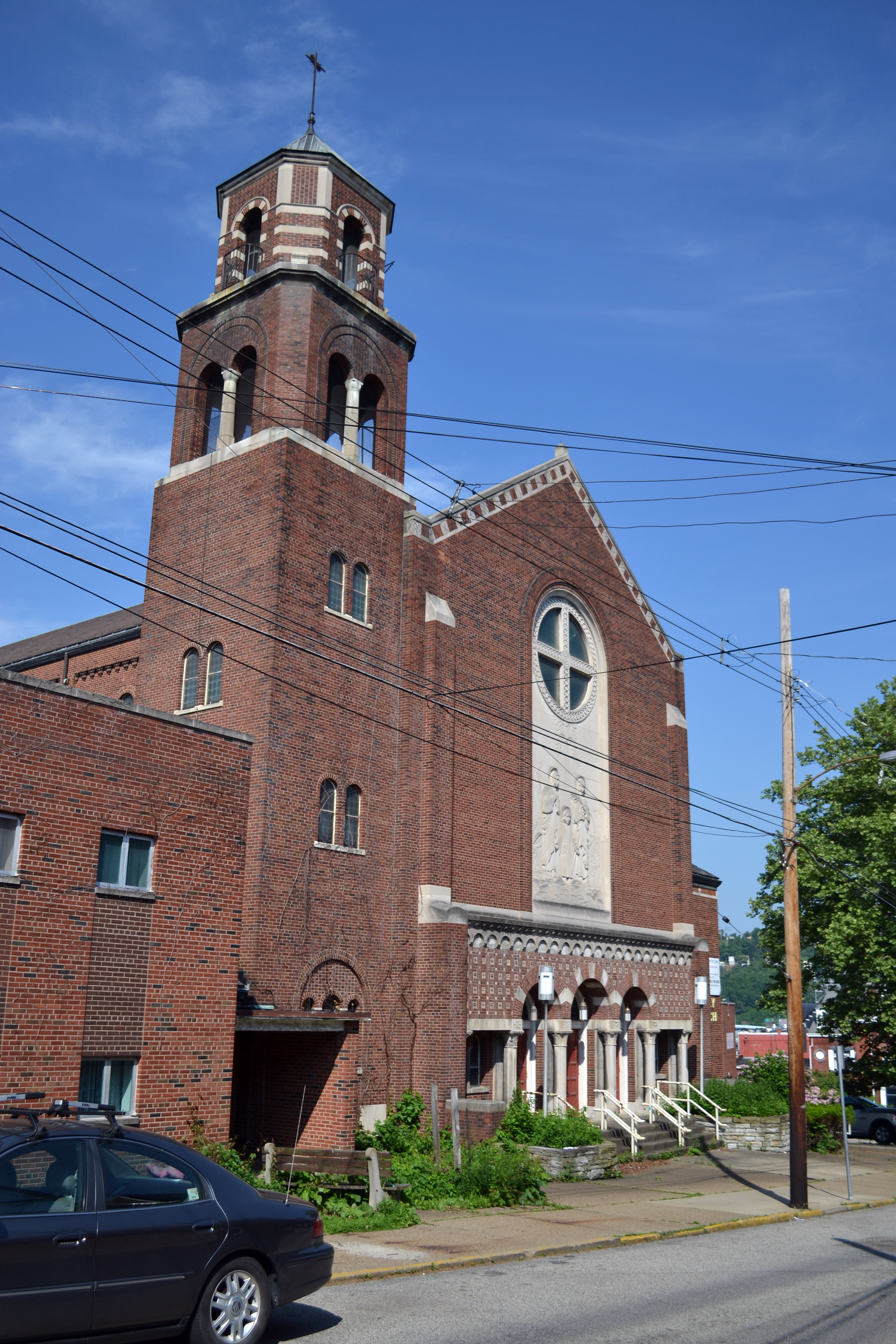
- The former church in 2018

- Location within Pittsburgh
- Location: 250 44th Street; Pittsburgh, Pennsylvania
- Coordinates: 40°28′13.33″N 79°57′30.57″W
- Built: 1940
- Architect: Antoni Pyzdrowski
- Part of: Lawrenceville Historic District (ID100004020)
- Designated CP: July 8, 2019

Holy Family Church is a historic former Roman Catholic church in the Lawrenceville neighborhood of Pittsburgh, Pennsylvania, and a contributing property in the Lawrenceville Historic District. The church was built in 1939–40 and was designed in the Romanesque Revival architectural style with modernist design principles.

== History ==
Holy Family Parish was organized in 1902 as a predominantly Polish congregation. A combination church and school was completed in 1904. When Reverend Ladislaus Sliwinski took over in 1925, the parish was over $100,000 in debt and the building was in poor condition. Revered Sliwinski cleared the debt in three years but quickly realized that the current facilities were inadequate for the size of the parish. The parish decided to develop plans to construct a new church. The parishioners split into two groups, one who wanted to build the new church on a lot across from the existing church at 41st and Foster Streets to save cost, and the other wanted to locate the church above Butler Street. They believed that above Butler Street was more desirable as it was in a residential area, it was closer to the parishioner's homes, and areas below Butler Street were being zoned as an industrial area. For these reasons the church decided on a location above Butler Street.

They purchased several properties between 1929 and 1930, despite the turmoil of the Great Depression, and retained Antoni A. Pyzdrowski as chief architect and engineer. Bishop Boyle granted the parish permission to build their new church in 1938, despite the parish incurring a serious debt. The parish began ground breaking for the new church on October 8, 1939, with the Consulate of the Republic of Poland addressing the gathering. The cornerstone was laid and Bishop Hugh C. Boyle blessed the church in January 1940, and the ceremonies were concluded with a singing of “Boze Cos Polski” (God Bless Poland). Upon completion in 1940 the Holy Family Church was the largest religious structure in Lawrenceville's ninth ward, and due to the fact that the congregation consisted largely of Polish immigrants and their descendants, it was dubbed “the Polish Cathedral”. The original church building remained in use as the parish school until 1964 and still exists, in modified form, as a residential building.

By 1948 the debt on the new church was cleared, and the inside was painted by Scatena Studio. With the changes established during Vatican II, the inside of the church was changed with the altars removed, the sanctuary area expanded, and pews arranged in a semi-circular fashion. More artwork was added from 1973 to 1985 and a mural depicting three historical epics was added. In 1993 Bishop Donald Wuerl reorganized and consolidated the parishes in Pittsburgh. This led to the end of Holy Family as a parish as it was merged into Our Lady of the Angels parish. The church continued to be used as a site of worship until 2008 when it was discontinued. The church was nominated in June 2018 to become a City Historic Landmark by Preservation Pittsburgh. As of 2021, the church was planned to be converted into 25 residential units. The exterior would be kept mostly intact with the addition of some windows and balconies.

== Architecture ==
The church was designed by Polish architect Antoni A. Pyzdrowski. The Holy Family Church stands out amongst his works by being one of the few works he did in the ecclesiastical architectural style. The building is specifically representative of the late Romanesque Revival style, a subset of the eclectic period. This period was notable for incorporating twentieth century design principles while sampling from periods of the past. The Holy Family Church's historical basis comes from the German Rundbogenstil style. The church is a rare example of pre-World War II architecture with the fusing of modern design principles and historical sampling.
