= The Church Brew Works =

Brewpub in Pittsbugth, Pennsylvania, U.S.

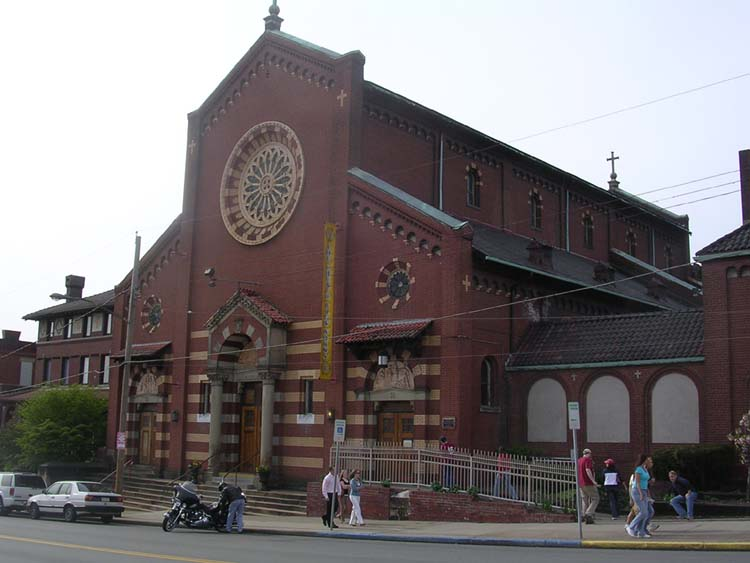
- Industry: Alcoholic beverage
- Founded: 1996
- Headquarters: 3525 Liberty Avenue, Pittsburgh, Pennsylvania
- Products: Beer

Pittsburgh Landmark – PHLF
- Official name: Church Brew Works (former St. John the Baptist Roman Catholic Church)
- Designated: 2001
- Built: 1902-1903
- Architect: Beezer Brothers
- Website: www.churchbrew.com

The Church Brew Works is a brewpub in Pittsburgh, Pennsylvania, United States, set in the confines of a restored Roman Catholic church (formerly St. John the Baptist Church).

The brewpub is located at 3525 Liberty Avenue in the Lawrenceville neighborhood of Pittsburgh, Pennsylvania. The church building was originally built in 1902, and had been used as a church until 1993. Its doors opened as The Church Brew Works on August 1, 1996, after the building underwent extensive renovation, necessitated by years of lying dormant after being officially deconsecrated by the Diocese of Pittsburgh in 1993.

In 2012, Pittsburgh Magazine named it one of the best breweries in Pittsburgh.

== Beers ==
As of September 2007, three flagship brews are locally distributed: Celestial Gold (light lager), Pipe Organ Pale Ale (English pale ale), and Pious Monk Dunkel (Munich-style dark lager). The in-house selection is rounded out by a rotating Stout, four seasonals or specialties, and one varying cask-conditioned ale. Also available are Millennium Trippel, a Belgian Tripel (in champagne bottles and 5L minikegs) and Cherry Quadzilla, a Belgian Quadrupel (champagne bottles only).

The Church's beers are brewed on a steam-jacketed 15bbl system built by Specific Mechanical Systems, Ltd. of Victoria, British Columbia.

== Awards ==
In 2012 the Church Brew Works won the Great American Beer Festival's Large Brewpub Brewer of the Year Award.

== Local historic landmark status ==
In 2001, the Church Brew Works was listed on the Pittsburgh History and Landmarks Foundation's List of Historic Landmarks.

== Gallery ==
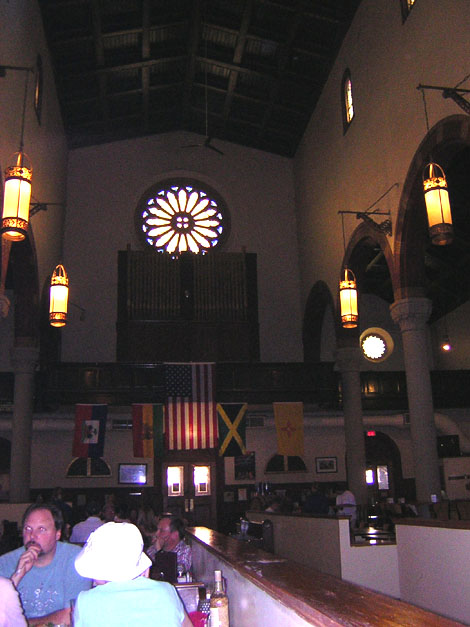
Interior view of The Church Brew Works.

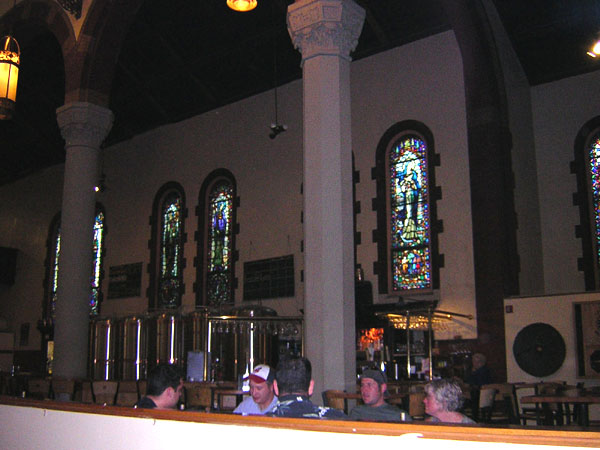
Interior view of The Church Brew Works.
