= Regina Pacis statue =

Statue of Our Lady of Peace by Guido Galli

Regina Pacis
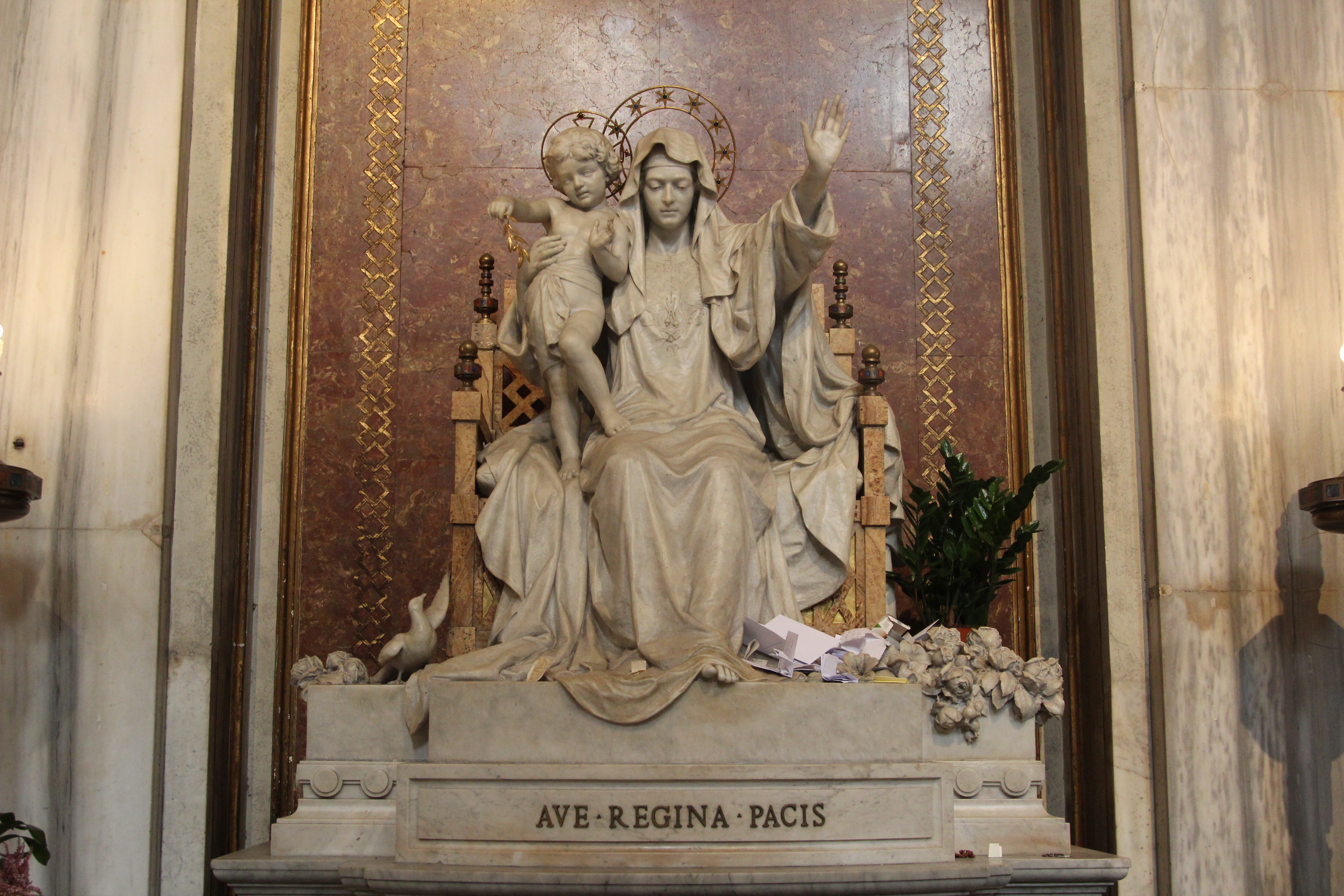
- Artist: Guido Galli
- Year: 1918
- Medium: Seravalle Marble
- Location: Santa Maria Maggiore, Rome, Italy

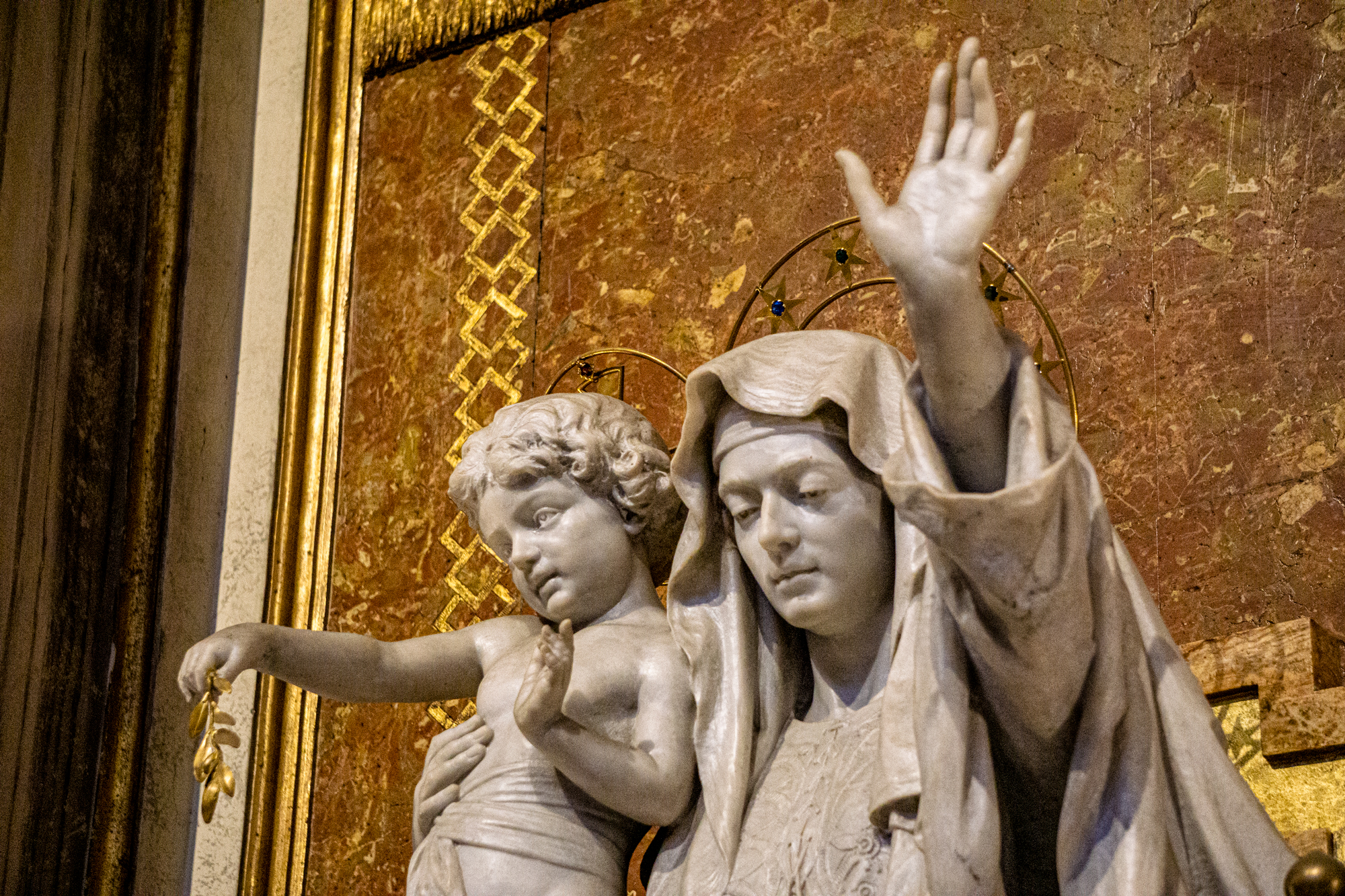
A closeup of the statue

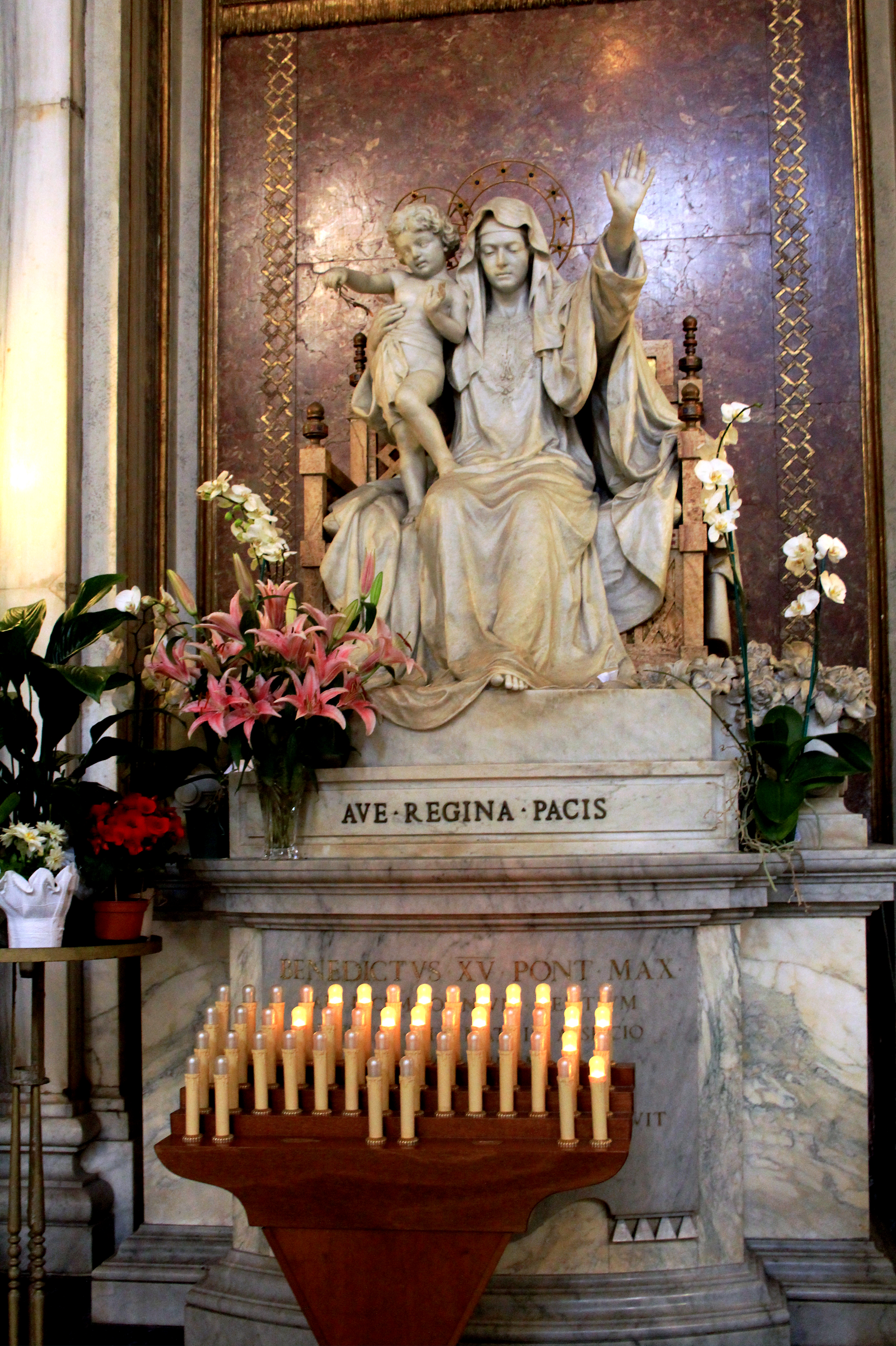
The statue on top of its base. The inscription is partially obscured by a votive candle stand

Regina Pacis is a marble statue carved in Rome by the Italian sculptor Guido Galli. It depicts Our Lady of Peace, a title given to the Virgin Mary.

The statue was commissioned by Pope Benedict XV during World War I, as a devotional appeal to the Virgin Mary for the end of the war, which he described as a "useless slaughter". The sculpture was created by Guido Galli, who was the deputy director of the Vatican Museums at the time. Regina Pacis was inaugurated on August 4, 1918, three months before World War I ended (November 11, 1918). It is currently located in the left aisle of the nave of the Basilica of Saint Mary Major.

== Description ==
The statue depicts the Virgin Mary seated on a polychrome marble throne, reminiscent of the Seat of Wisdom. Her left hand is raised, as if calling for the end of the war, whilst her gaze is downcast and sorrowful. In her left hand, she carries the Christ Child who dangles an olive branch, which symbolises peace. A dove, which is a symbol of the Holy Spirit is resting on the base, with one of its wings upstretched to Jesus. Marble flowers of roses and lilies lie on the other side of the throne. Mary's dress also features arabesque carvings around her bodice.

Mary and Jesus are also both adorned with their respective halos in gold; the cruciform halo around Jesus and the halo of twelve stars around Mary.

== Inscriptions ==
The bottom of the statue bears the inscription: Ave Regina Pacis, which translates to "Hail, Queen of Peace".

Additionally, the baroque base the statue rests on contains the inscription: Benedictus XV Pont. Max. ad pacem omnium gentium Augustae Dei Matris auspicio revocandam in aede Mariana principi orbis catholici pietati proposuit anno MDCCCCXVIII.

This translates to "Pope Benedict XV, Supreme Pontiff, presented this Marian shrine to the devotion of the Catholic world, under the auspices of the august Mother of God, for the restoration of peace among all nations, in the year 1918.”

== Pope Francis ==
On May 31, 2022, Pope Francis laid a garland of flowers in front of the statue and prayed the rosary to "offer a sign of hope to the world, suffering from the conflict in Ukraine". He was accompanied by members of the Vatican Gendarmerie Corps and the Pontifical Swiss Guard, and representatives of the Marian Ardent Youth (Gioventù Ardente Mariana).
