= Giacomo Stella =

Italian painter

Giacomo Stella was an Italian painter of the late-Renaissance or Mannerist period, active mainly in Rome.

Born in Brescia, he left for Rome as a young man in 1572, during the papacy of Gregory XIII, and still remained in Rome after 1644. He worked under Cesare Nebbia in the decoration of the Capella Sistina in Santa Maria Maggiore. He returned to Brescia and died at the age of 85 years. A son of Giacomo, Ludovico was both a musician and painter.
