= Santa Maria Maggiore =

Rome Catholic basilica and landmark in Rome, Italy

Basilica of Saint Mary the Great Basilica di Santa Maria Maggiore
- Papal Basilica of Saint Mary Major
- Basilica Papale di Santa Maria Maggiore (Italian); Basilica Sanctae Mariae Maioris (Latin); Basilica Sanctae Mariae ad Nives (Latin)
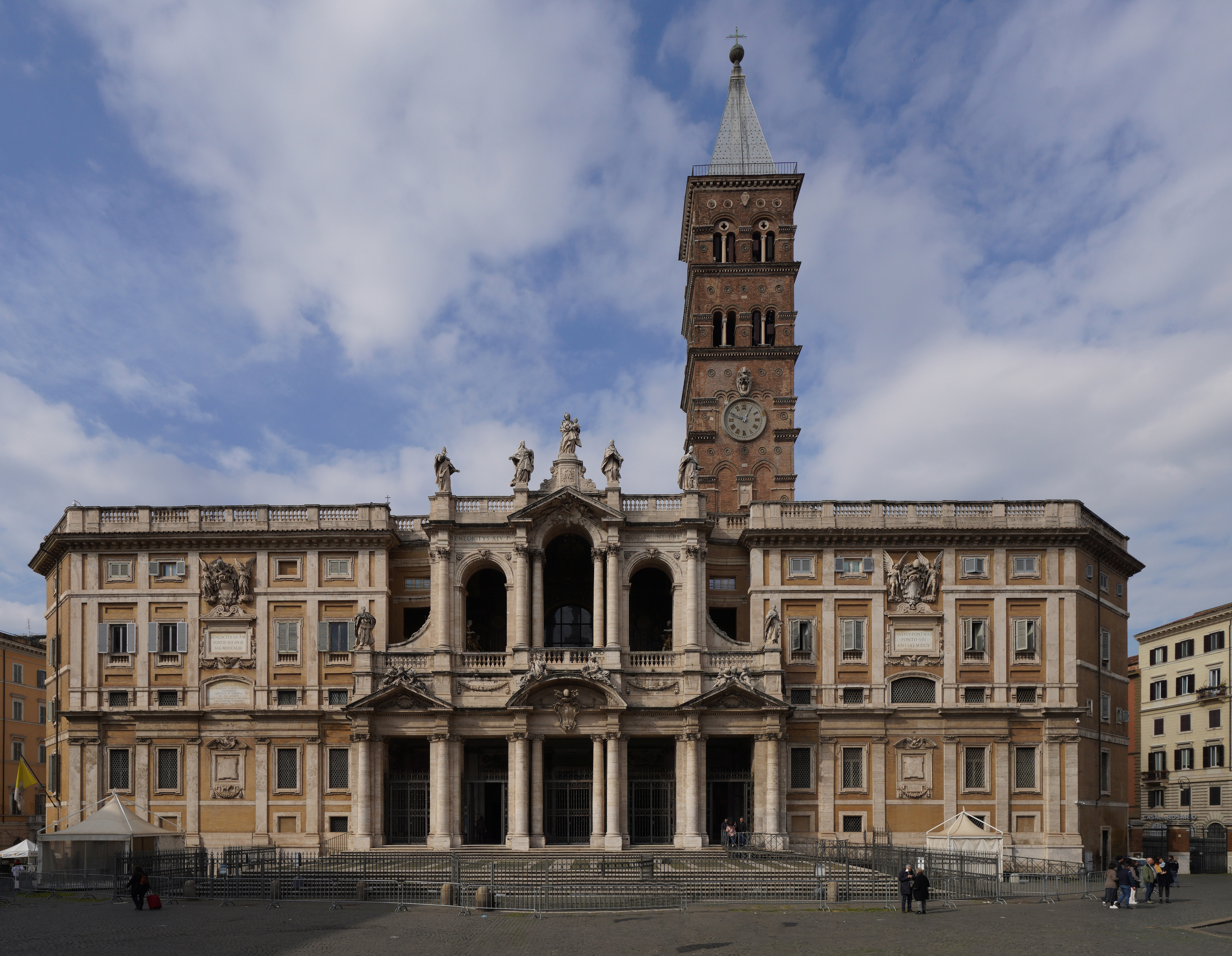
- Façade of the Basilica di Santa Maria Maggiore facing the Piazza
- Interactive map of Santa Maria Maggiore's location in Rome
- 41°53′51″N 12°29′55″E
- Location: Rome
- Country: Italy
- Denomination: Catholic Church
- Tradition: Latin Church
- Website: Santa Maria Maggiore

History
- Status: Papal major basilica
- Dedication: Blessed Virgin Mary: Jerome

Architecture
- Architect: Ferdinando Fuga
- Architectural type: Basilica
- Style: Roman architecture; Romanesque architecture (tower); Baroque architecture
- Groundbreaking: 432
- Completed: 1743

Specifications
- Length: 92 m (302 ft)
- Width: 80 m (260 ft)
- Height: 75 m (246 ft)

Administration
- Diocese: Rome

Clergy
- Bishop: Pope Leo XIV
- Rector: Archpriest of the Basilica of Santa Maria Maggiore; Cardinal Rolandas Makrickas

UNESCO World Heritage Site
- Official name: Historic Centre of Rome, the Properties of the Holy See in that City Enjoying Extraterritorial Rights and San Paolo Fuori le Mura
- Type: Cultural
- Criteria: i, ii, iii, iv, vi
- Designated: 1980
- Reference no.: 91
- Region: Europe and North America

The Papal Basilica of Saint Mary the Great (Italian pronunciation: [ˈsanta maˈriːa madˈdʒoːre]), (Note: The church is also referred to as Santa Maria delle Nevi, Santa Maria Maggiore, from the Latin Sancta Maria ad Nives, literally 'Saint Mary of the Snows'.) also informally known as the Basilica of Saint Mary Major, (Note: Italian: Basilica di Santa Maria Maggiore; Latin: Basilica Sanctae Mariae Maioris or Basilica Sanctae Mariae ad Nives. The official name seems to vary: the Holy See Press Office uses "Papal Liberian Basilica of Saint Mary Major in Rome" in English in a 2011 note Archived 3 March 2013 at the Wayback Machine, while the official Vatican site for the Basilica uses various formulas not including "Liberian" or Liberiana, some under a coat of arms that includes basilica Liberiana in Italian.) is a Roman Catholic Papal Basilica and one of the Seven Pilgrim Churches of Rome. The largest Marian church in Rome, it is regarded as the first Marian sanctuary and the mother of all Marian shrines. The shrine is dedicated to the Blessed Virgin Mary under the title of Our Lady of the Snow.

The Papal basilica is located in Piazza dell'Esquilino at the 15th administrative Rione district. Pursuant to the Lateran Treaty of 1929 between the Holy See and Italy, the basilica is in Italy and not Vatican City. However, as a property of the Holy See, Italy is obliged to protect its ownership and to concede to it "the immunity granted by international law to the headquarters of the diplomatic agents of foreign states". The shrine is designated a basilica by the privilege of immemorial status.

The basilica enshrines several notable Christian relics, most notably the holy crib of the Child Jesus and the venerated image of Salus Populi Romani, depicting the Madonna and Child as both the patroness and protectress of the Roman peoples. Pope Gregory XVI granted the image a Pontifical decree of canonical coronation via the Papal bull Cælestis Regina Maxima in 15 August 1838.

== Historicity ==
The Basilica is sometimes referred to as Our Lady of the Snows, a name given to it in the Roman Missal from 1568 to 1969 in connection with the liturgical feast of the anniversary of its dedication on 5 August, a feast that was then denominated Dedicatio Sanctae Mariae ad Nives ('Dedication of Saint Mary of the Snows'). This name for the basilica had become popular in the 14th century in connection with a legend that c. 352, during "the pontificate of Liberius, a Roman patrician John and his wife, who were without heirs, made a vow to donate their possessions to the Virgin Mary." The couple prayed that she might make known to them how they were to dispose of their property in her honor. On 5 August, at the height of the Roman summer, snow fell during the night on the summit of the Esquiline Hill. In obedience to a vision of the Virgin Mary which they had the same night, the couple built a basilica in honor of Mary on the very spot which was covered with snow.

The legend is first reported only after AD 1000. It may be implied in what the Liber Pontificalis of the early 13th century says of Pope Liberius: "He built the basilica of his own name near the Macellum of Livia". It is shown in the early 15th-century painting of the Miracle of the Snow by Masolino da Panicale. (Note: This triptych painted around 1423 was commissioned for the basilica by a member of the Colonna family; it is now in the Museo di Capodimonte, Naples (Paul Joannides, "The Colonna Triptych by Masolino and Masaccio," Arte Cristiana no. 728 (1988:339–)). The miracle is depicted as witnessed by a crowd of men and women, with Jesus and the Virgin Mary observing from above.)

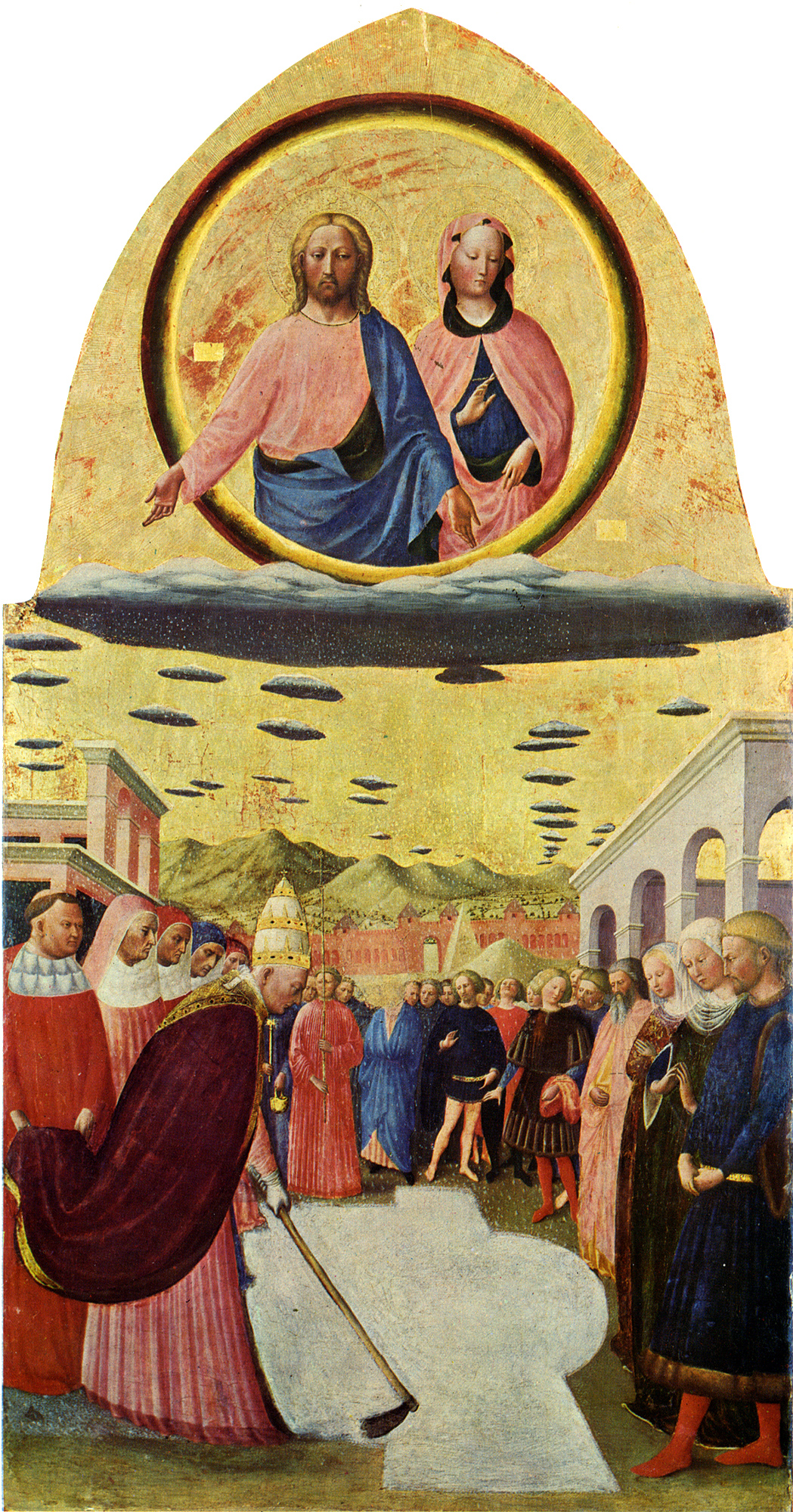
The Blessed Virgin Mary overlooking Pope Liberius scrapes the outline of the foundation of the basilica into the snow. By Italian artist Masolino da Panicale, circa 15th century, Museo di Capodimonte.

The feast was originally called Dedicatio Sanctae Mariae ('Dedication of Saint Mary's'), and was celebrated only in Rome until it was inserted into the General Roman Calendar, with ad Nives added to its name, in 1568. A congregation appointed by Pope Benedict XIV in 1741 proposed that the reading of the legend be struck from the Office and that the feast be given its original name. No action was taken on the proposal until 1969, when the reading of the legend was removed and the feast was called In dedicatione Basilicae S. Mariae ('Dedication of the Basilica of Saint Mary'). The legend is still commemorated by dropping white rose petals from the dome during the celebration of the Mass and during the Second Vespers on the feast day.

The earliest building on the site was the Liberian Basilica or Santa Maria Liberiana, after Pope Liberius (352–366). This name may have originated from the same legend, which recounts that, like John and his wife, Pope Liberius was told in a dream of the forthcoming summer snowfall, went in procession to where it occurred and there marked out the area on which the church was to be built. Liberiana is still included in some versions of the basilica's name, and "Liberian Basilica" may be used as a contemporary as well as historical name. (Note: See for example the Holy See's press office using "Papal Liberian Basilica of St. Mary Major in Rome" in English in a 2011 note Archived 3 March 2013 at the Wayback Machine, while the official Vatican website for the church uses various formulas, some under a coat of arms that includes "basilica Liberiana" in Italian.)

On the other hand, the name "Liberian Basilica" may be independent of the legend, since, according to Pius Parsch, Pope Liberius transformed a palace of the Sicinini family into a church, which was for that reason called the "Sicinini Basilica". This building was then replaced under Pope Sixtus III (432–440) by the present structure dedicated to Mary. However, some sources say that the adaptation as a church of a pre-existing building on the site of the present basilica was done in the 420s under Pope Celestine I, the immediate predecessor of Sixtus III.

Long before the earliest traces of the story of the miraculous snow, the church now known as Santa Maria Maggiore was called "Saint Mary of the Crib" (Sancta Maria ad Praesepe), a name it was given because of its relic of the crib or manger of the Nativity of Jesus Christ, four boards of sycamore wood believed to have been brought to the church, together with a fifth, in the time of Pope Theodore I (640–649). This name appears in the Tridentine editions of the Roman Missal as the place for the pope's Mass (the station Mass) on Christmas Night, while the name "Mary Major" appears for the church of the station Mass on Christmas Day.

== As a Papal basilica ==
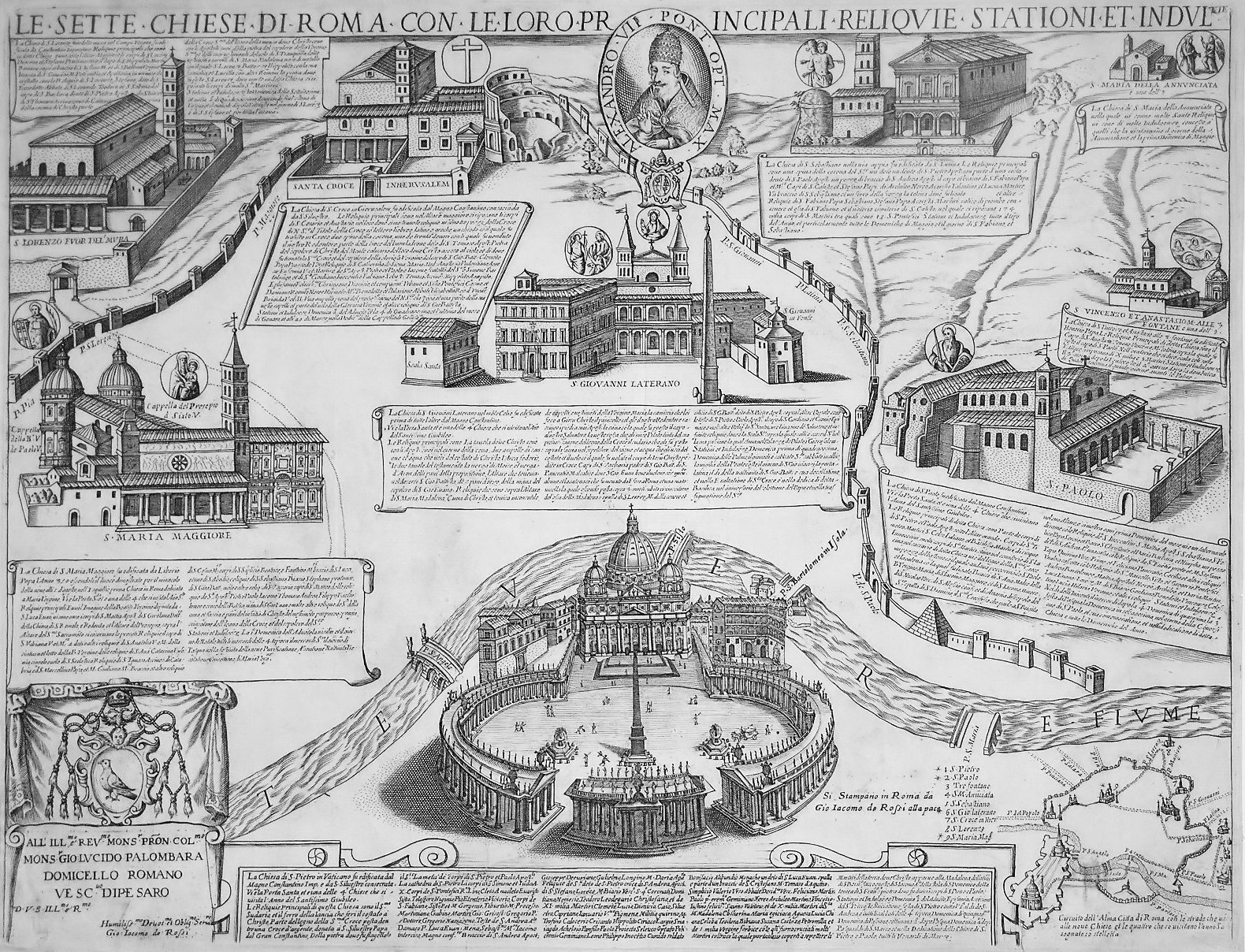
A map by Giacomo Lauro and Antonio Tempesta depicting Santa Maria Maggiore among the Seven Pilgrim Churches of Rome in 1599, in view of the Holy Year of 1600. Santa Maria is at centre-left.

A Catholic church can only be honored with the title of basilica by apostolic grant or from immemorial custom. Santa Maria Maggiore is one of four that hold the title of "major basilica". The other three are the basilicas of St. John in the Lateran, St. Peter, and St. Paul outside the Walls. The title of major basilica was once used more widely, being attached, for instance, to the Basilica of St. Mary of the Angels in Assisi.

Along with the other major basilicas, Santa Maria Maggiore is also styled a "papal basilica". Before 2006, the four papal major basilicas, together with the Basilica of St. Lawrence outside the Walls were referred to as the "patriarchal basilicas" of Rome. When Pope Benedict XVI abandoned the title "Patriarch of the West", the title of Santa Maria Maggiore changed from patriarchal to papal basilica, as found on its website, and each was associated with one of the five ancient patriarchates. Santa Maria Maggiore was associated with the Patriarchate of Antioch. In 2024, Pope Francis reinstated the title, reversing Pope Benedict XVI's renunciation of it but, so far, the church designation has remained unaltered.

The five papal basilicas along with the Basilica of the Holy Cross in Jerusalem and San Sebastiano fuori le mura were the traditional Seven Pilgrim Churches of Rome, which were visited by pilgrims during their pilgrimage to Rome following a 20-kilometer (12 mi) itinerary established by Philip Neri on 25 February 1552.

== History ==
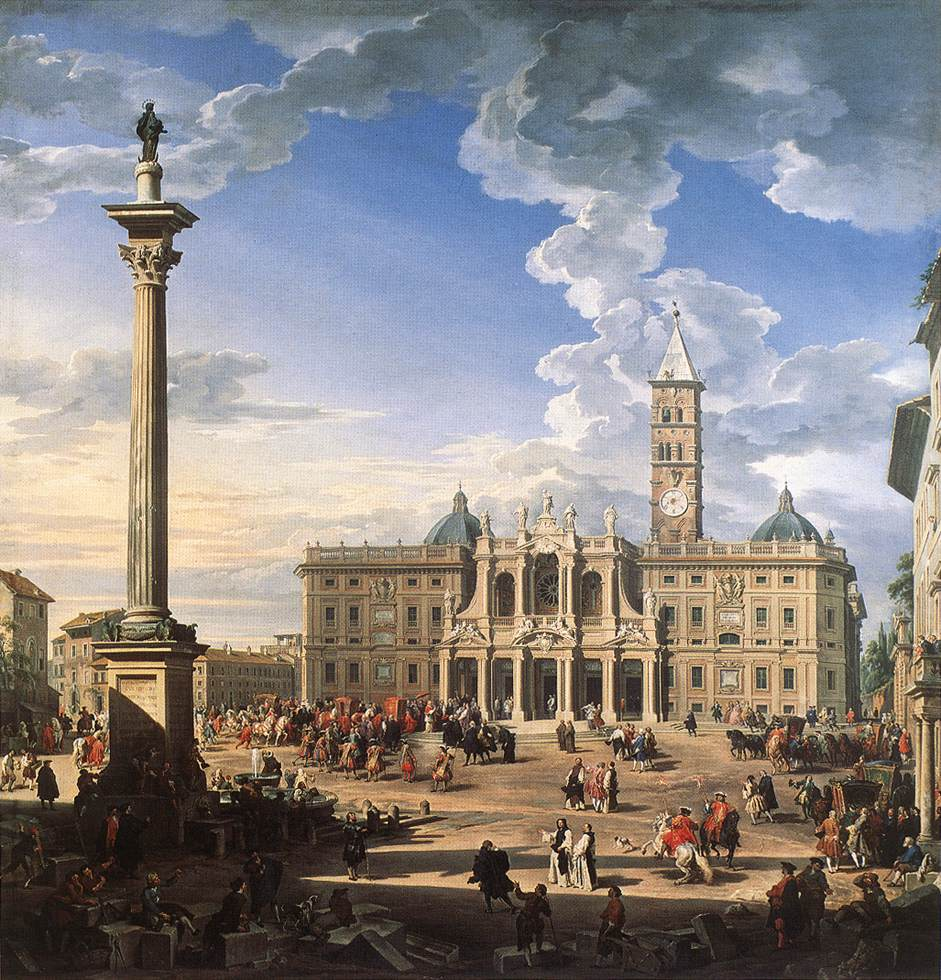
The Piazza and Church of Santa Maria Maggiore, by Giovanni Paolo Panini

It is now agreed that the present church was built on the Cispian spur of Rome's Esquiline Hill under Pope Celestine I (422–432) not under Pope Sixtus III (432–440), who consecrated the basilica on 5 August 434 to the Virgin Mary.

The dedicatory inscription on the triumphal arch, Latin: Sixtus Episcopus plebi Dei (Sixtus the bishop to the people of God), is an indication of that Pope's role in the construction. As well as this church on the summit of the Esquiline Hill, Pope Sixtus III is said to have commissioned extensive building projects throughout the city, which were continued by his successor Pope Leo I, the Great.

The church retains the core of its original structure, despite several additional construction projects and damage by the earthquake of 1348.

Church building in Rome in this period, as exemplified in Santa Maria Maggiore, was inspired by the idea of Rome being not just the center of the world of the Roman Empire, as it was seen in the classical period, but the center of the Christian world.

Santa Maria Maggiore, one of the first churches built to celebrate the Virgin Mary, was erected immediately after the Council of Ephesus of 431, which proclaimed Mary as "Mother of God" (Theotokos). Pope Sixtus III built it to commemorate this decision. Certainly, the atmosphere that generated the council gave rise also to the mosaics that adorn the interior of the dedication: "whatever the precise connection was between council and church it is clear that the planners of the decoration belong to a period of concentrated debates on nature and status of the Virgin and incarnate Christ." The magnificent mosaics of the nave and triumphal arch, seen as "milestones in the depiction" of the Virgin, depict scenes of her life and that of Christ, and scenes from the Old Testament: Moses striking the Red Sea, and Egyptians drowning in the Red Sea.

Richard Krautheimer attributes the magnificence of the work also to the abundant revenue accruing to the papacy at the time from land holdings acquired by the Catholic Church during the 4th and 5th centuries on the Italian peninsula: "Some of these holdings were locally controlled; the majority as early as the end of the 5th century were administered directly from Rome with great efficiency: a central accounting system was involved in the papal chancery; and a budget was apparently prepared, one part of the income going to the papal administration, another to the needs of the clergy, a third to the maintenance of church buildings, a fourth to charity. These fines enabled the papacy to carry out through the 5th century an ambitious building program, including Santa Maria Maggiore."

Miri Rubin believes that the building of the basilica was influenced also by seeing Mary as one who could represent the imperial ideals of classical Rome, bringing together the old Rome and the new Christian Rome: "In Rome, the city of martyrs, if no longer of emperors, Mary was a figure that could credibly carry imperial memories and representations."

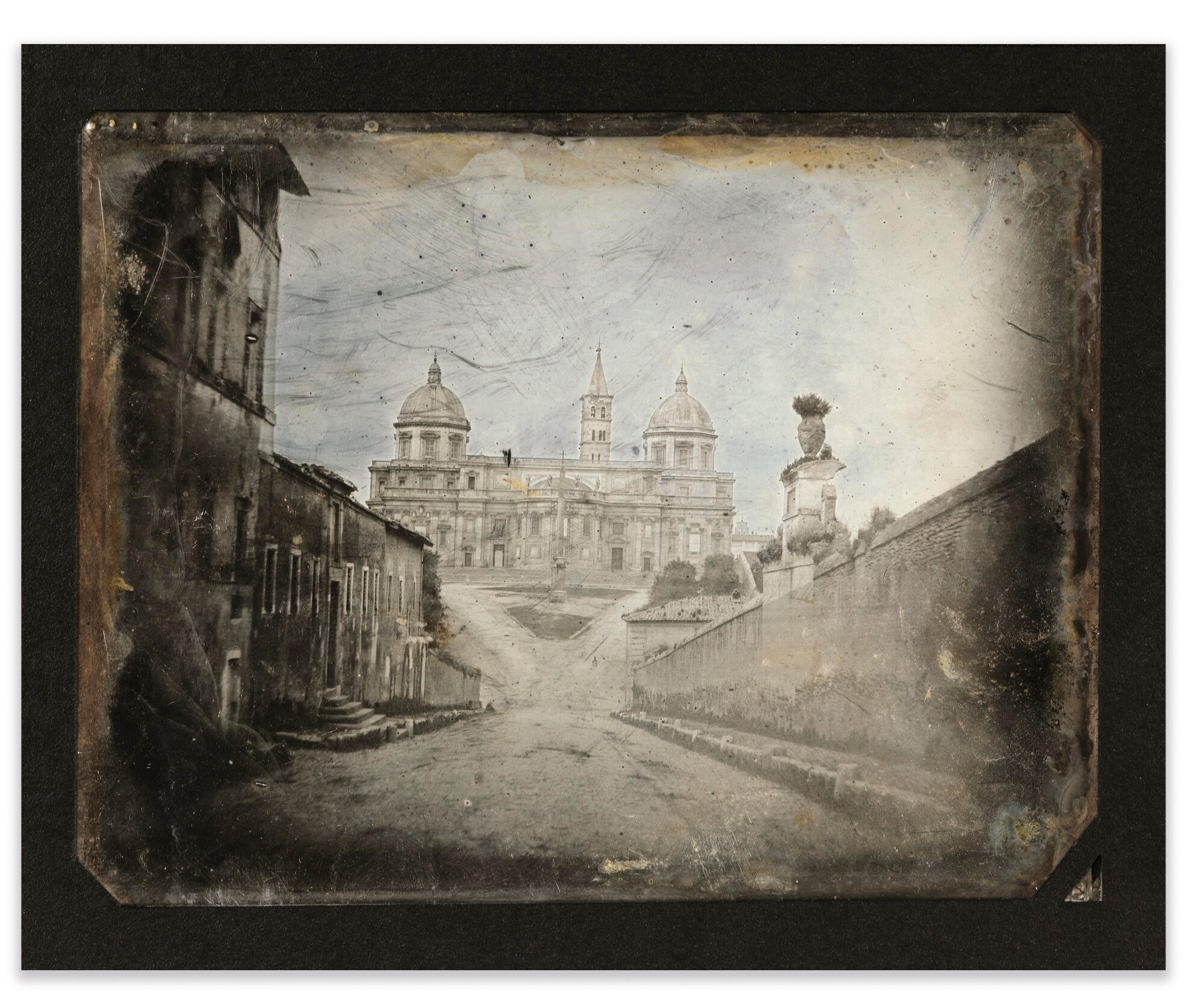
One of the earliest photographs of Santa Maria Maggiore, taken by French photographer Joseph-Philibert Girault de Prangey in 1842

Gregory the Great may have been inspired by Byzantine devotions to the Theotokos (Mother of God) when after becoming Pope during a plague in 590 that had taken the life of his predecessor, he ordered for seven processions to march through the city of Rome chanting Psalms and Kyrie Eleison, in order to appease the wrath of God. The processions began in different parts of the city, but rather than finally converging on St Peter's, who was always the traditional protector of Rome, he instead ordered the processions to converge on Santa Maria Maggiore instead.

When the popes returned to Rome after the period of the Avignon papacy, the buildings of the basilica became a temporary Palace of the Popes due to the deteriorated state of the Lateran Palace. The papal residence was later moved to the Palace of the Vatican in what is now Vatican City.

The basilica was restored, redecorated and extended by various popes, including Eugene III (1145–1153), Nicholas IV (1288–1292), Clement X (1670–1676), and Benedict XIV (1740–1758), who in the 1740s commissioned Ferdinando Fuga to build the present façade and to modify the interior. The interior of the Santa Maria Maggiore underwent a broad renovation encompassing all of its altars between the years 1575 and 1630.

In 1966, archaeologists excavating under the basilica found the remains of a Roman building including an imperial calendar with fasti and agricultural annotations and illustrations. On the basis of the calendar, the ruins have been dated to c. 200 by Salzman and to the 4th century by Magi.

In 2025, Pope Francis was buried at the basilica in the side nave between the Sforza Chapel and the Pauline Chapel.

== Architecture ==
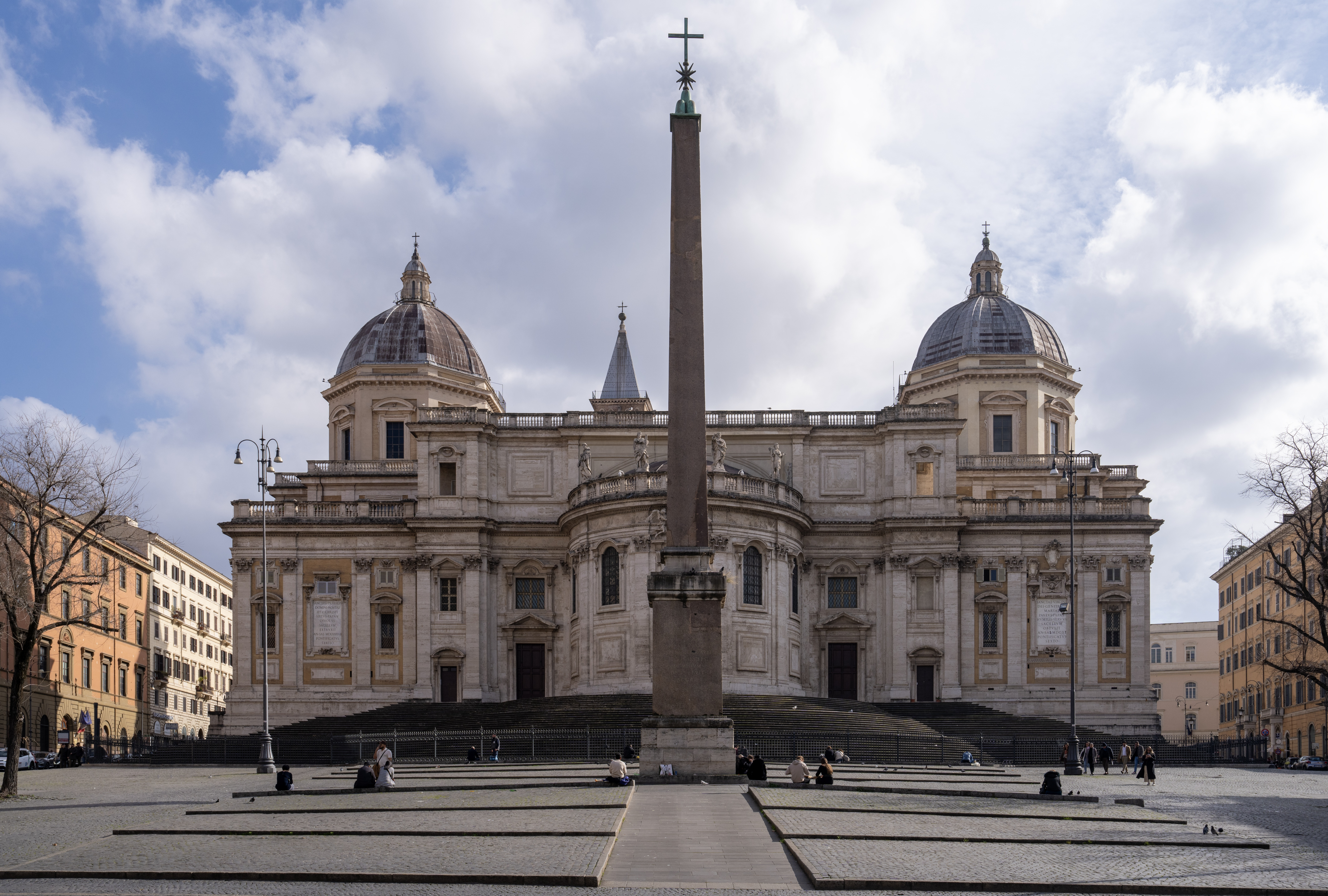
Piazza dell'Esquilino with the apse area of Santa Maria Maggiore

The original architecture of Santa Maria Maggiore was classical and traditionally Roman, perhaps to convey the idea that Santa Maria Maggiore represented old imperial Rome as well as its Christian future. As one scholar puts it, "Santa Maria Maggiore so closely resembles a second-century imperial basilica that it has sometimes been thought to have been adapted from a basilica for use as a Christian church. Its plan was based on Hellenistic principles stated by Vitruvius at the time of Augustus."

Even though Santa Maria Maggiore is immense in its area, it was built to plan. The design of the basilica was a typical one during this time in Rome: "a tall and wide nave; an aisle on either side; and a semicircular apse at the end of the nave." The key aspect that made Santa Maria Maggiore such a significant cornerstone in church building during the early 5th century were the beautiful mosaics found on the triumphal arch and nave.

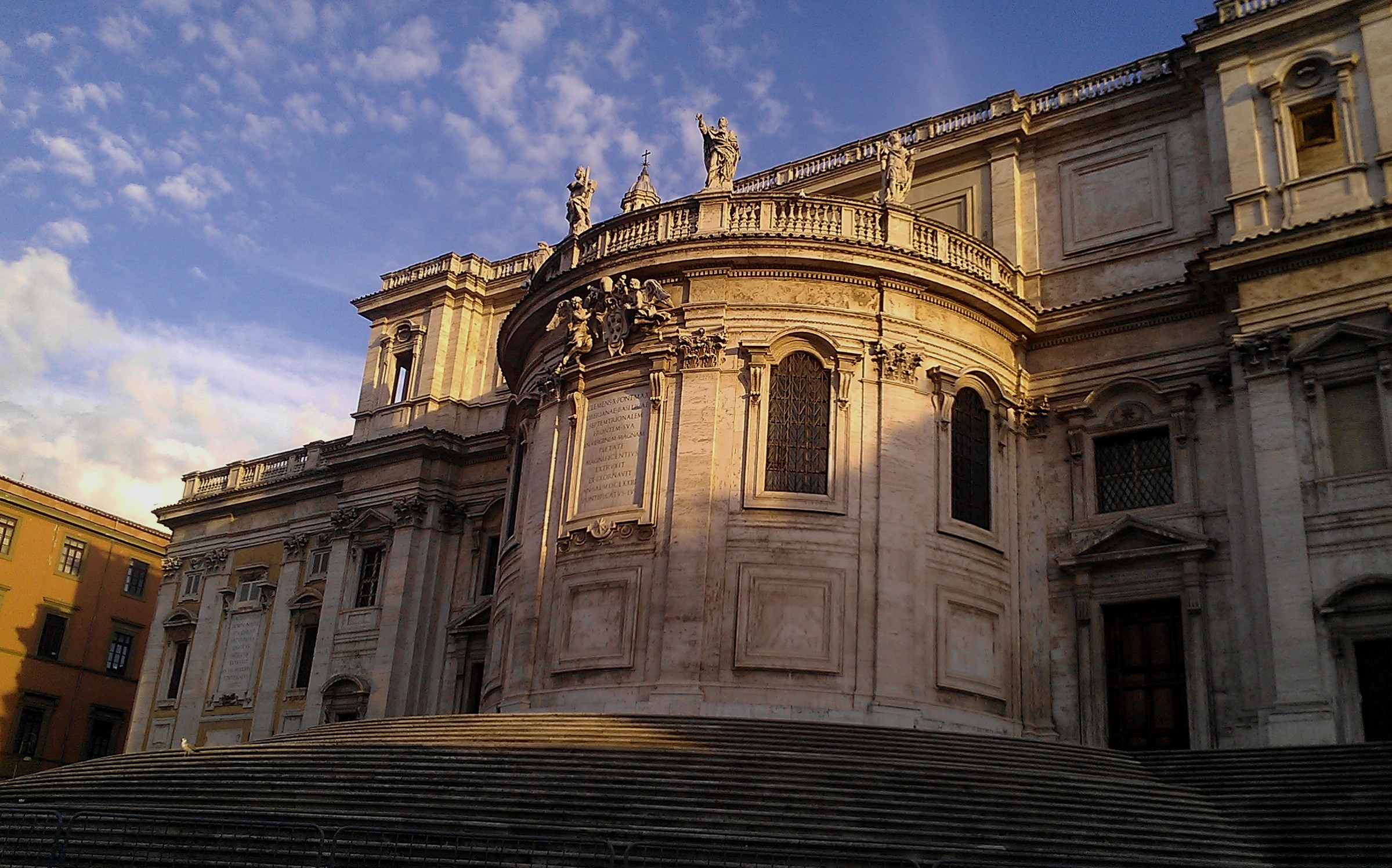
Detail of the external façade of the apse on the north-west of the church on Piazza dell'Esquilino

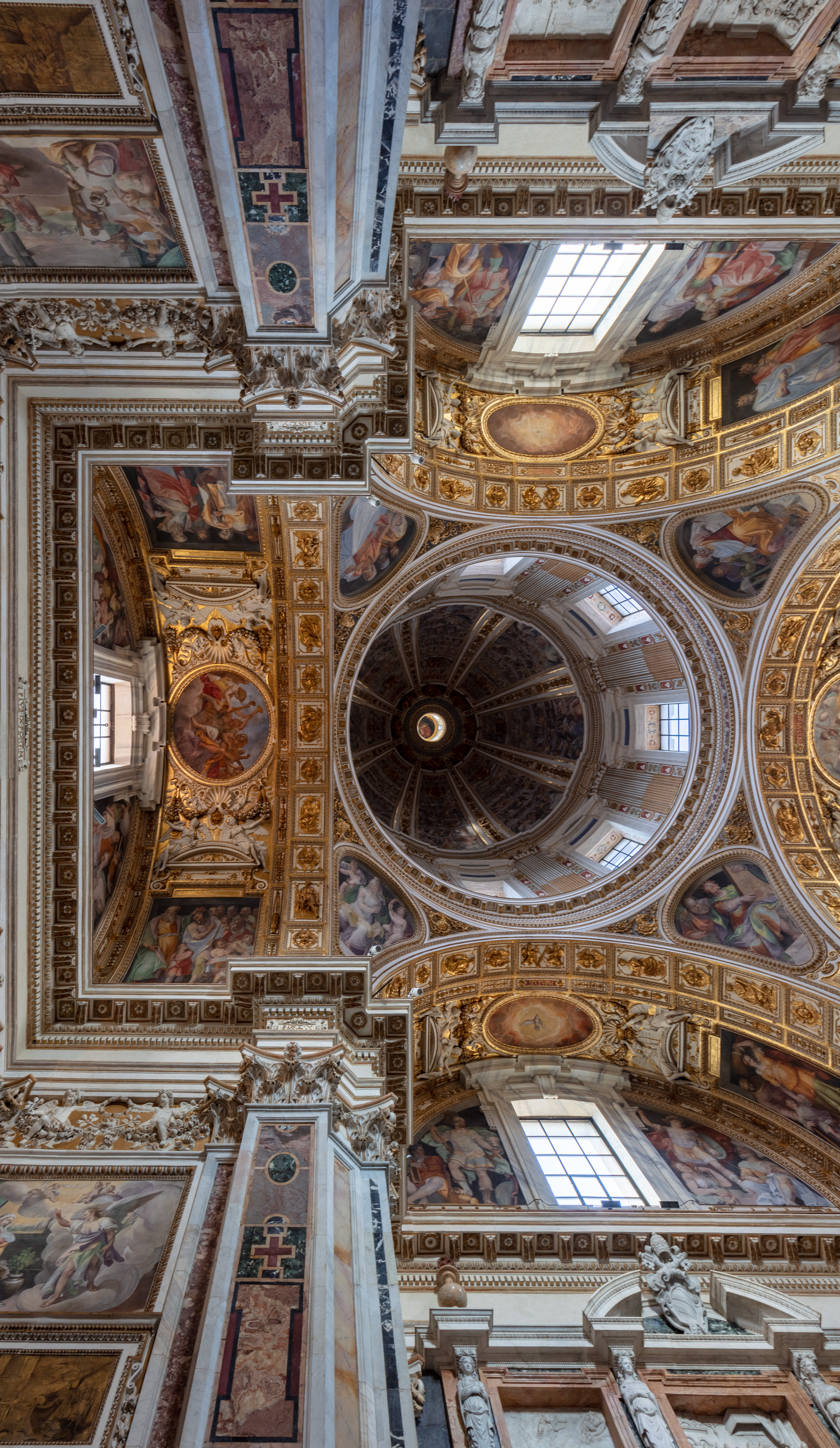
An interior view of the dome

The Athenian marble columns supporting the nave are even older, and either come from the first basilica, or from another antique Roman building. Thirty-six are marble and four granite, pared down, or shortened to make them identical by Ferdinando Fuga, who provided them with identical gilt-bronze capitals.

The 14th-century campanile, or bell tower, is the highest in Rome, at 246 feet, (about 75 m.). The basilica's 16th-century coffered ceiling, to a design by Giuliano da Sangallo, is said to be gilded with gold, initially brought by Christopher Columbus, presented by Ferdinand and Isabella to the Spanish pope, Alexander VI. The apse mosaic, the Coronation of the Virgin, is from 1295, signed by the Franciscan friar, Jacopo Torriti. The Basilica also contains frescoes by Giovanni Baglione, in the Cappella Borghese.

The 12th-century façade has been masked by a reconstruction, with a screening loggia, that was added by Pope Benedict XIV in 1743, to designs by Ferdinando Fuga that did not damage the mosaics of the façade. The wing of the canonica (sacristy) to its left and a matching wing to the right (designed by Flaminio Ponzio) give the basilica's front the aspect of a palace facing the Piazza Santa Maria Maggiore. To the right of the Basilica's façade is a memorial constituting a column in the form of an up-ended cannon barrel topped with a cross: it was erected by Pope Clement VIII to celebrate the end of the French Wars of Religion.

In the piazza in front of the facade rises a column with a Corinthian capital, topped with a statue of the Virgin and the child Jesus. This Marian column was erected in 1614 to the designs of Carlo Maderno during the papacy of Paul V. Maderno's fountain at the base combines the armorial eagles and dragons of Paul V (Borghese). The column itself was the sole intact remainder from the Basilica of Maxentius and Constantine in the Roman Forum. (Note: Prior authors refer to its derivation from the Tempio della Pace or Temple of Peace, which was the name attributed to the Basilica of Maxentius and Constantine before the 18th-century.) The statue on top of the column was made by the sculptor Guillaume Berthélot and cast by Orazio Censore. In a papal bull from the year of its installation, the pope decreed three years of indulgences to those who uttered a prayer to the Virgin while saluting the column.

== Interior ==
=== Fifth-century mosaics ===
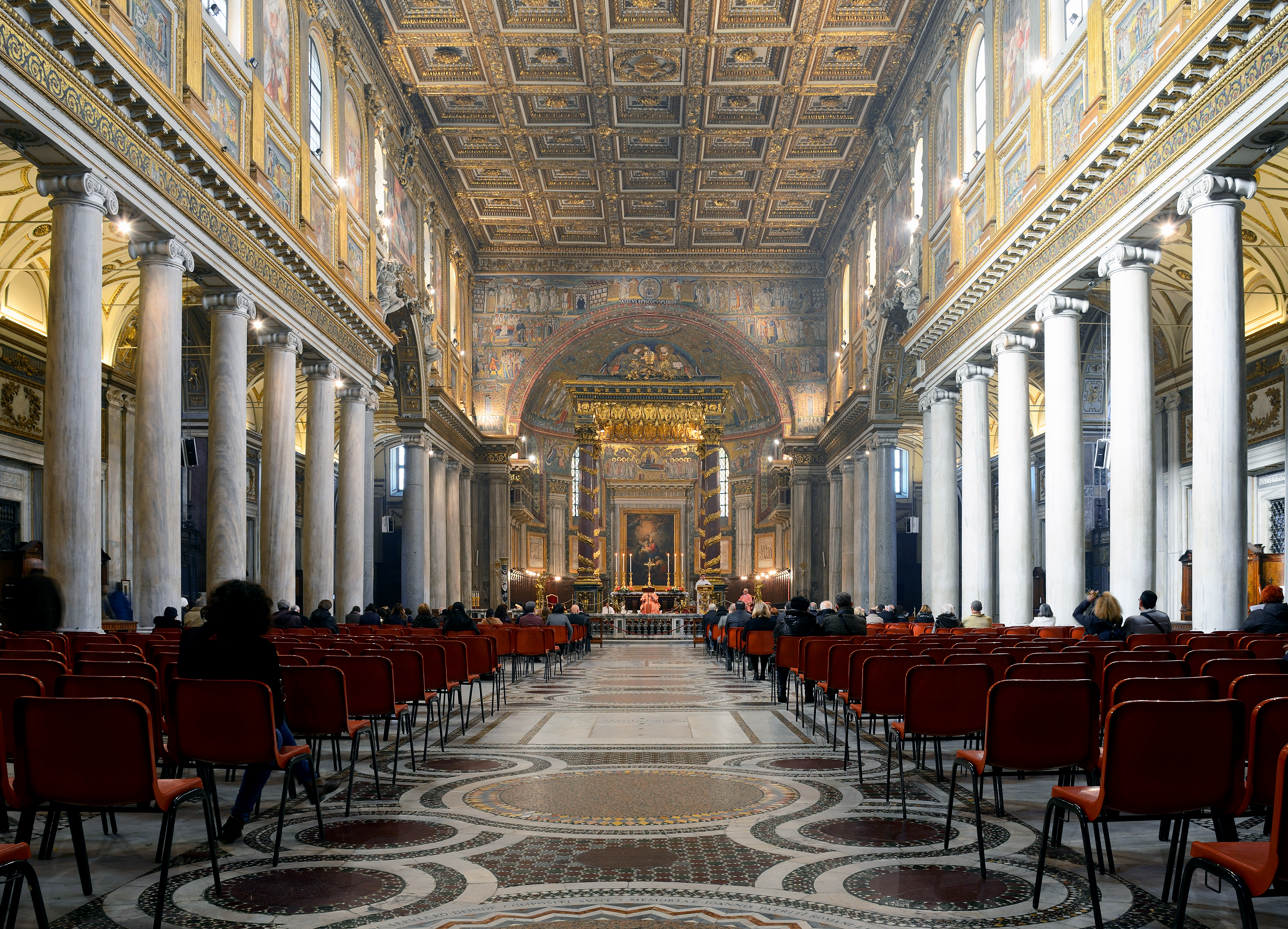
The interior of the basilica. The view down the nave towards the high altar

The mosaics found in Santa Maria Maggiore are one of the oldest representations of the Virgin Mary in Christian late antiquity. As one scholar puts it, "This is well demonstrated by the decoration of Santa Maria Maggiore in Rome,... where the iconographic depiction of the Virgin Mary was chosen at least in part to celebrate the affirmation of Mary as Theotokos (bearer of God) by the third ecumenical Council of Ephesus in 431 CE."

The mosaics of the triumphal arch and the nave in Santa Maria Maggiore gave a model for the future representations of the Virgin Mary. The influences of these mosaics are rooted in late antique impressionism that could be seen in frescoes, manuscript paintings and many pavement mosaics across villas in Africa, Syria and Sicily during the 5th century. This being said, the crowning of Mary on the Apse was made much later by Torriti by commission of Pope Nicholas IV. (13th century).

These mosaics gave historians insight into artistic, religious, and social movements during this time. As Margaret R. Miles explains the mosaics in Santa Maria Maggiore have two goals: one to glorify the Virgin Mary as Theotokos (God-Bearer); and the other to present "a systematic and comprehensive articulation of the relationship of the Hebrew Bible and the Christian scriptures as one in which the Hebrew Bible foreshadows Christianity." This is explained by the dual images of Old Testament and New Testament events depicted in the mosaics of the triumphal arch and the nave.

The mosaics also show the range of artistic expertise and refute the theory that mosaic technique during the time was based on copying from model books. The mosaics found in Santa Maria Maggiore are combinations of different styles of mosaic art during the time, according to art scholar Robin Cormack: "the range of artistic expertise and the actual complexities of production can hardly be reduced to a mentality of copying. A test case is given by the mosaics of S. Maria Maggiore in Rome".

=== Triumphal arch ===
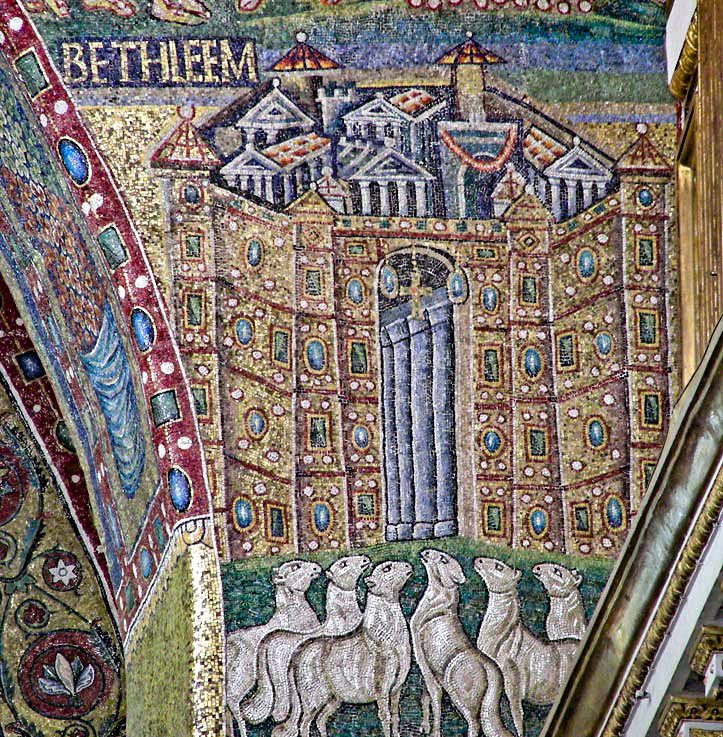
Detail of the mosaic in the triumphal arch, showing Bethlehem

The triumphal arch at the head of the nave was at first referred to as the apse arch, but later became known as the triumphal arch. The triumphal arch is illustrated with magnificent mosaics depicting different scenes of Christ and the Virgin Mary. There was a difference in the styles used in the triumphal arch mosaics compared to those of the nave. The style of the triumphal arch was much more linear and flat as one scholar describes it, not nearly as much action, emotion and movement in them as there were in the Old Testament mosaics of the nave.

One of the first scenes that were visible on the triumphal arch was a panel of Christ's enthronement with a group of angels as his court. As one historian describes it: "On the apse arch Christ is enthroned, a young emperor attended by four chamberlains, angels of course". This is a perfect example of mosaic art in the 5th century. Another panel found on the triumphal arch is of the Virgin. She is crowned and dressed in a colorful veil. Her wardrobe subtly brings to mind that of a Roman empress. She has her divine son walking with her and a suite of angels and Joseph ready to greet her. "The Virgin...shows to perfection the impressionistic character of mosaics."

Another panel is known as the Adoration of the Magi. This mosaic depicts Infant Christ and The Virgin and the arrival of the three wise men, "mosaics illustrating Christ's first coming and his youth covered the triumphal arch." The other panel depicts the Virgin accompanied by five martyrs.

=== Nave ===
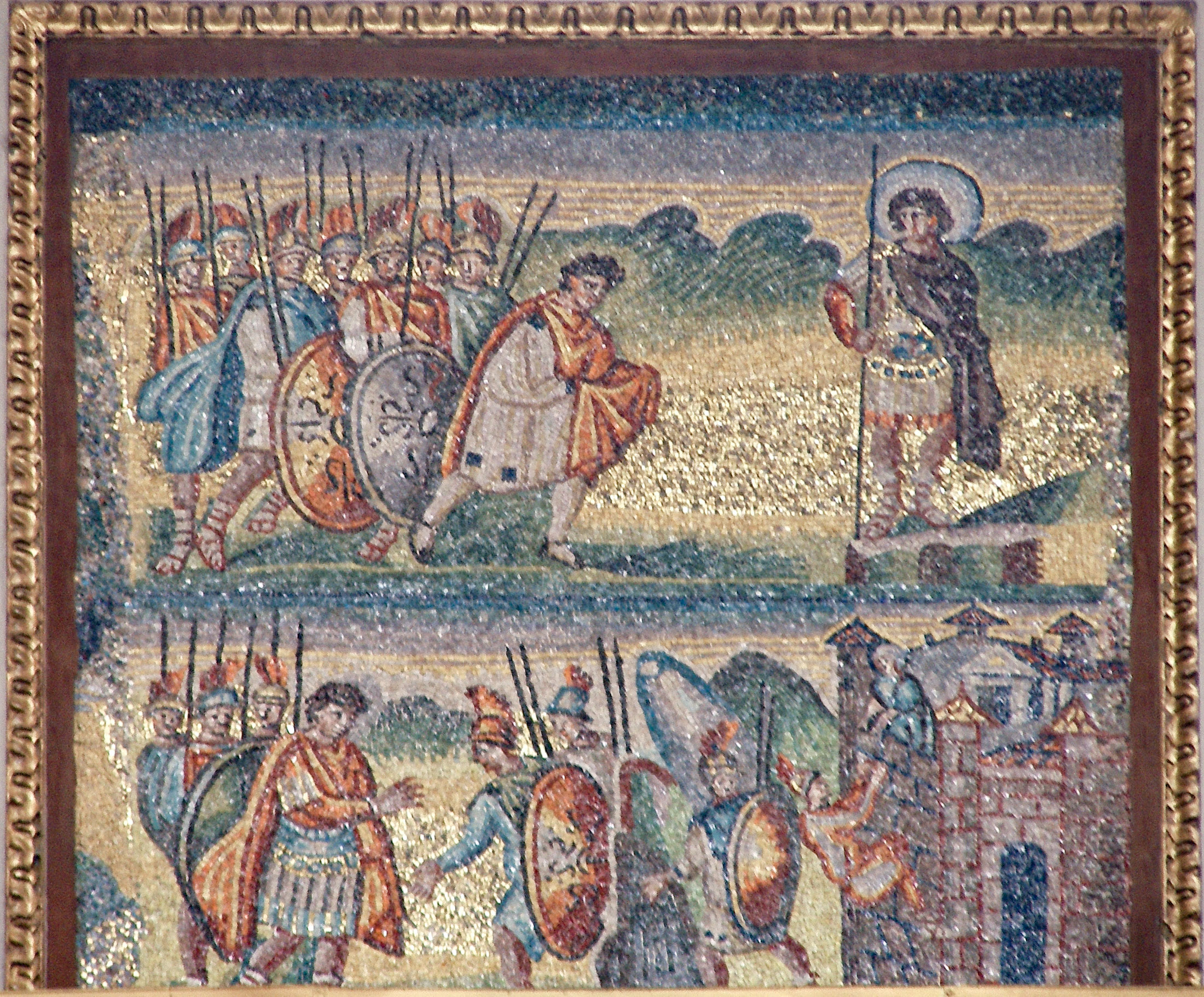
A nave mosaic from the story of Moses

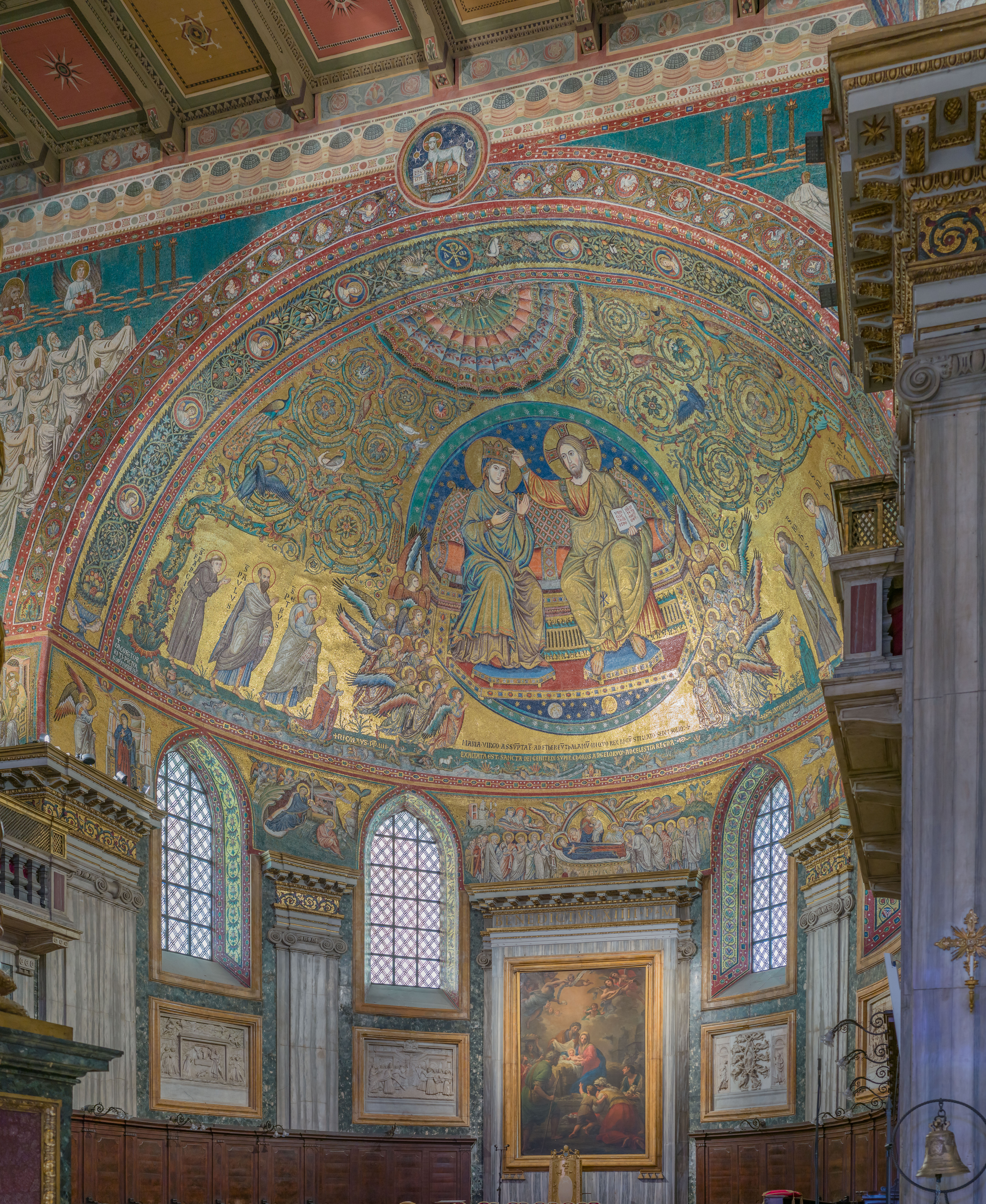
The apse of the basilica

The nave of the basilica was covered in mosaics representing Old Testament events of Moses leading the Jews out of Egypt across the Red Sea. "The nave mosaics (which represents stories of Old Testament history and accordingly offered Christians in Rome a new 'past') are illusionistic in a colorful and impressionist manner" as this scholar puts it the scene was filled with movement, emotion, and it was to inspire thinking of Rome's "new" past; the past of the Old Testament.

As one scholar describes it: "Moses strikes the waters of the Red Sea in a heroic gesture, his toga in light and dark grays and blues, but lined in black, the folds white lines, the tunic underneath light blue; the man next to him wears a deep blue toga over a gray and white tunic."

Another panel shows the demise of the Egyptians in the Red Sea. An observer describes the mosaic: "The Egyptians, clad in blue armor with gold bands and scarlet cloaks wildly flying, drown in the greenish-blue waters; the horses, white or light brown shaded with darker browns, highlighted in white, the accoutrements a bright red."

=== Cappella Sistina and Crypt of the Nativity ===
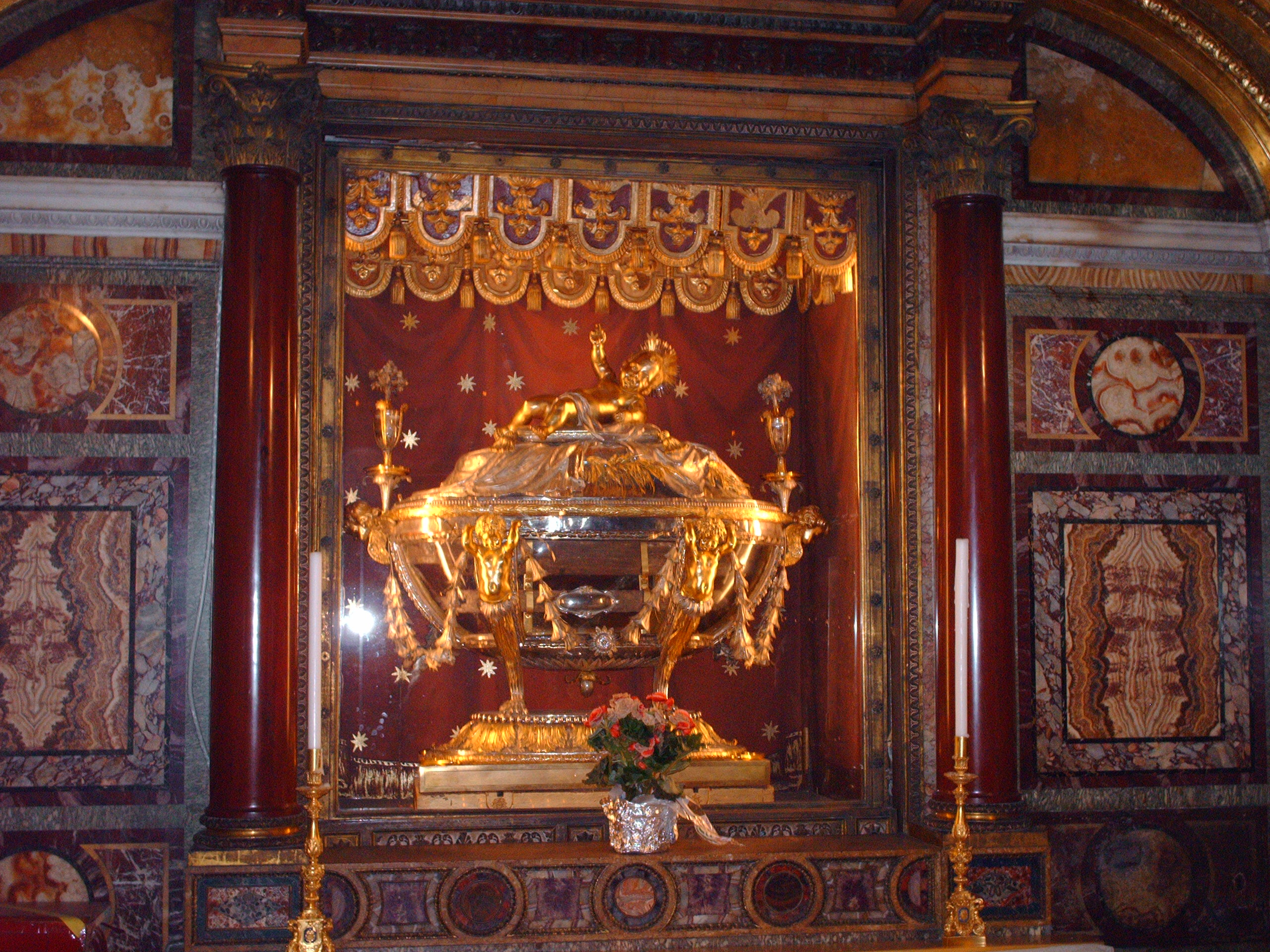
Reliquary of the Holy Crib

Under the high altar of the basilica is the Crypt of the Nativity or Bethlehem Crypt, with a crystal reliquary designed by Giuseppe Valadier said to contain wood from the Holy Crib of the nativity of Jesus Christ. Here is the burial place of Jerome, the 4th-century Doctor of the Church who translated the Bible into the Latin language (the Vulgate).

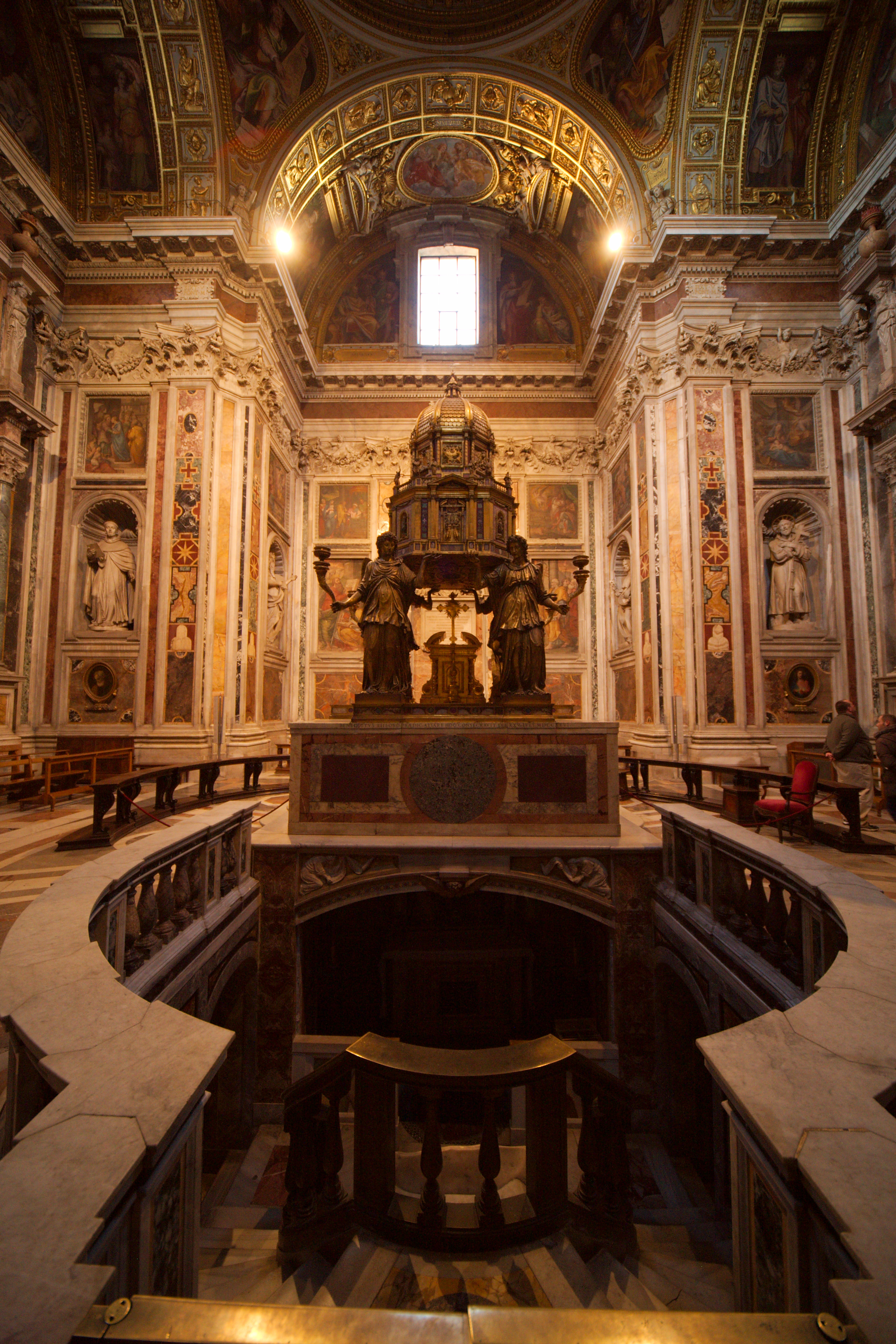
Altar of Sistine Chapel and Oratory of the Nativity

Fragments of the sculpture of the Nativity believed to be by 13th-century Arnolfo di Cambio were transferred to beneath the altar of the large Sistine Chapel off the right transept of the church. This chapel of the Blessed Sacrament is named after Pope Sixtus V, and is not to be confused with the Sistine Chapel of the Vatican, named after Pope Sixtus IV. The architect Domenico Fontana designed the chapel, which contains the tombs of Sixtus V himself and of his early patron Pope Pius V. The main altar in the chapel has four gilded bronze angels by Sebastiano Torregiani, holding up the ciborium, which is a model of the chapel itself.

Beneath this altar is the Oratory or Chapel of the Nativity, on whose altar, at that time situated in the Crypt of the Nativity below the main altar of the church itself, Ignatius of Loyola celebrated his first Mass as a priest on 25 December 1538.

Just outside the Sistine Chapel is the tomb of Gian Lorenzo Bernini and his family.

The Mannerist interior decoration of the Sistine Chapel was completed (1587–1589) by a large team of artists, directed by Cesare Nebbia and Giovanni Guerra. While the art biographer, Giovanni Baglione allocates specific works to individual artists, recent scholarship finds that the hand of Nebbia drew preliminary sketches for many, if not all, of the frescoes. Baglione also concedes the roles of Nebbia and Guerra could be summarized as "Nebbia drew, and Guerra supervised the teams".

Painter	Work
Giovanni Battista Pozzo	Angelic Glory, Visitation, Annunciation, Joseph's dream, St. Paul & John Evangelist, St. Peter enters Rome,& Massacre of infants
Lattanzio Mainardi	Tamar, Fares, Zara, Solomon, & Boaz
Hendrick van den Broeck (Arrigo Fiammingo)	Esrom, Aram, Aminabad & Naassom
Paris Nogari	Ruth, Jesse, David, Solomon & Roboam; & the Holy Family
Giacomo Stella	Jehoshaphat & Jehoram, Jacob, Judah & his brothers, Sacrifice of Isacc
Angiolo Nebbia	Ozias & Jonathan, Abiud and Eliacim, Manassah and Amon, Josiah and Jechonia, Salatiele & Zorobabel
Salvatore Fontana	Jacob, Eli, Eliezer and Nathan, Herod orders massacre of the innocents, Annunciation
Cesare Nebbia	Chaziel & Ezekias, Sadoch, Achim, Amoz
Ercole from Bologna	Flight from Egypt and Mary visits Elisabeth's house
Andrea Lilio	Magi before Herod

Others include Ferdinando Sermei, Giacomo Stella, Paul Bril, and Ferraù Fenzoni.

=== Cappella Paolina (or Borghese Chapel) and Salus Populi Romani ===
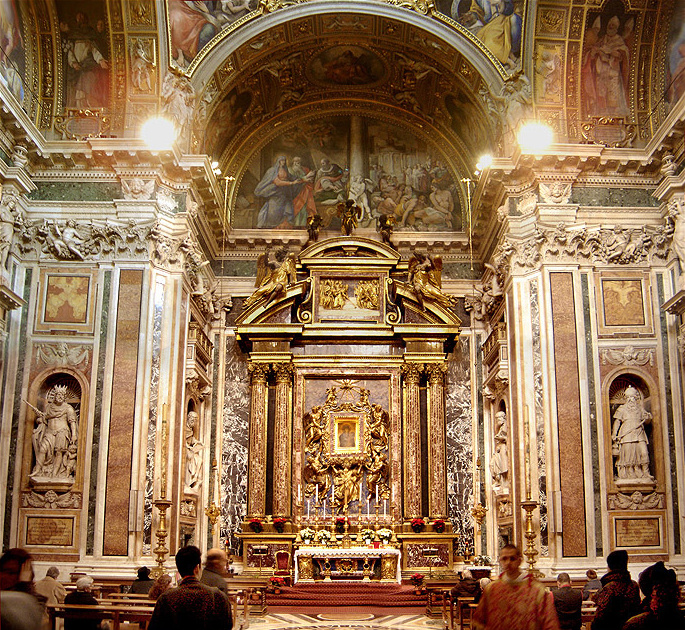
The Borghese Chapel

The column in the Piazza Santa Maria Maggiore celebrates the famous icon of the Virgin Mary now enshrined in the Borghese Chapel of the basilica. It is known as Salus Populi Romani ("Protectress of the Roman People" or "Health of the Roman People") due to a miracle in which the icon reportedly helped keep plague from the city. The icon is at least a thousand years old, and according to a tradition was painted from life by St Luke the Evangelist using the wooden table of the Holy Family in Nazareth.

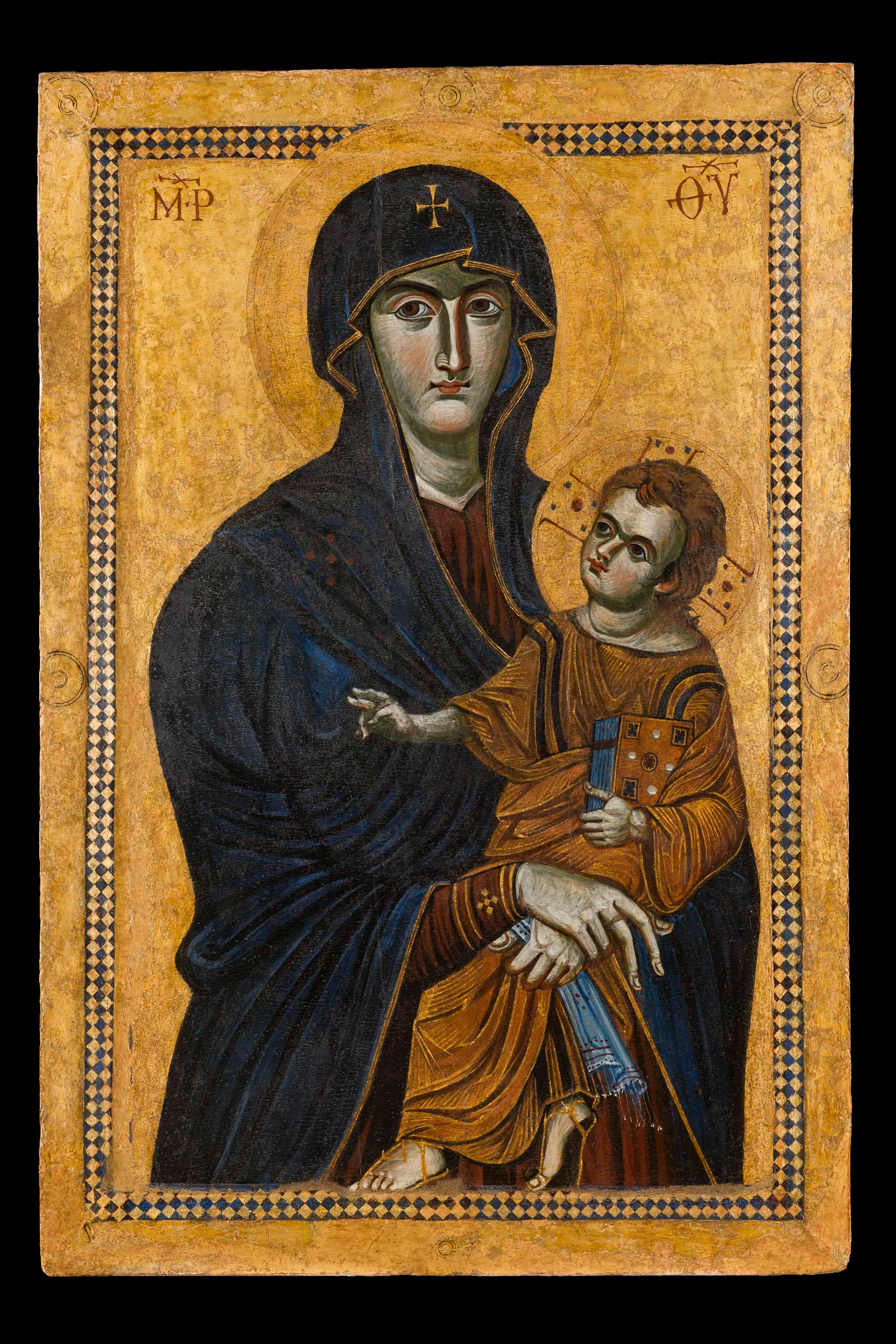
Salus Populi Romani, perhaps the oldest Marian image in Rome

The Salus Populi Romani has been praised by several popes and acted as a key Mariological symbol.

Prior to becoming Pope Pius XII, Cardinal Eugenio Pacelli celebrated his first Catholic Mass before the image inside the Borghese Chapel on Easter Sunday, 2 April 1899. In December 1953, the icon was carried through Rome to initiate the first Marian year. On 1 November 1954, the icon was translated and officially crowned by Pope Pius XII at Basilica of Saint Peter as he gave a personal speech and introduced a new Marian feast Queenship of Mary.

Future pontiffs Pope Paul VI, Pope John Paul II, Pope Benedict XVI, and Pope Francis all visited the Salus Populi Romani and led liturgical celebrations.

== Papal basilica ==
As a papal basilica, Santa Maria Maggiore is often used by the pope. He presides over the rites for the annual Feast of the Assumption of Mary on 15 August there. Except for a few priests and the basilica's archpriest, the canopied high altar is reserved for use by the pope alone. Pope Francis visited the basilica on the day after his election.

The pope gives charge of the basilica to an archpriest, usually a cardinal. Formerly, the archpriest was the titular Latin Patriarch of Antioch, a title abolished in 1964. Since 4 July 2025, the archpriest has been Rolandas Makrickas.

In addition to the archpriest and his assistant priests, a chapter of canons is resident. Redemptorist, Dominican and Franciscan Friars of the Immaculate priests serve the church.

The King of Spain, currently Felipe VI, is ex officio protocanon of the basilica's chapter.

As pope, Francis visited the basilica often, mainly to visit the Salus Populi Romani. He visited before and after trips outside the Vatican, calling the icon his "great devotion." He had also constructed a tomb next to the icon to be his final resting place upon his death in 2025. Francis was laid to rest at Santa Maria Maggiore on the afternoon of Saturday, 26 April 2025, following a funeral procession from Vatican City. Francis thereby became the first pope to be interred outside the Vatican since Leo XIII in 1903, and the first pope interred in Santa Maria Maggiore since Clement IX in 1669.

== Archpriests of the Basilica di Santa Maria Maggiore since 1127 ==
List of archpriests since 1127. (Note: Note that, initially, not all archpriests of the basilica were cardinals.)

- Rainiero (attested 1127–1130)
- Matteo (attested 1153)
- Paolo Scolari (attested 1176–1187)
- Rolando (attested 1189–1193)
- Pietro Sasso (attested 1212) (Note: Archpriest Pietro Sasso is commonly identified with contemporary cardinal Pietro Sasso of S. Pudenziana (1206–1218/19). However, this identification remains uncertain because the only document which mentions this archpriest (dated 3 July 1212) makes no reference to his cardinalate, cf. Ferri in ASRSP, vol. 28, p. 24.)
- Romano (attested 1222)
- Astor (attested 1244)
- Pietro Capocci (?) (named in 1245?) (Note: Cardinal Pietro Capocci (died 1259) is mentioned in the majority of the catalogs of archpriests of Liberian Basilica but the documents from the archive of the Basilica, published by Ferri in ASRSP, vol. 27, pp. 34–39 and vol. 30, p. 119, give no support for this affirmation. Document dated 19 March 1244 mentions Astor (or Aston) as archpriest, documents between 13 February 1247 and 1 October 1255 mention archpriest without mentioning his name but also without indicating his cardinalate, and on 28 May 1258 Romano was archpriest of the Basilica; the latest document mentions also cardinal Pietro Capocci but makes no reference to his occupation of that post. If he was really an archpriest under Innocent IV, he must have later resigned, but it seems more likely that this statement resulted from a confusion.)
- Romano (attested 1258)
- Ottobono Fieschi (1262–1276)
- Giacomo Colonna (1288–1297)
- Francesco Napoleone Orsini (administrator 1298–1306)
- Giacomo Colonna (again) (1306–1318)
- Pietro Colonna (1318–1326)
- Luca Fieschi (1326?–1336)
- Giovanni Colonna (1336–1348)
- Nicola Capocci (after 1350–1368)
- Pierre Roger de Beaufort (1368–1370)
- Marino Giudice (?–1385)
- Marino Bulcani (1385–1394)
- Stefano Palosio (1394–1396)
- Enrico Minutoli (1396–1412)
- Rinaldo Brancaccio (1412–1427)
- Francesco Lando (1427)
- Jean de la Rochetaillée (1428–1437)
- Antonio Casini (1437–1439)
- Giovanni Vitelleschi (1439–1440)
- Nicola Albergati (1440–1443)
- Guillaume d'Estouteville (1443–1483)
- Rodrigo Borgia (1483–1492)
- Giovanni Battista Savelli (1492–1498)
- Giovanni Battista Orsini (1498–1503)
- Giuliano Cesarini iuniore (1503–1510)
- Pedro Luis Borja Lanzol de Romani (1510–1511)
- Robert Guibe (1511)
- Francisco de Remolins (1511–1518)
- Leonardo Grosso della Rovere (1518–1520)
- Andrea della Valle (1520–1534)
- Paolo Emilio Cesi (1534–1537)
- Alessandro Farnese (1537–1543)
- Guido Ascanio Sforza (1543–1564)
- Carlo Borromeo (1564–1572)
- Alessandro Sforza (1572–1581)
- Filippo Boncompagni (1581–1586)
- Decio Azzolini (seniore) (1586–1587)
- Domenico Pinelli (1587–1611)
- Michelangelo Tonti (1611–1612)
- Giovanni Garzia Millini (1612–1629)
- Francesco Barberini (1629–1633)
- Antonio Barberini (1633–1671)
- Giacomo Rospigliosi (1671–1684)
- Felice Rospigliosi (1684–1688)
- Philip Thomas Howard (1689–1694)
- Benedetto Pamphili (1694–1699)
- Giacomo Antonio Morigia (1699–1701)
- Pietro Ottoboni (1702–1730)
- Lodovico Pico della Mirandola (1730–1743)
- Girolamo Colonna di Sciarra (1743–1763)
- Marcantonio Colonna (iuniore) (1763–1793)
- Andrea Corsini (1793–1795)
- Gian Francesco Albani (1795–1803)
- Antonio Despuig y Dameto (28 December 1803 – 2 May 1813)
- Giovanni Gallarati Scotti (1814 – 6 October 1819)
- Annibale Francesco Della Genga (10 February 1818 – 28 September 1823)
- Benedetto Naro (1 January 1824 – 6 October 1832)
- Carlo Odescalchi (1832 – 21 November 1834)
- Giuseppe Antonio Sala (11 December 1838 – 23 August 1839)
- Luigi del Drago (29 August 1839 – 28 April 1845)
- Costantino Patrizi Naro (24 April 1845 – 21 September 1867)
- Gustav Adolf Hohenlohe (15 July 1878 – 30 October 1896)
- Vincenzo Vannutelli (16 December 1896 – 9 July 1930)
- Bonaventura Cerretti (16 July 1930 – 8 May 1933)
- Angelo Dolci (22 May 1933 – 13 September 1939)
- Alessandro Verde (11 October 1939 – 29 March 1958)
- Carlo Confalonieri (16 November 1959 – 1 August 1986)
- Luigi Dadaglio (15 December 1986 – 22 August 1990)
- Ugo Poletti (17 January 1991 – 25 February 1997)
- Carlo Furno (29 September 1997 – 27 May 2004)
- Bernard Francis Law (27 May 2004 – 21 November 2011)
- Santos Abril y Castelló (21 November 2011 – 28 December 2016)
- Stanisław Ryłko (28 December 2016 – 4 July 2025)
- Rolandas Makrickas (4 July 2025)

== Major works of art in the basilica ==
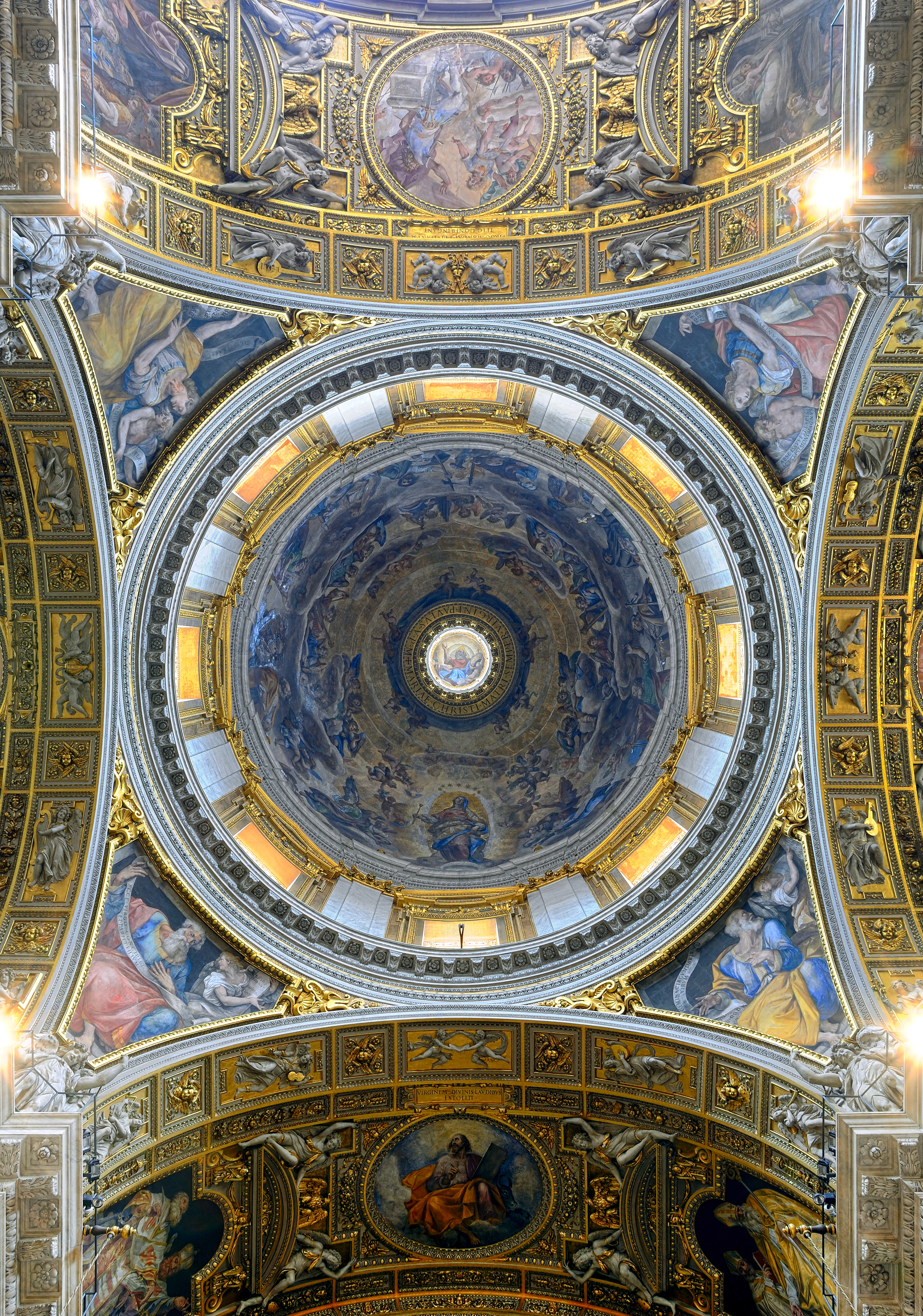
Pauline Chapel dome frescoes, by Guido Reni

- Ancient Roman agricultural calendar
- Early Christian mosaic cycle depicting Old Testament events, 5th century
- The Salus Populi Romani, a much venerated early icon of the Virgin and Child.
- Funerary monument of Clement IX (1671) by Carlo Rainaldi with the papal bust by Domenico Guidi.
- Statue of King Philip IV of Spain by Gian Lorenzo Bernini, 1666.
- Temporary catafalque for Philip IV of Spain designed in 1665 by Rainaldi, no longer exists.
- Funerary monument of Pope Nicholas IV, designed by Domenico Fontana in 1574.
- Bust of Costanzo Patrizi by Algardi.
- Sacristy frescoes by Domenico Passignano and Giuseppe Puglia,
- High altar sculpture by Pietro Bracci, (c. 1750).
- Statue of Pius IX in prayer by Ignazio Jacometti, (c. 1880).
- Pauline Chapel frescoes, by Guido Reni
- Frescoes for the monument of Clement VIII, Lanfranco
- Cesi Chapel tombs by Guglielmo della Porta
- Altar, confessio and Presepio (crib) sculptures by Arnolfo di Cambio, about 1290
- Regina Pacis statue by Guido Galli, 1918

== Burials in the church ==
=== Artists ===
- Gian Lorenzo Bernini
- Girolamo Muziano

=== Nobility ===
- Pauline Bonaparte
- Junio Valerio Borghese

=== Clergy and religious figures ===
- Archbishop Domenico Caloyera
- Cardinal Guido Ascanio Sforza di Santa Fiora
- Cardinal Ugo Poletti
- Cardinal Carlo Furno
- Cardinal Bernard Francis Law
- Saint Jerome, relics

=== Historical figures ===
- Emanuele Ne Vunda

=== Popes ===
- Pope Clement VIII
- Pope Clement IX
- Pope Francis
- Pope Honorius III (no longer extant)
- Pope Nicholas IV
- Pope Paul V
- Pope St. Pius V
- Pope Sixtus V

== Gallery ==
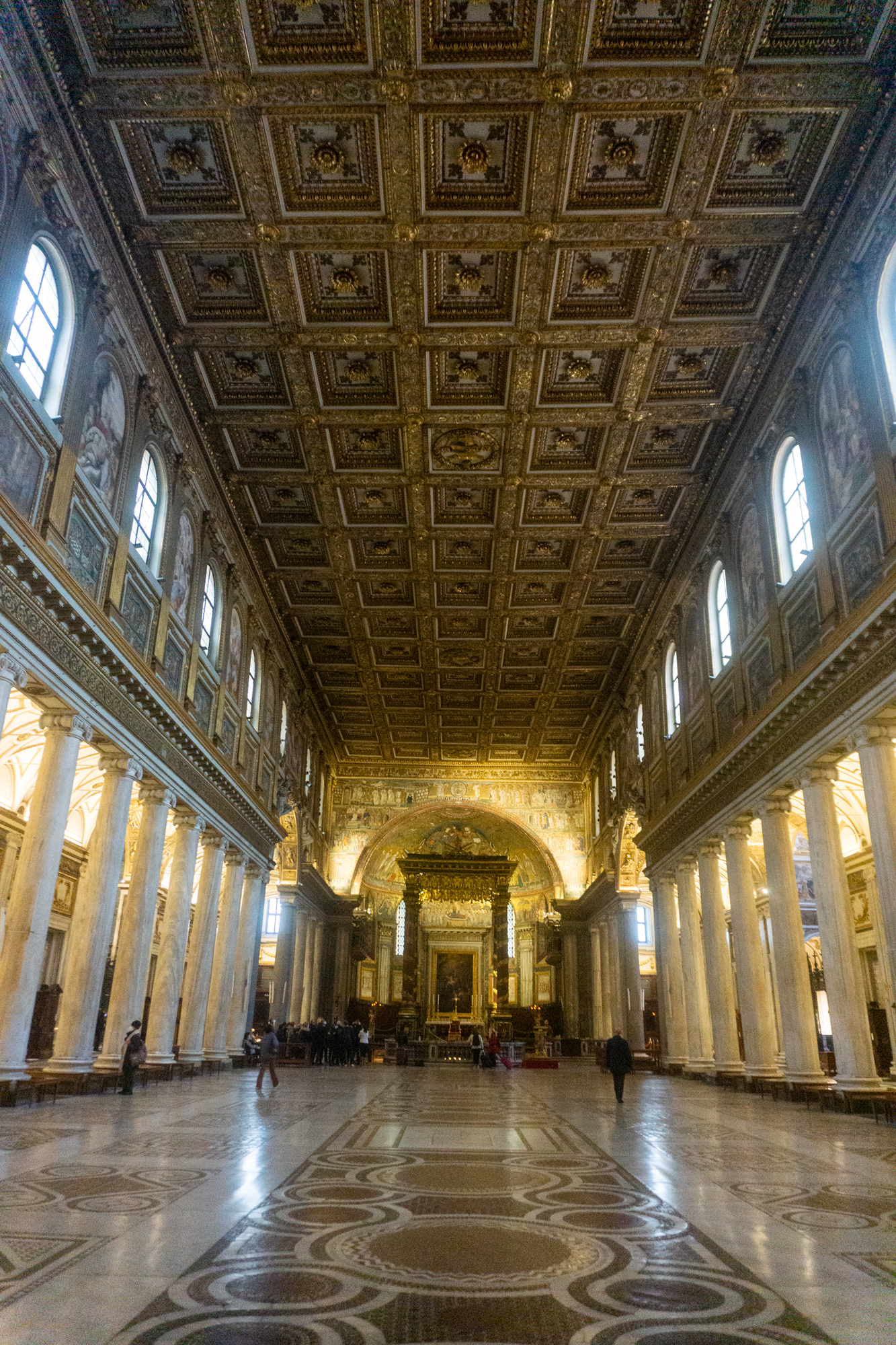

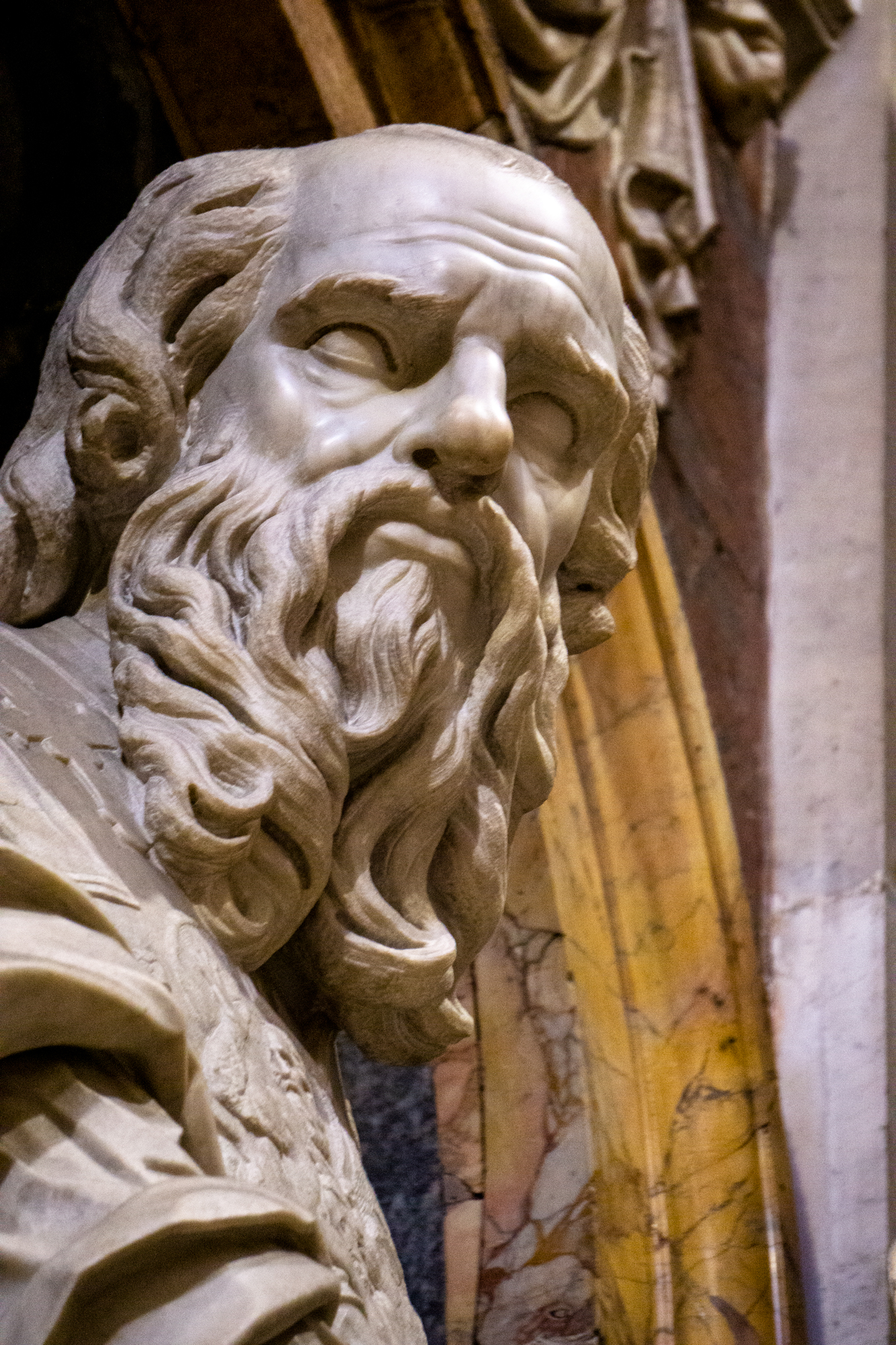

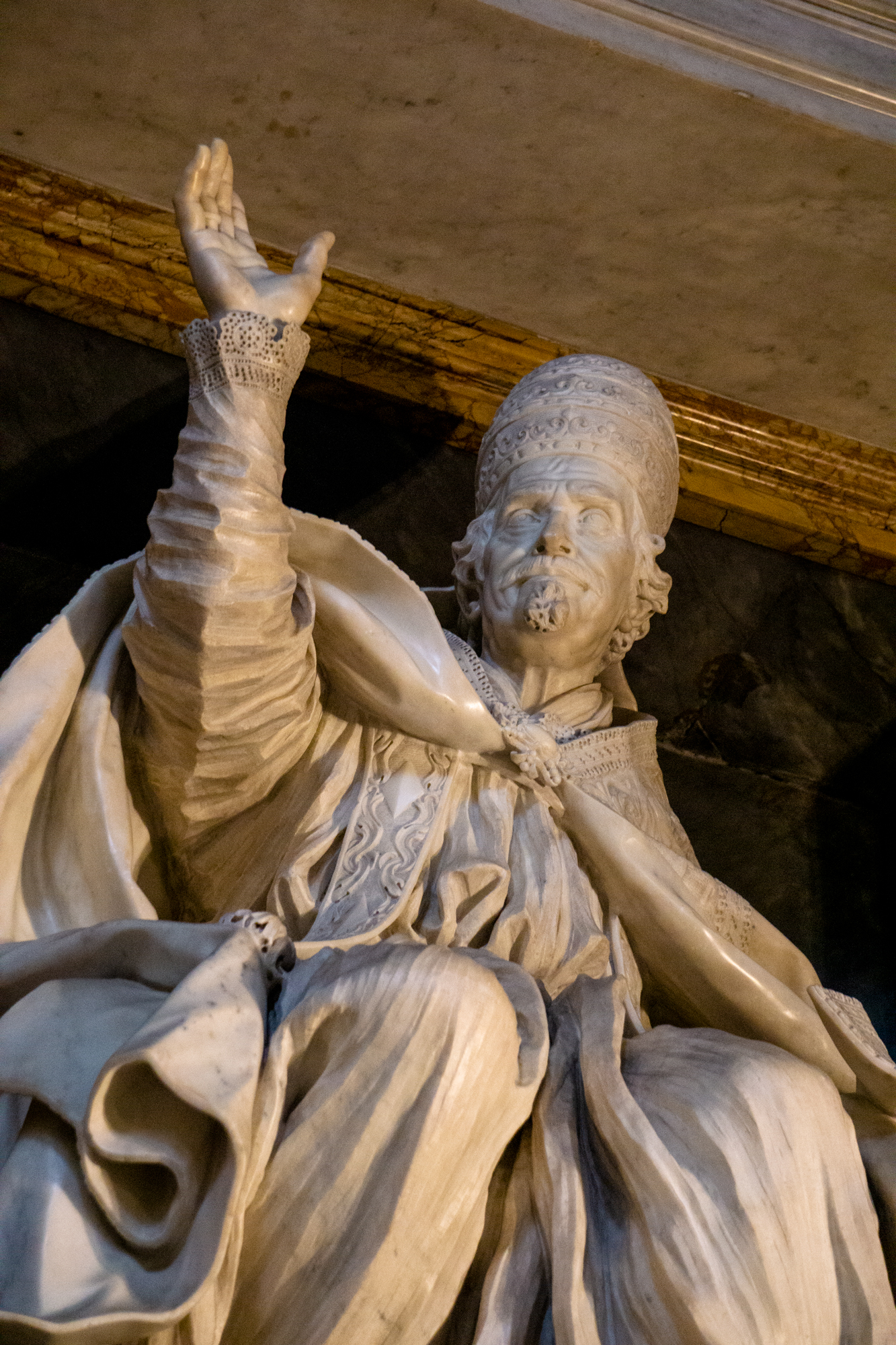

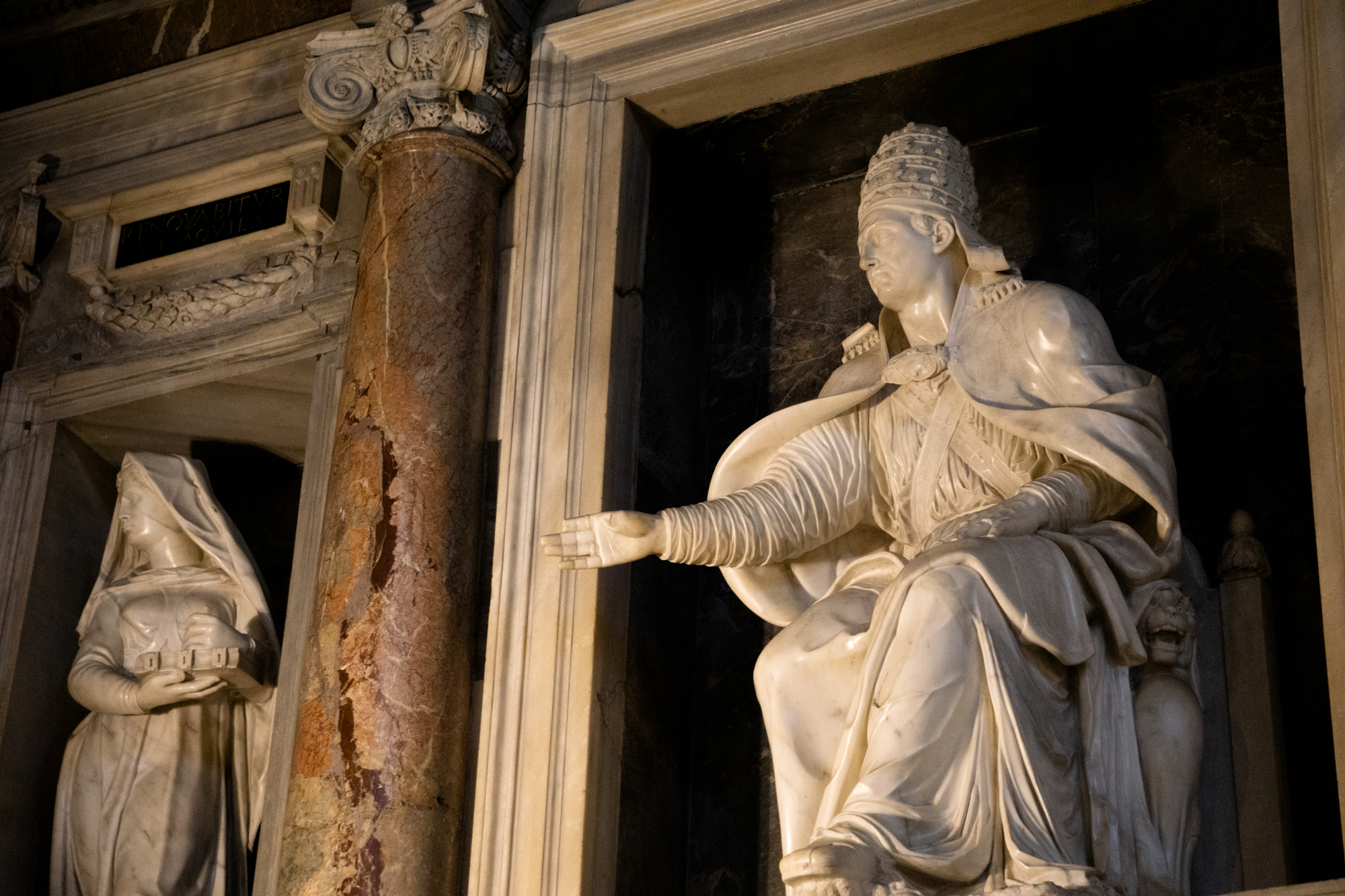

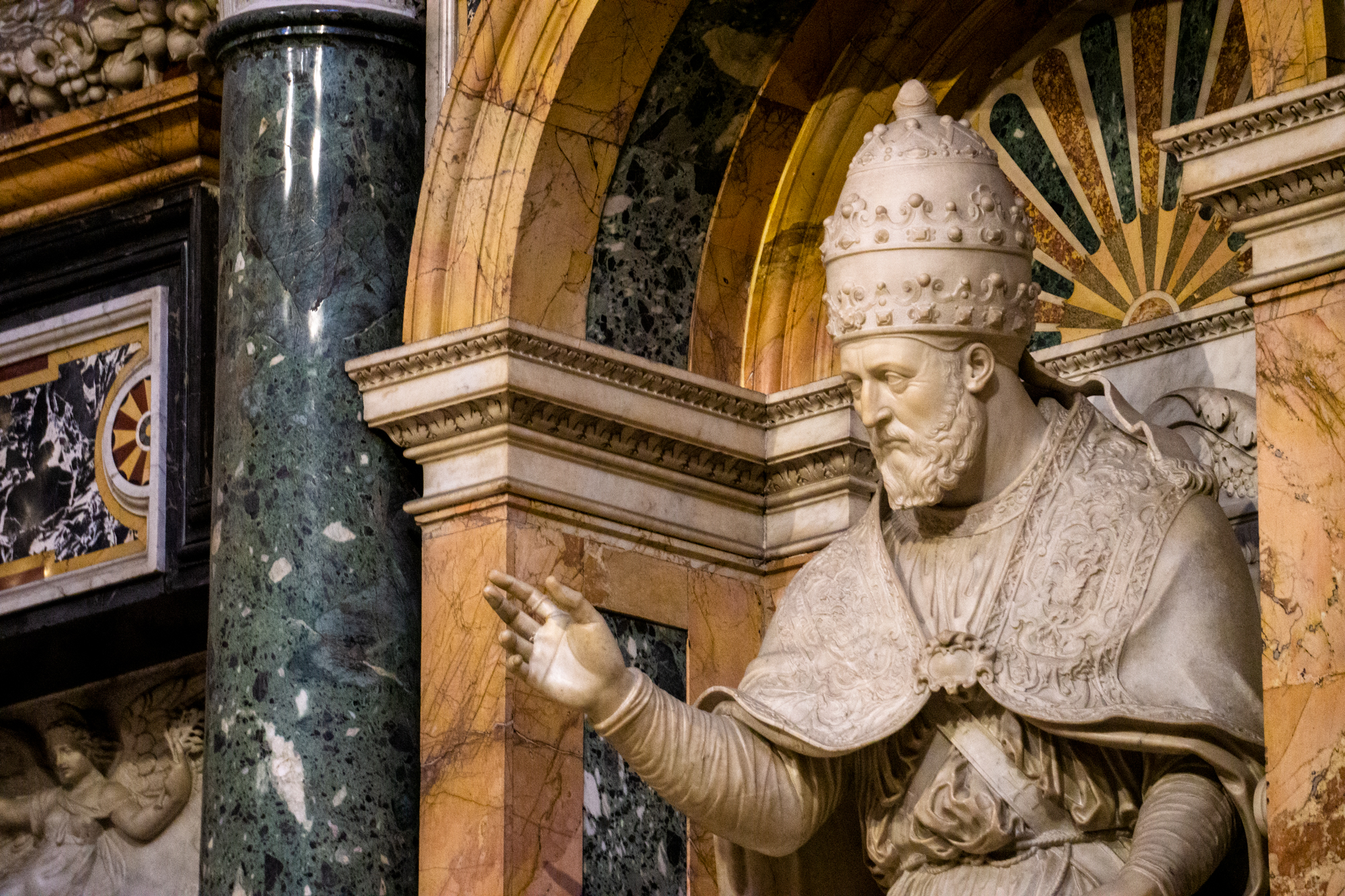
Tomb of Clement VIII

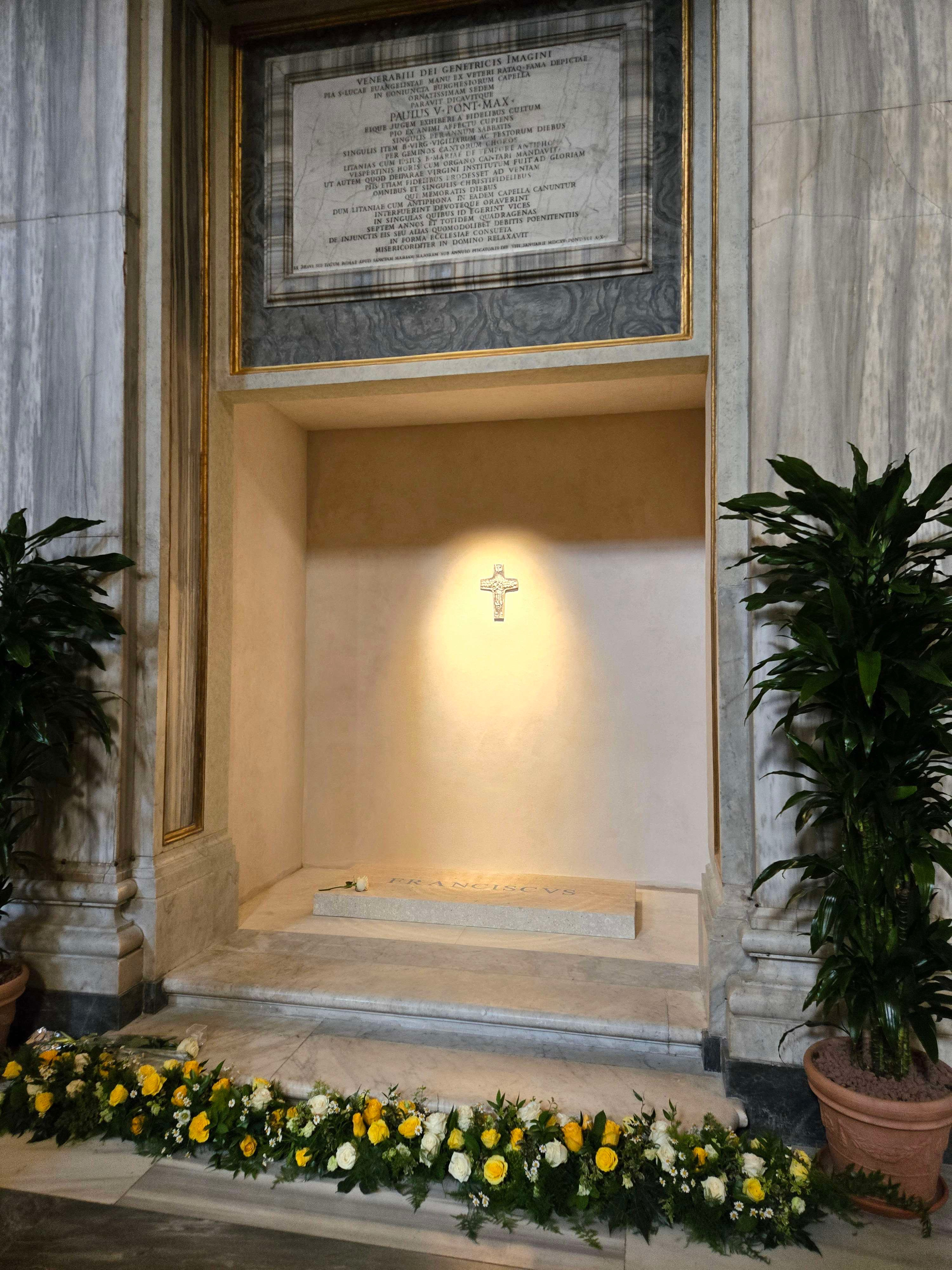
Tomb of Pope Francis

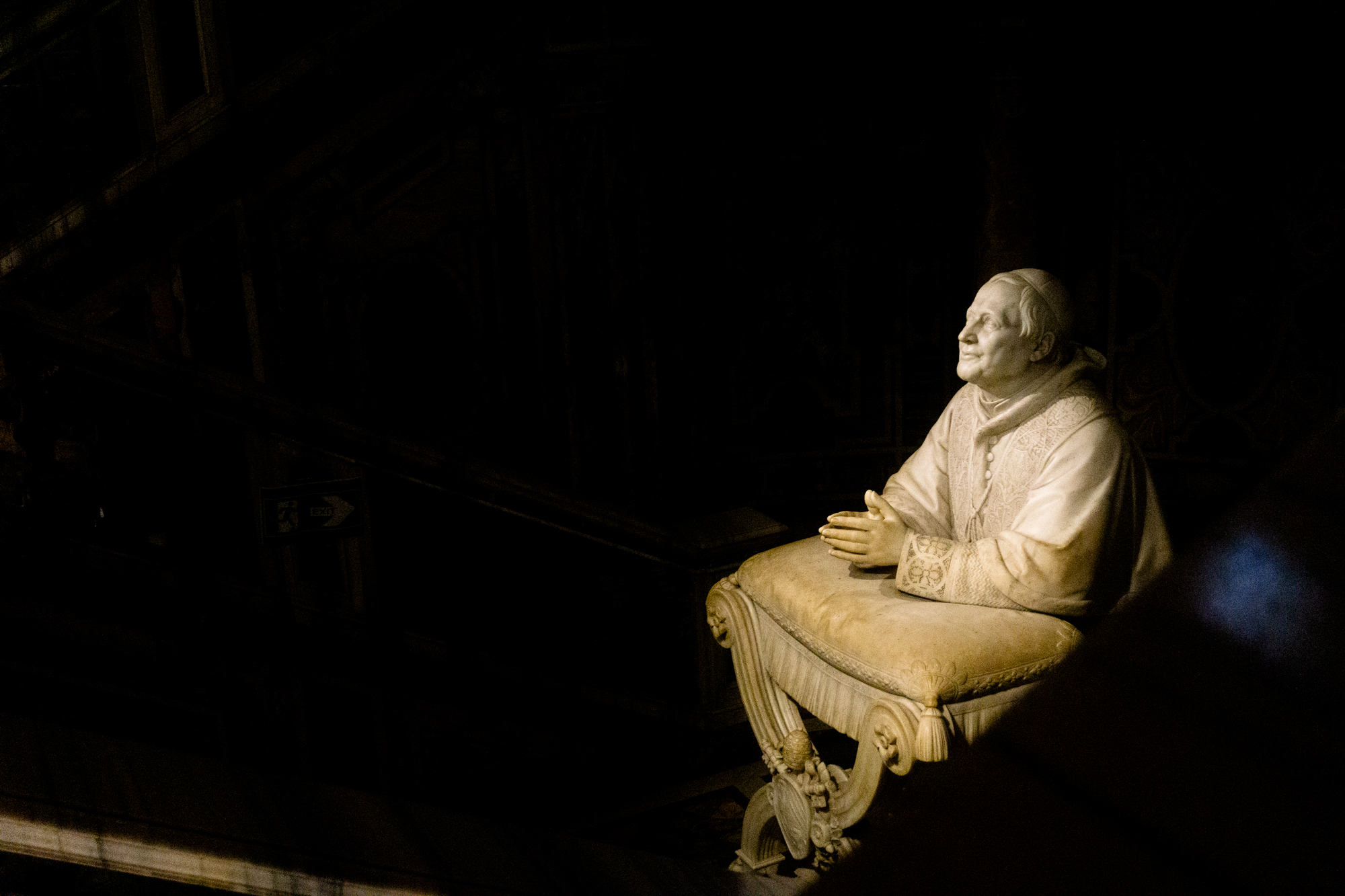
Pope Pius IX - Ignazio Jacometti

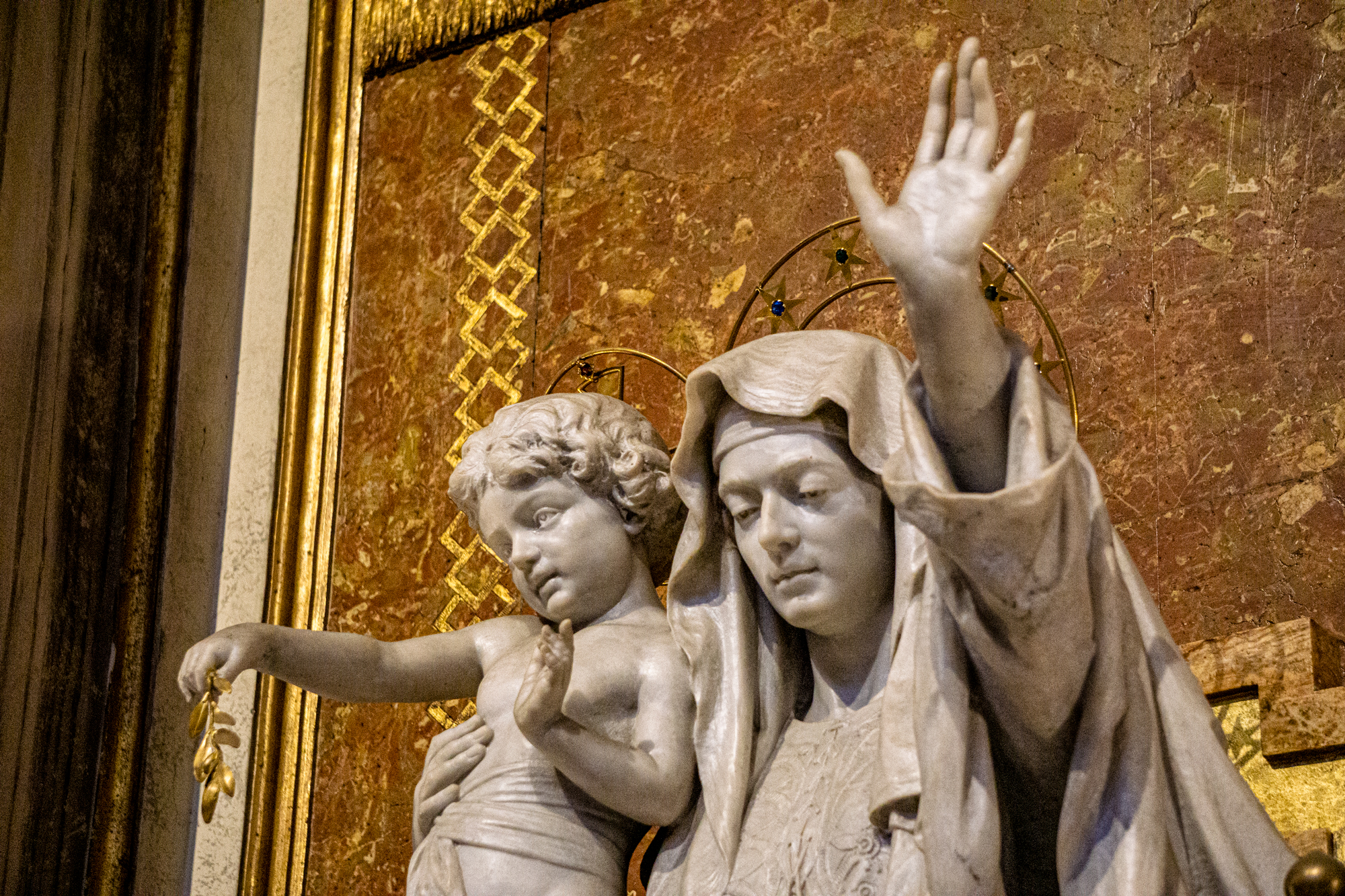
Ave Regina Pacis

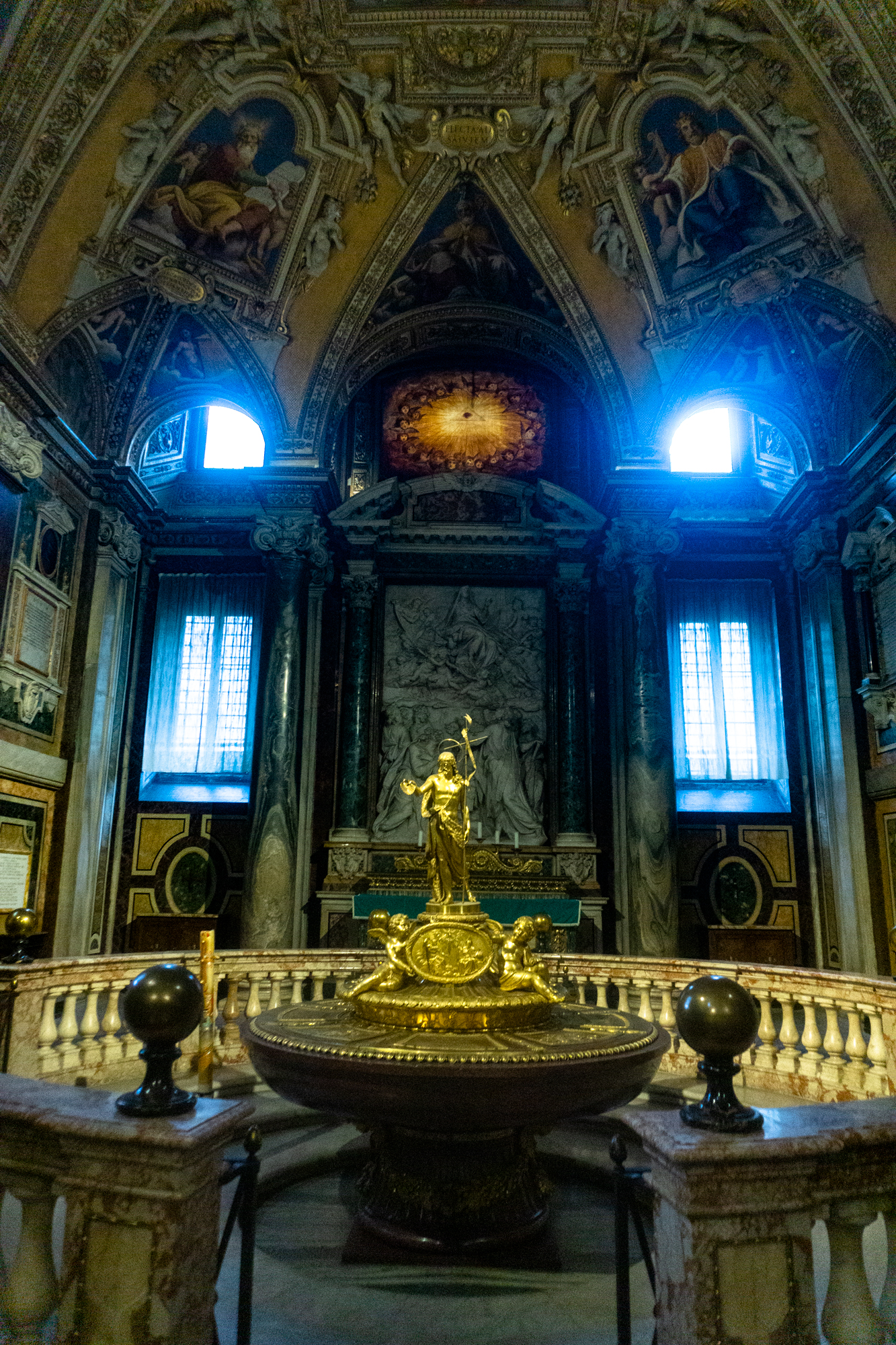
Baptismal chapel

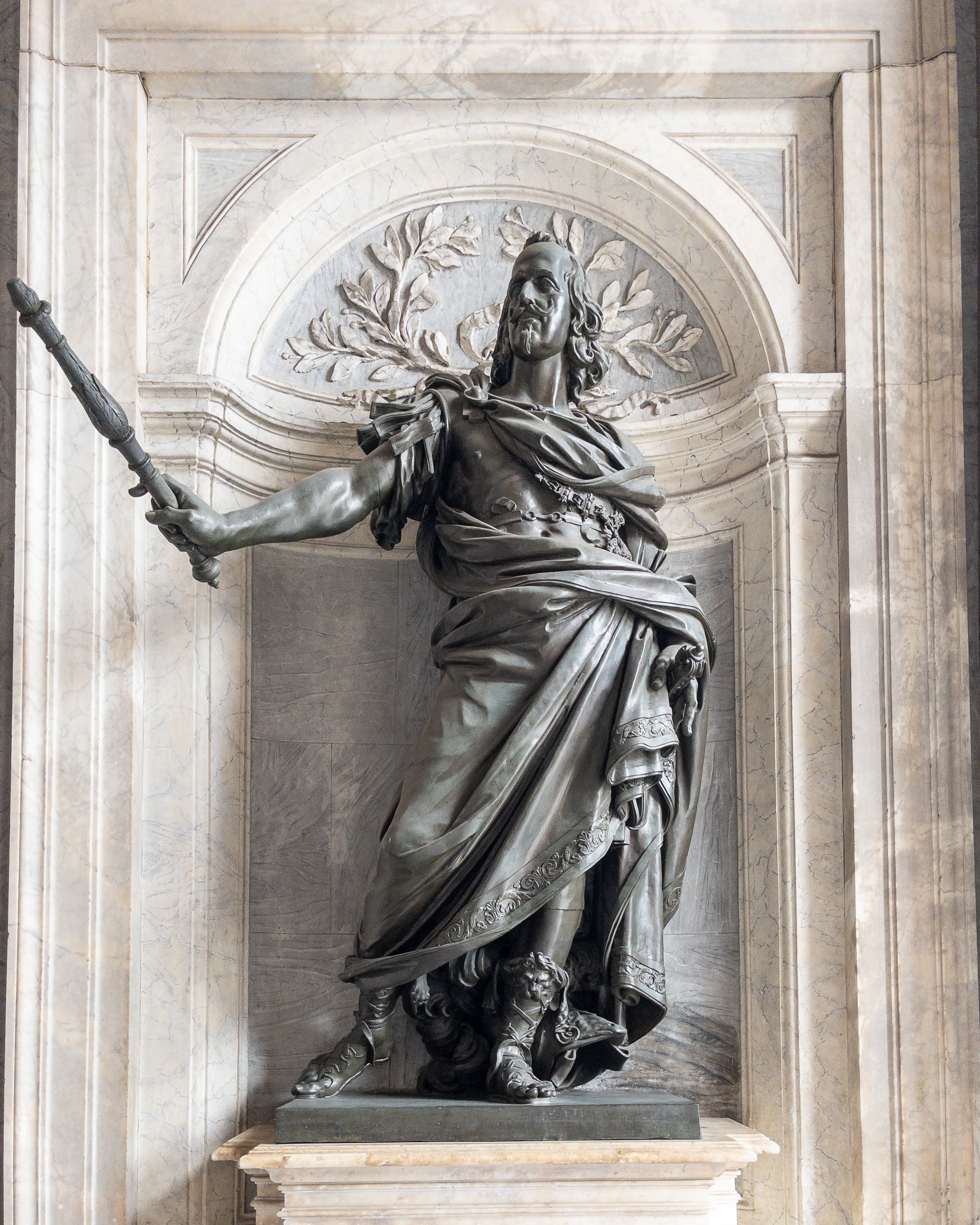
Statue of King Philip IV of Spain

== See also ==
- Properties of the Holy See
- Roman Catholic Marian churches
- Dedication of the Basilica of St Mary Major, feast day
- Index of Vatican City-related articles
- San Ciriaco alle Terme Diocleziane

== Notes ==
Preceded by Archbasilica of Saint John Lateran	Landmarks of Rome; Santa Maria Maggiore	Succeeded by Basilica of Saint Paul Outside the Walls
