= East End Brewing Company =

Coordinates: 40.4594°N 79.9117°W

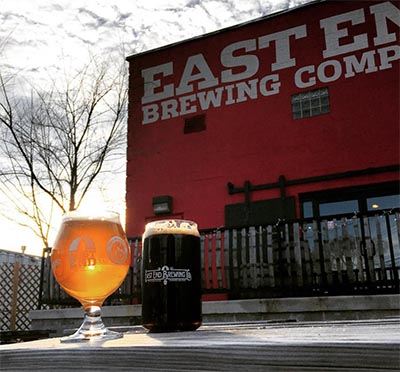
- Outdoor patio with beer at East End Brewing
- Interactive map of East End Brewing Company
- Location: 147 Julius Street, Pittsburgh (2012-present); 6923 Susquehanna Street, Pittsburgh (2004-2012)
- Opened: December 2004
- Owner: Scott Smith
- Website: www.eastendbrewing.com

East End Brewing Company is a Pittsburgh brewery. According to the Pittsburgh Post-Gazette, it is a "force in the local beer market."

Owner Scott Smith founded the brewery after quitting his job with a consumer products company. The brewery started selling beer in December 2004.

The brewery was originally located in a 4,000-square-foot (370 m^{2}) brewery in the Homewood neighborhood of Pittsburgh's East End. In 2011, the company began pursuing a move to a 17,000-square-foot building in the nearby Larimer neighborhood, and completed that move in November of 2012. In order to finance the move, Smith sold $1,000 vouchers to customers/investors, which will be redeemable for future beer, merchandise and special access to new brews. The move was completed in November 2012. The new location will allow production to increase from 2,500 barrels brewed per year to 5,000 barrels.

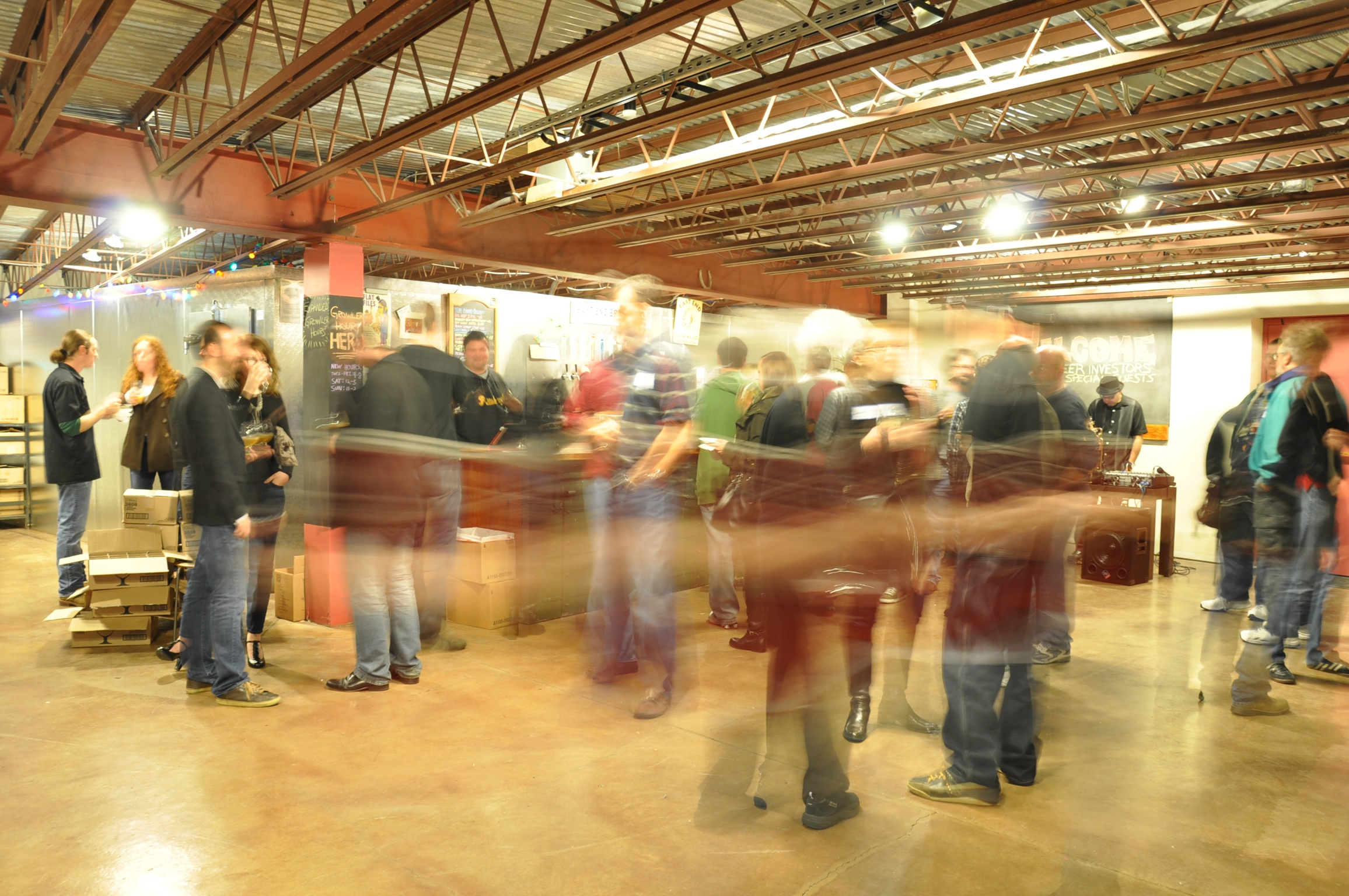
Tap and tasting room at East End Brewing Company Pittsburgh (Larimer) location.

In 2008, it sold 700 barrels; in 2010 it sold 1,800 barrels of beer. Sales are primarily done through growlers and kegs sold to local bars. In 2010, sales were expanded to the Pittsburgh Public Market in the Strip District.

As of 2010, there were 28 varieties of beer. Big Hop is the flagship beer. Specialty beer varieties include Big Hop Harvest Ale, and Gratitude barleywine. Smith delivered the bike-themed beer Pedal Pale Ale via bike trailer. Smith commemorated the enactment of a smoking ban within Allegheny County with "Smokestack" smoked porter.

The brewery is closely associated with Pittsburgh. The Pittsburgh Post-Gazette cited East End Brewing as an example of Pittsburgh's superior beer culture compared to Philadelphia's. Demand for East End beer spiked after the Pittsburgh Steelers won Super Bowl XLIII.

In 2012, Pittsburgh Magazine named it one of the best breweries in Pittsburgh. It is among the most popular Pittsburgh businesses on Twitter.

April of 2023 brought East End's first satellite location: a taproom in the Mt. Lebanon suburb of Pittsburgh.

== Special events ==
In 2007, after mistakenly ordering a quadruple batch of New York-grown cascade and centennial hops for his Big Hop Harvest beer, Smith shared his hops with local breweries for a "Wet-Hopped Beer Festival" at an East Liberty bar. Church Brew Works, John Harvard's Brew House, Rivertowne Pour House, Johnstown Brewing, Victory Brewing participated by using the excess hops.

In 2008, the company was threatened by high hops prices. After the prices eased in 2009, East End Brewing celebrated with a specially brewed beer called "Out of the Woods."

The brewery was the final stop on the 2012 Venture Outdoors hike; successful hikers were rewarded with a beer.

=== Pedal Pale Ale Keg Ride ===
The Pedal Pale Ale Keg Ride is a charity cycling event hosted by East End Brewing Company each year to ceremonially deliver the first keg(s) of the summer seasonal Pedal Pale Ale from the brewery to a location unknown to the participants of the ride. Since its inception in 2006, the number of participants has grown to 600 in 2012.

== Gallery ==
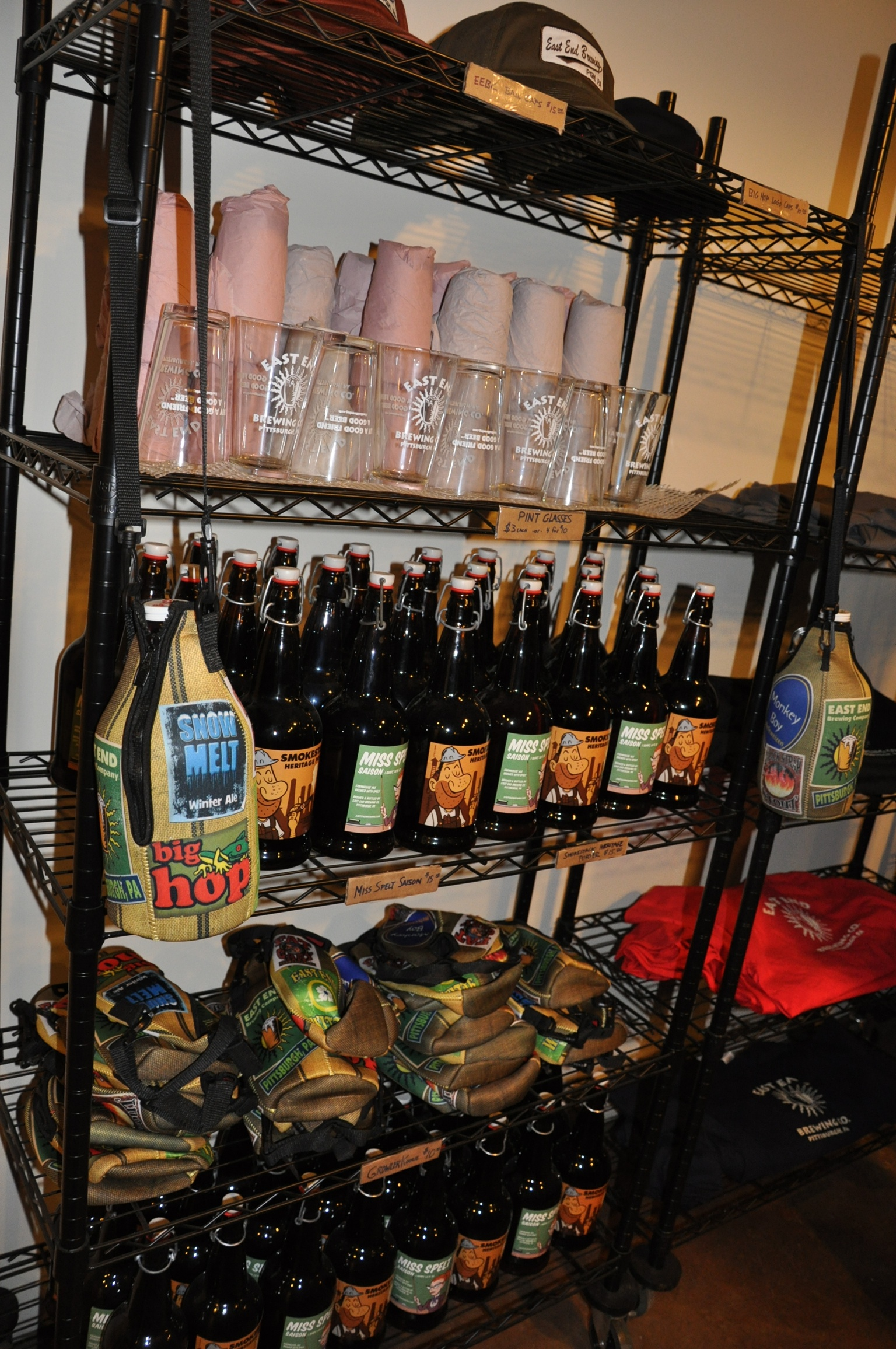
East End Brewing Company merchandise shelf at Pittsburgh (Larimer) location.

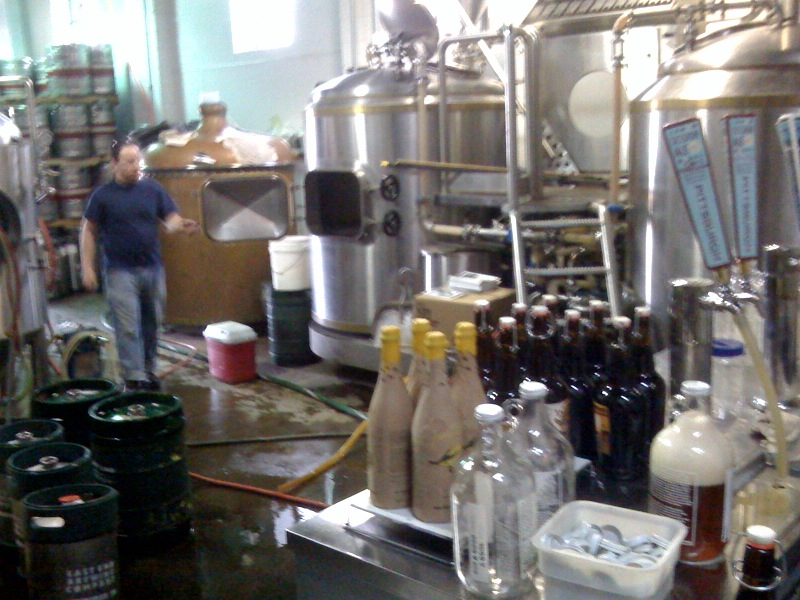
Brewery equipment at the Homewood location

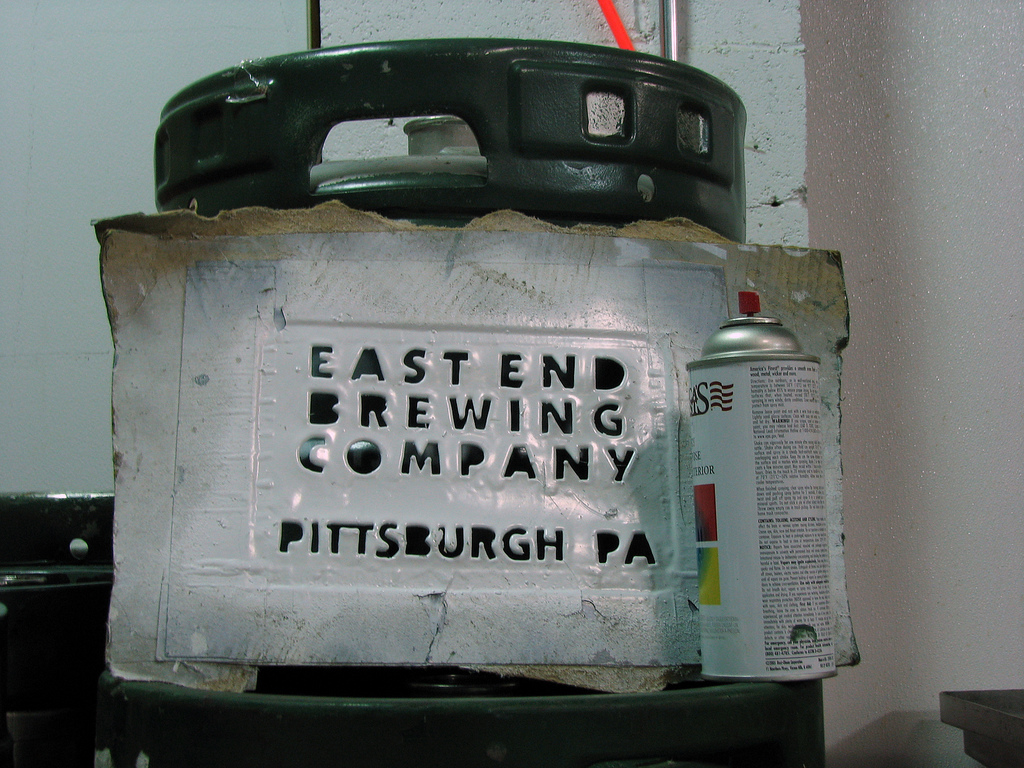
A keg tagged with a stencil

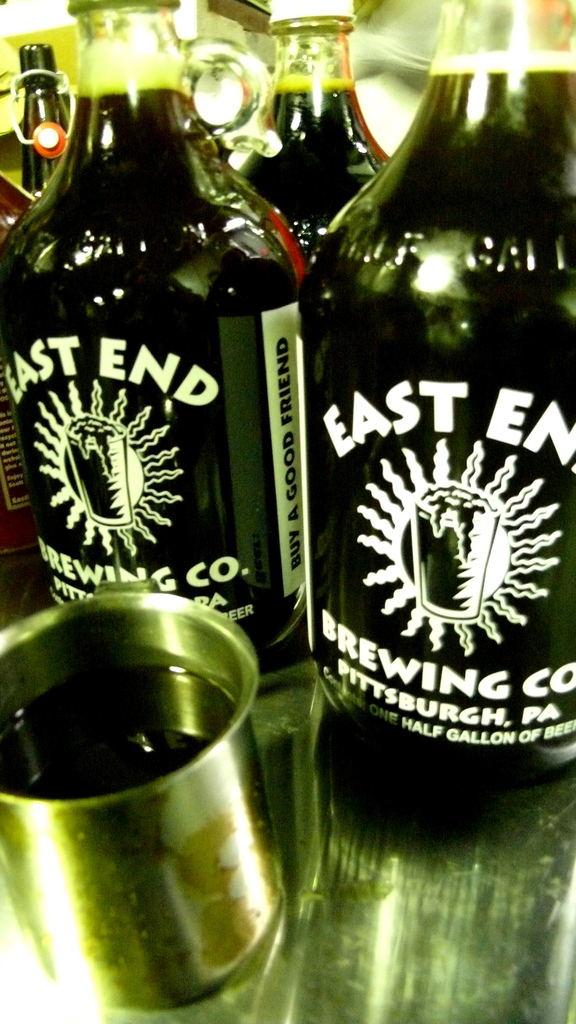
Growlers
