= Samuel F. B. Morse School =

- U.S. National Register of Historic Places
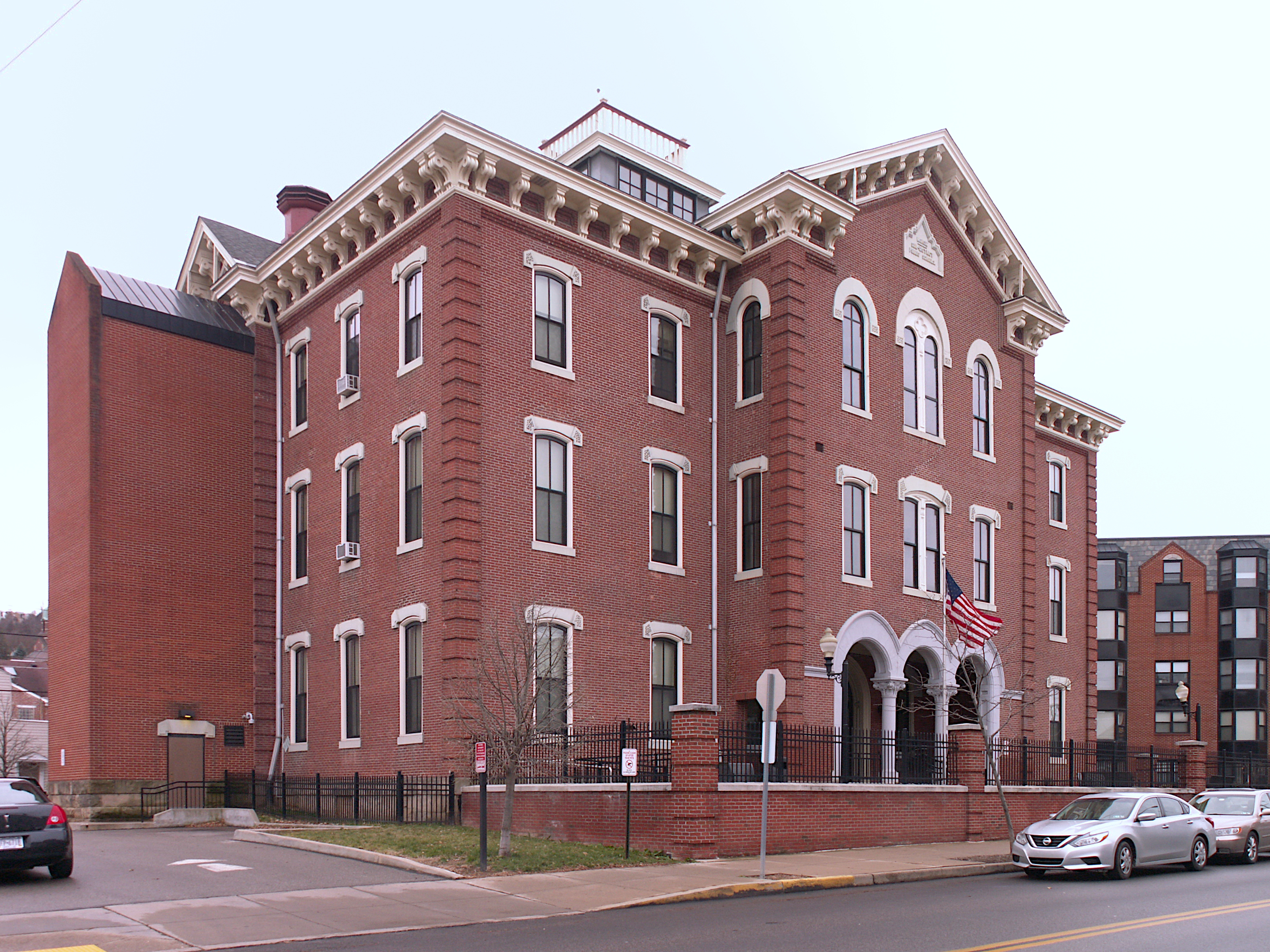
- The former school in 2020

- Location within Pittsburgh Location within Pennsylvania Location within the United States
- Location: 2418 Sarah Street (South Side Flats), Pittsburgh, Pennsylvania, USA
- Coordinates: 40°25′36.72″N 79°58′14.52″W
- Built: 1874
- Architect: Thomas D. Evans
- Architectural style: Italianate
- NRHP reference No.: 86002694
- Added to NRHP: September 30, 1986

The Samuel F. B. Morse School is a former elementary school located at 2418 Sarah Street in the South Side Flats neighborhood of Pittsburgh, Pennsylvania. Built in 1874, it was named in honor of Samuel Morse, commonly credited as the inventor of the telegraph.

Today, it is an apartment building known as "Morse Gardens".

== History ==
The school was built in 1874 and dedicated on January 15, 1875. It was named after Samuel Morse, credited as one of the main contributors to the invention of the telegraph. The school originally served an area of German, Scotch-Irish, and Welsh immigrants, who floated a $66,000 bond issue in order to build the school.

The school closed in 1979 and was sold to the Pittsburgh Housing Authority, which converted it to a 70-unit senior housing facility called Morse Gardens. The former school building houses 30 apartments, while the other 40 are in a five-story addition which replaced a former school annex building.

It was added to the National Register of Historic Places on September 30, 1986.

== Architecture ==
The Morse School is a three-story brick building in the Italianate style. It was designed by Welsh-American architect Thomas D. Evans (1844–1903), who was particularly known for school buildings. It has been speculated that Evans also designed the Springfield Public School in the Strip District based on the similarity between the two buildings.

The front elevation is seven bays wide, with a projecting, three-bay center section. The original front entrance is set behind an arcade of three pointed arches supported by Corinthian columns. The gable above the main entrance is marked with a stone bearing the name of the school. The windows are arched, with Italianate trim. The roof is hipped with central gables on three sides and a prominent cornice. The original belfry has been removed, but the school bell is still displayed inside the building.

The interior of the school had thirteen classrooms, along with a third-floor auditorium, organized around intersecting central hallways with a stairwell at either end. During the conversion to residential use, each classroom was turned into two one-bedroom apartments and the hallways were opened up into a three-story atrium.
