= Springfield Public School =

- U.S. National Register of Historic Places
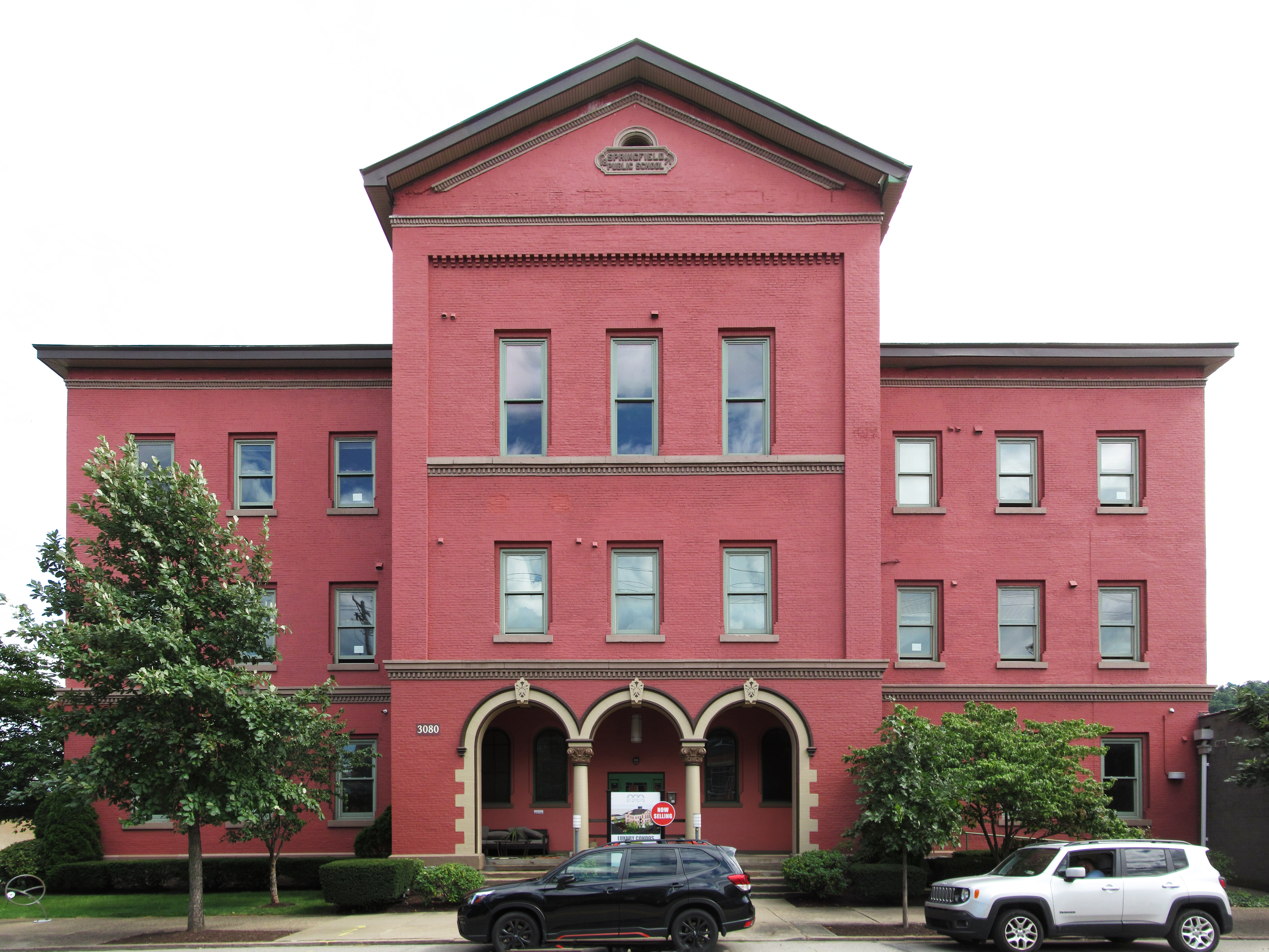
- The building in 2023

- Location within Pittsburgh Location within Pennsylvania Location within the United States
- Location: Smallman and Thirty-first Sts., Pittsburgh, Pennsylvania
- Coordinates: 40°27′36″N 79°58′17″W
- Area: less than one acre
- Built: 1871–72
- Architect: Thomas D. Evans (possible)
- Architectural style: Italianate
- MPS: Pittsburgh Public Schools TR
- NRHP reference No.: 86002711
- Added to NRHP: September 30, 1986

The Springfield Public School located in the Strip District neighborhood of Pittsburgh, Pennsylvania, was built in 1872 and closed in 1934. After closing it served as a warehouse. The building was listed on the National Register of Historic Places in 1986.

== History ==
The school was built in 1871–72. At the time, Pittsburgh's public schools were organized into sub-districts which were generally coterminous with the city's political wards, though some of the larger wards had multiple sub-districts. The O'Hara sub-district, which served the 12th Ward or present-day Strip District from about 19th Street to 31st Street, had a large number of students and was split in 1870 to create the Springfield sub-district. A temporary school, which students nicknamed "the Shanty", opened in September, 1870. Work began on a permanent school the following year with a cornerstone laying ceremony on June 28, 1871, and the new school opened in September, 1872.

The Springfield School served a crowded, working-class immigrant neighborhood which was considered a "problem section" by social reformers. As a result, the school was a center for various educational and social programs. As the Pittsburgh Press described it in 1895,

Though not among the largest in the city, the Springfield sub-district school, of the Twelfth ward, is one of the most interesting and efficient public schools in the western part of the state. It is not a showy school, as it is located in a mill district, and the building itself is grimy with the smoke and soot from the neighboring steel and iron works. The pupils are for the most part from the families of mill workers, and while they are perhaps as bright as those of any other class, they are, in many instances, compelled to leave school and go to work long before completing the ward school course.

In 1893, one of Pittsburgh's first kindergartens opened at the Springfield School. It was also one of the first Pittsburgh schools to adopt the sloyd manual training curriculum popularized in Sweden, with classes beginning in 1894. In 1911, the local Council of Jewish Women inaugurated Pittsburgh's first "penny lunch" program at the Springfield School, providing hot lunches for a price of one cent per item, which was affordable for low-income students. After the success of this program, Pittsburgh Public Schools rolled out district-wide school lunches beginning in 1914. The Springfield School also offered night school classes and had its own branch of the Carnegie Library.

As the Strip District became more industrial in character, enrollment at the Springfield School declined from around 400 in 1894 to only 113 in 1934. That year, the Pittsburgh school board voted to close the school as a cost-saving measure. The students were reassigned to the Lawrence and O'Hara elementary schools and the Arsenal kindergarten. After closing, the building was used as a warehouse by the school district until 1946, when it was sold. It remained in use as a warehouse by later owners including the Crucible Steel Company and a salvage business. The building was converted to condominiums around 2007.

== Architecture ==
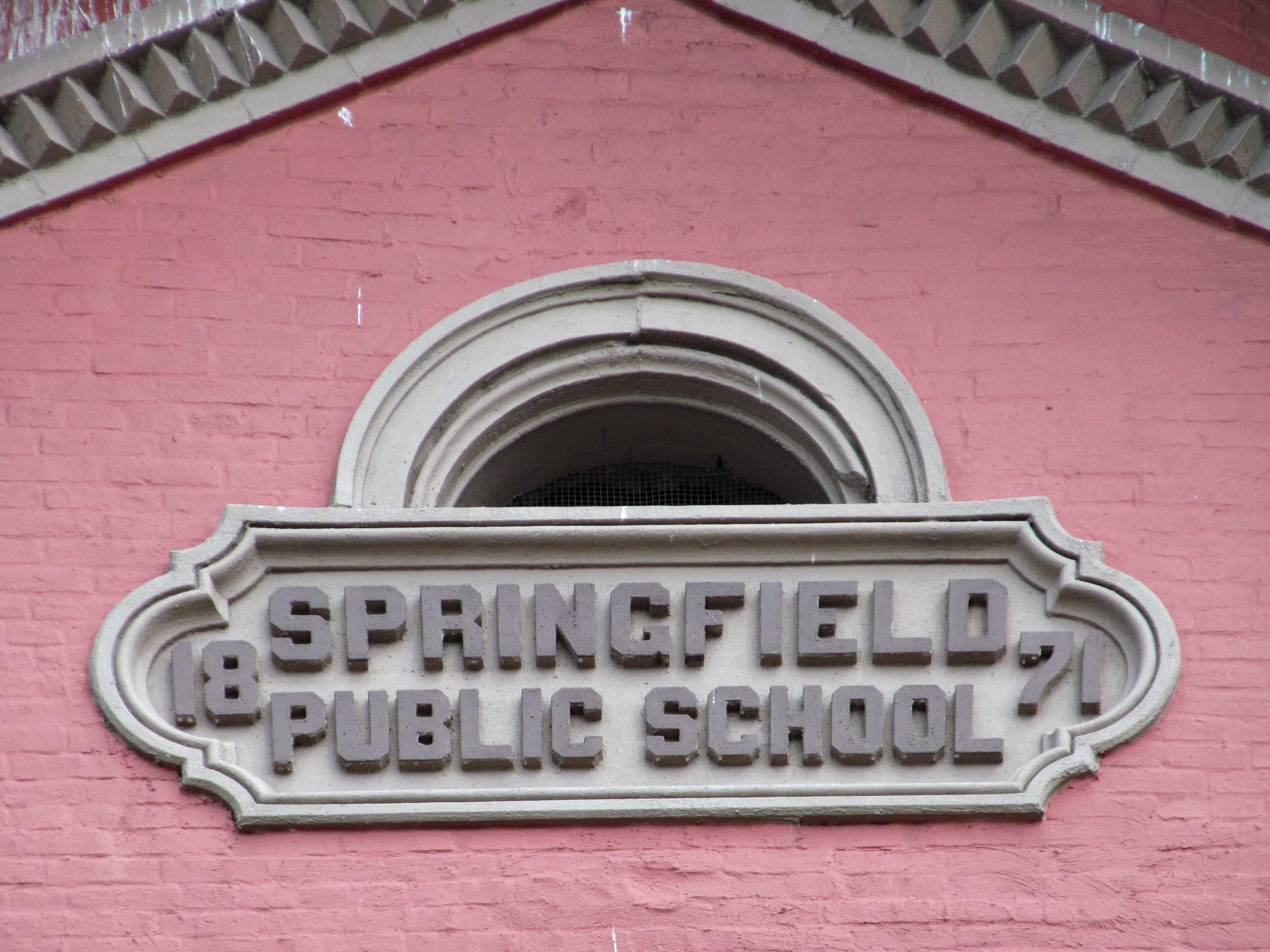
Detail of the datestone

The Springfield School is a three-story brick building in the Italianate style. The architect is not known for certain but has been speculated to be Thomas D. Evans (1844–1903), the architect of the Samuel F. B. Morse School on the South Side, based on the similarity between the two buildings.

The front elevation is nine bays wide, with a projecting, three-bay center section. The front entrance is set behind a three-arched arcade supported by Corinthian columns. The gable above the main entrance is marked with a datestone bearing the name of the school and the year 1871. The windows were originally arched, with Italianate trim, but were later replaced with rectangular windows. A belfry on top of the building was also removed.

The side elevations are five bays wide with slightly projecting stair towers. The rear elevation is similar to the front, though lacking an entrance, and has a tall freestanding chimney.
