= Pittsburgh Public Market =

Coordinates: 40.45377°N 79.98034°W

- Interactive map of Pittsburgh Public Market

Restaurant information
- Location: Pittsburgh, Allegheny County, Pennsylvania

Pittsburgh Public Market is a public market in the Strip District of Pittsburgh. The Pittsburgh Public Market focuses on locally sourced fare. It is managed by an organization called the Market Council, which was created by Neighbors in the Strip.

Its origin traces back to 2003, when a community organization called Neighbors in the Strip began plans to revive a public market in the Strip District, which once was home to a number of different public markets. By 2005, the project was attracting investment from Pennsylvania Department of Community and Economic Development, the Urban Redevelopment Authority of Pittsburgh, the Community Design Center of Pittsburgh, Pittsburgh Partnership for Neighborhood Development, PNC Bank, the United States Department of Health and Human Services, the Richard King Mellon Foundation and the Pennsylvania Department of Agriculture's Direct Farm Sales Program. The original location was a 10,000-square-foot space in a Strip District produce terminal.

In October 2013, it moved to a 25,000-square-foot location at 2401 Penn Avenue. The Pittsburgh Post-Gazette described the new location as a "bunker." In 2014, the Pittsburgh Public Market opened the Market Kitchen, a shared commercial cooking space, at its Strip District location; its $600,000 startup cost was Mary Hillman Jennings Foundation, the Allegheny County Development Community Infrastructure and Tourism Fund, the U.S. Department of Health and Human Services' Office of Community Services and a Kickstarter.

== Tenants ==
- East End Brewery
- Wheel and Wedge, a cheese shop
