= Primanti Bros. =

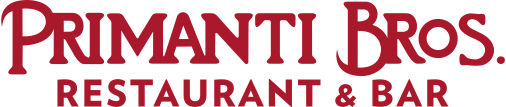

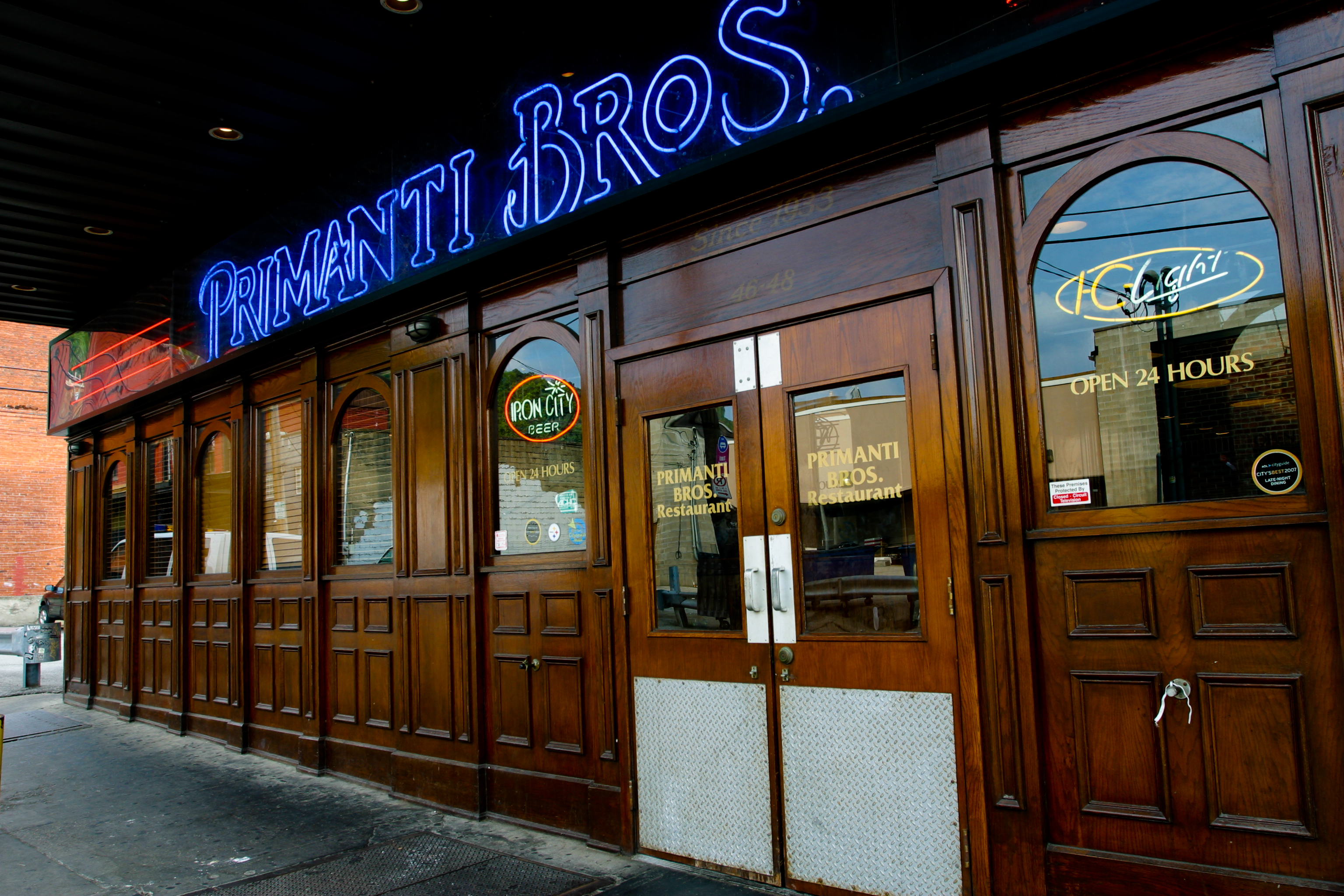
- The storefront of the original Primanti Bros. in the Strip District neighborhood of Pittsburgh, Pennsylvania
- Interactive map of Primanti Bros.

Restaurant information
- Established: 1933
- Owner: Authentic Restaurant Brands
- Food type: North American cuisine sandwich shop
- Dress code: Casual
- Location: Pittsburgh, Pennsylvania, United States
- Coordinates: 40°27′2.55″N 79°59′8.12″W (original Strip District location)
- Other locations: 41
- Website: www.primantibros.com

Primanti Bros. sandwich
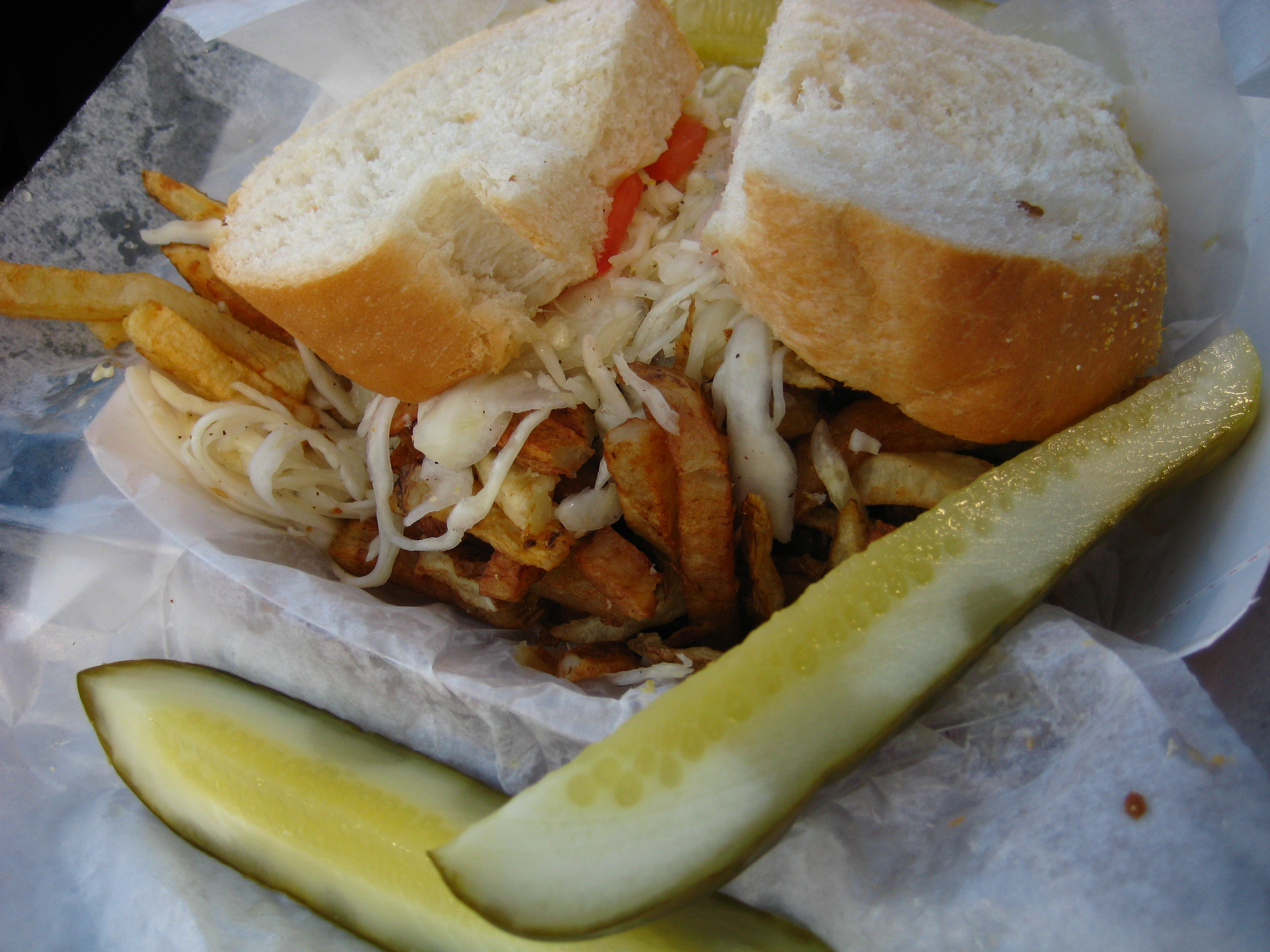
- Type: Sandwich
- Place of origin: United States
- Region or state: Pennsylvania (mainly western)
- Created by: Primanti Bros.
- Main ingredients: grilled meat, melted cheese, an oil & vinegar-based coleslaw, tomato slices, and French fries (on the sandwich) between two thick slices of Italian bread

Primanti Bros. (/prɪˈmænti/, locally /pər-/), sometimes called Primanti's for short, is a chain of casual dining sandwich shops in the eastern United States. Since its Pittsburgh founding in 1933, Primanti's has become a cultural icon of the region. The chain is known for its signature sandwiches made of grilled meat, melted cheese, an oil and vinegar-based coleslaw, tomato slices, and French fries between two thick slices of Italian bread.

During the 2007 James Beard Foundation Awards, Primanti's was named as one of "America's Classic" restaurants.

== History ==
In 1933, the first Primanti's opened at 46 Eighteenth Street in Pittsburgh's Strip District, a busy area along the Allegheny River. At the time, the Strip District was a major industrial center in Pittsburgh, filled with factories, warehouses, and shipyards. According to the restaurant, Joe Primanti was born in suburban Wilmerding, Pennsylvania, and eventually invented the restaurant's sandwich during the Great Depression. His brothers, Dick and Stanley, later joined him. The Primantis opened their restaurant at the corner of Smallman and Eighteenth Street in the Strip District, which still stands today. The restaurant primarily served the late-night and early-morning blue-collar workers who unloaded produce in the area.

The tradition of the signature sandwiches was to combine their typical sandwich (grilled meat, melted cheese, and tomatoes on Italian bread) with its usual sides, french fries and coleslaw, added onto the sandwich in order to form a singular binding unit. The sandwich's design and packaging was created to reduce spillage for busy depression-era truck drivers in Pittsburgh's Strip District, allowing them to eat one-handed on the job instead of sitting down at a deli counter.

With the passing of Stanley Primanti in the early 1970s and John in 1974, Dick decided to sell the business to Jim Patrinos in 1975. Today, there are 16 Pittsburgh area locations, including Pittsburgh International Airport, and the city's major sports venues PNC Park, Acrisure Stadium, and PPG Paints Arena, as well as several other locations throughout the eastern United States.

In recent years, it has become tradition for players selected by the Pittsburgh Steelers in the NFL draft to visit the original Primanti Bros. location in the Strip District upon their arrival to the city. Notable picks include 2017 NFL draft first- and second-round picks, T. J. Watt, and JuJu Smith-Schuster, as well as 2019 NFL draft first-round pick, Devin Bush Jr.

In 2022, Primanti Bros. was visited by President Joe Biden and Senator John Fetterman.

=== Sports-themed specials ===
The chain expressed its support for the Pittsburgh Penguins during their back-to-back Stanley Cup championships in their 2015–16 and 2016–17 seasons, releasing two limited-time sandwiches in their honor. The 2016 sandwich honored the Penguins' third line, Carl Hagelin, Nick Bonino and Phil Kessel, and was named the "HBK Sandwich". Late into the 2017 season, the chain then introduced the "Canadian Pitts-Burger", honoring goaltender Marc-André Fleury during his final season with the Penguins. The Canadian bacon sandwich was available at all Primanti Bros. locations for a limited time.

== Locations ==
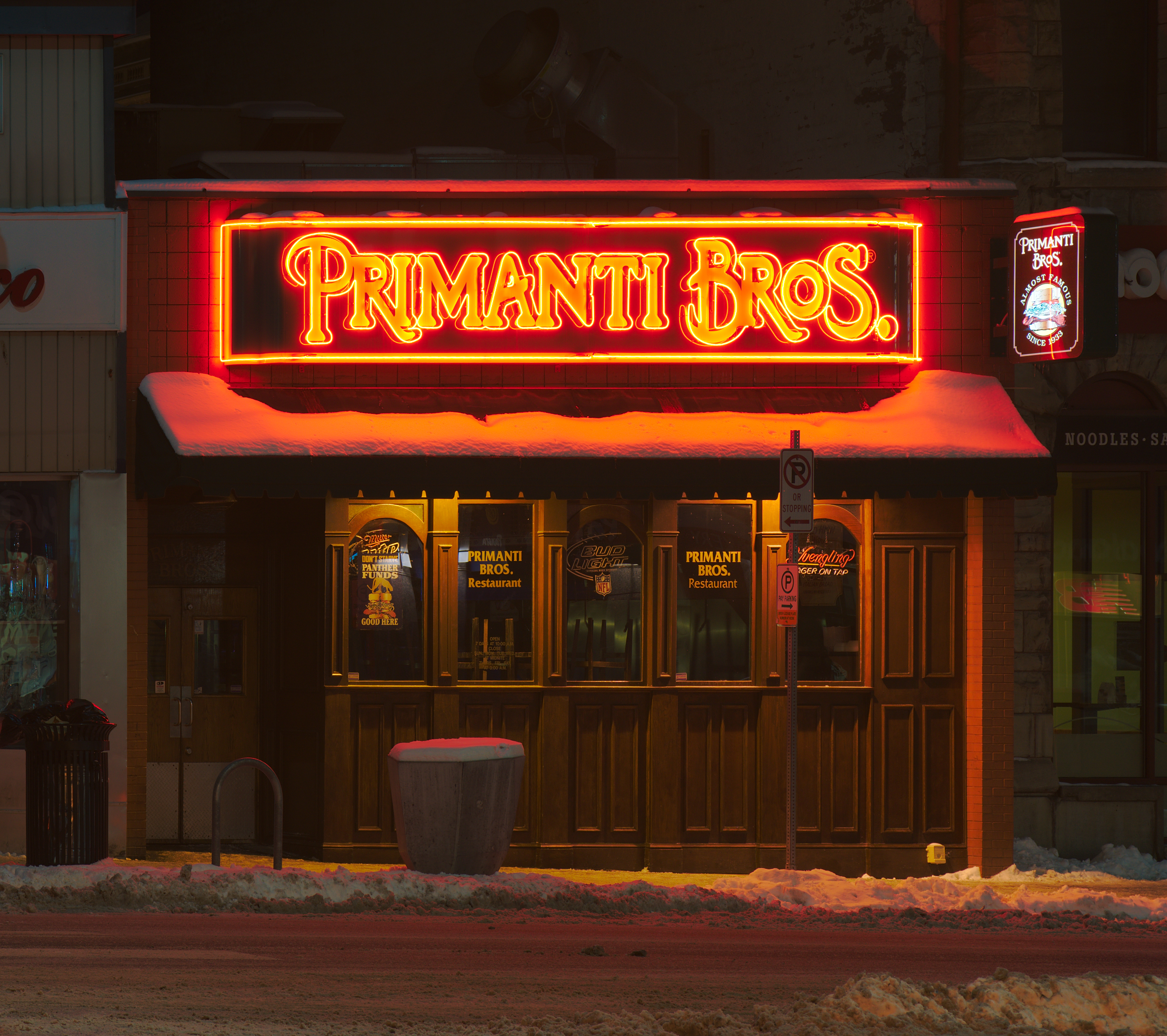
Primanti Bros. location in Oakland

Primanti Bros. locations are found throughout Pennsylvania, particularly in and around Pittsburgh. In addition to other Pennsylvania locations, restaurants have been established in Florida, Ohio, West Virginia, Indiana, and Maryland.

== Reception ==
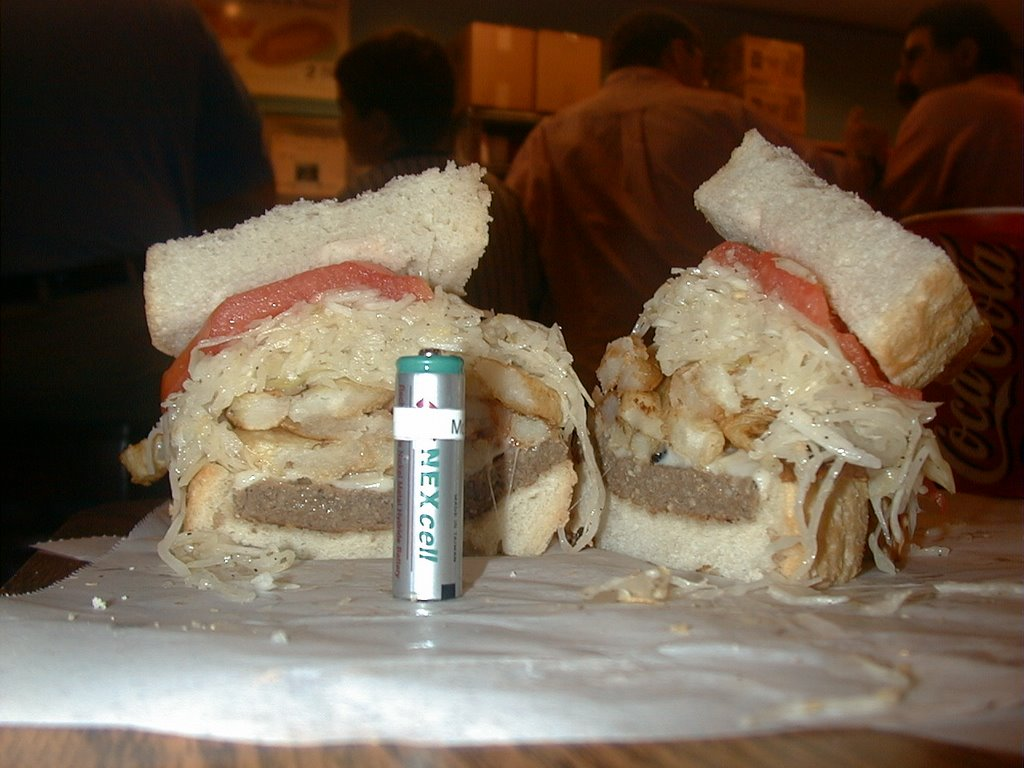
The Primanti Bros. Pitts-Burger sandwich. The AA battery, used as a size reference, is 2 inches (5 cm) tall.

The restaurant and its signature sandwich have been featured in several national publications and television shows, including National Geographic magazine, Man v. Food, and Adam Richman's Best Sandwich in America. Primanti Bros. made the Pittsburgh Post-Gazette's list of "1,000 Places to See Before You Die in the USA and Canada", and their sandwich is a featured Pittsburgh landmark on Yinztagram.

The restaurant was mentioned on the April 21, 2008, episode of The Daily Show with Jon Stewart in an interview with Senator Barack Obama. Stewart suggested that Obama visit the restaurant for its "great sandwiches", which Stewart had enjoyed as a comedian on the club circuit.

An ESPN.com rating of PNC Park mentioned that the stadium's "best [concession] item is the famous Primanti Brothers sandwich, a Pittsburgh institution", and granted this "signature concession item" an exuberant score of "5+++" (out of 5). This helped PNC Park to achieve its overall #1 ranking in the feature.

=== Credit card lawsuit and settlement ===
On March 9, 2011, following a claim by a customer that the restaurant's credit card receipts revealed too many of the digits of a customer's credit card number, a settlement between Primanti Bros. and the customer was reached. As part of the settlement, the restaurant agreed to provide affected customers with a free menu item and a side dish or non-alcoholic drink. The restaurant also agreed to make a donation of $25,000 to the Carnegie Museums and pay up to $62,000 for the plaintiff's attorneys' costs.
