= Wholey's =

Pittsburgh fish market

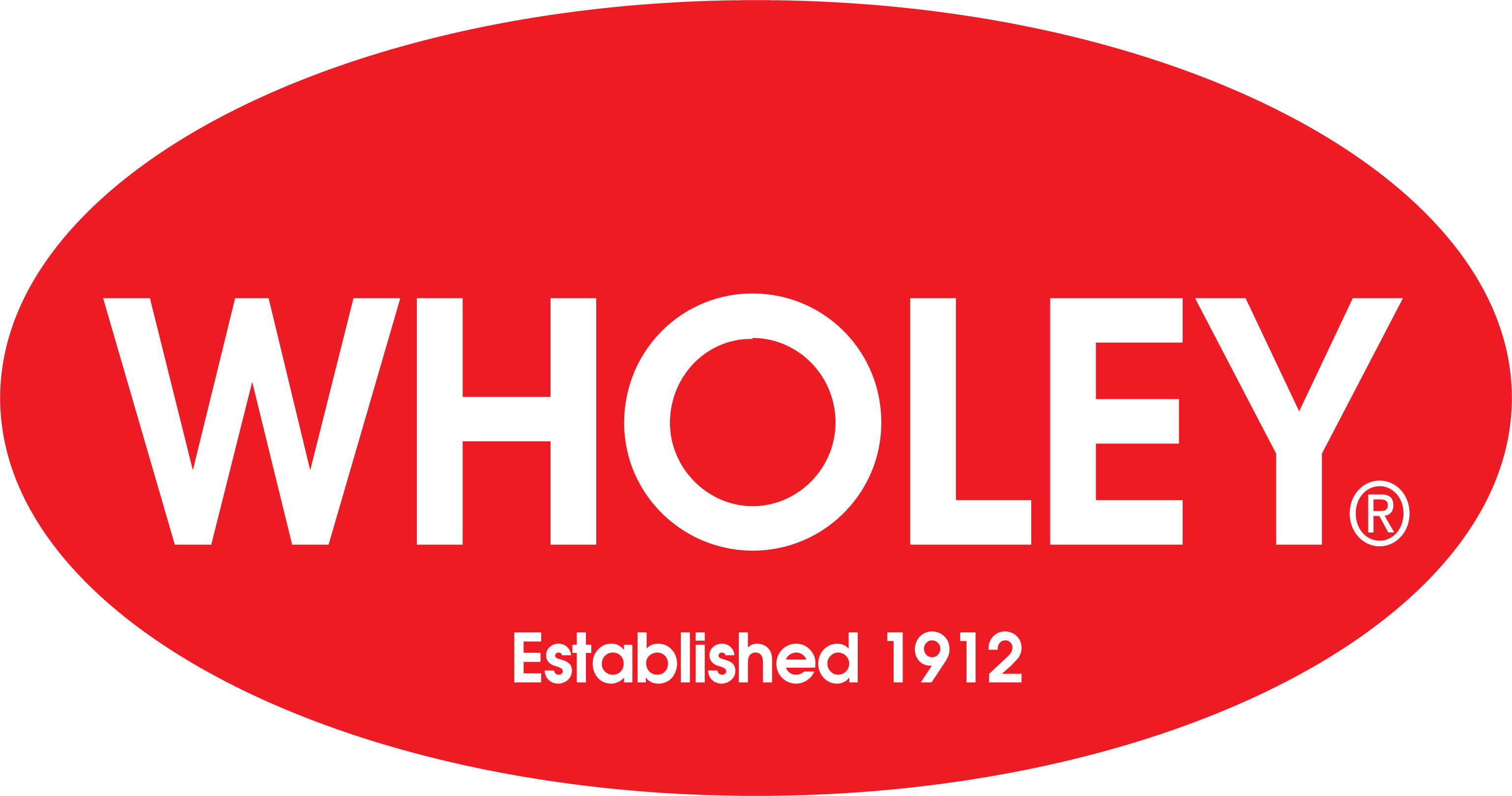
- Founded: 1912; 114 years ago
- Founder: Robert L. Wholey
- Headquarters: Pittsburgh, Pennsylvania
- Number of locations: 1
- Key people: Jim Wholey (President of Operations); Samuel Wholey (VP of Operations); Daniel Wholey (Treasurer)
- Products: Fish, Meat, Poultry
- Website: www.wholeysmarket.com

Wholey's /ˈwʊliːz/, officially known as Robert Wholey & Co. Inc., is a prominent fish market and grocery store in Pittsburgh's historic Strip District neighborhood. The store is known for its vintage decor, that includes a suspended model train, a bronze pig, and several animatronics. It also is home to a sushi bar and a fast-food style kitchen, as well as a dining room. In addition to the retail store, Wholey's also delivers fresh/frozen seafood and meat items across the United States.

== History ==
Robert L. Wholey opened the store in 1912 as a meat and live poultry shop located in the suburb of McKees Rocks, Pennsylvania, where it remained until 1948 when Robert L. Wholey's son, Robert C. Wholey moved it to Diamond Market, a market house in what is current day Market Square. It remained in operation at the market until the city razed the building to convert the area into a park in 1959. This prompted Robert C. to move the store once again to its current and final location in the Strip District.

Despite being known as a fishmonger, the business didn't offer any seafood until 1960, when it started importing fish from across the United States.

In 1980, Robert Wholey & Co. purchased the Federal Cold Storage building on Penn Ave, where it continued to operate until 2007, when it was sold to a Michigan firm. Demolition on the building, along with its iconic neon fish sign, began in 2021.

In 2012, Wholey's celebrated its 100th anniversary with a three–day celebration.

Luke Wholey, a member of the Wholey family, opened a seafood restaurant called Wild Alaskan Grille.

== Gallery ==
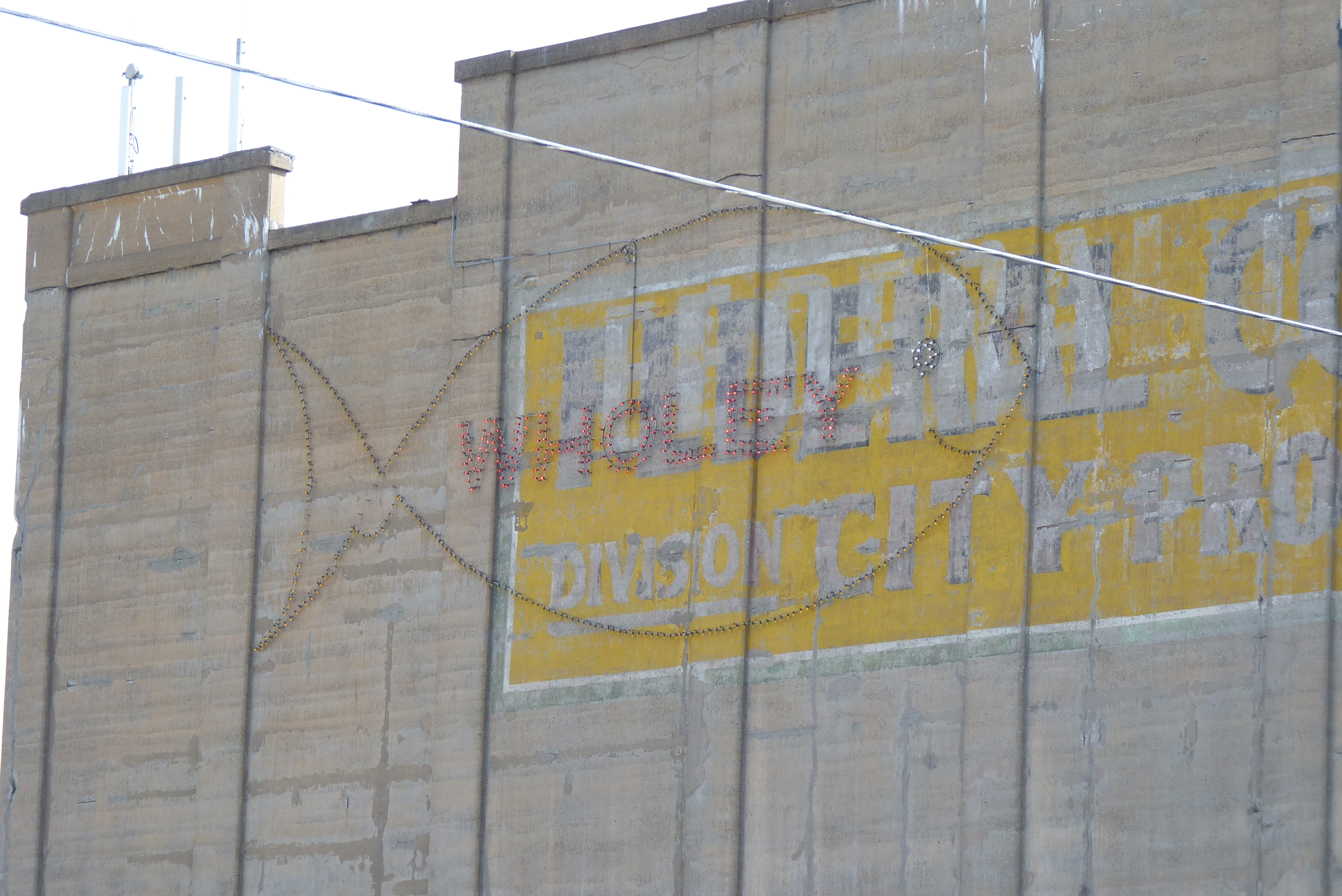
Wholey's famous fish sign, on the former Federal Cold Storage building

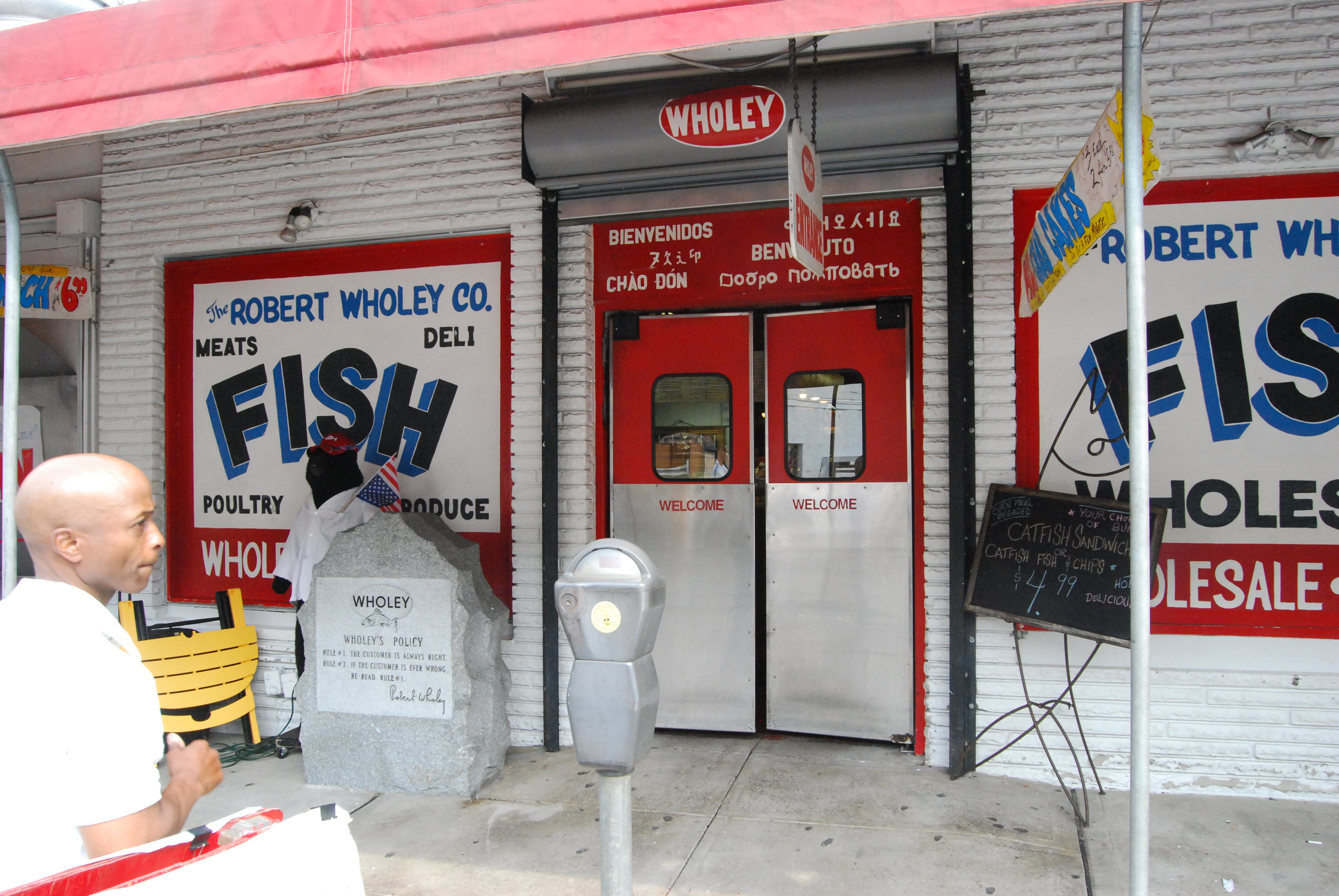
View of the entrance

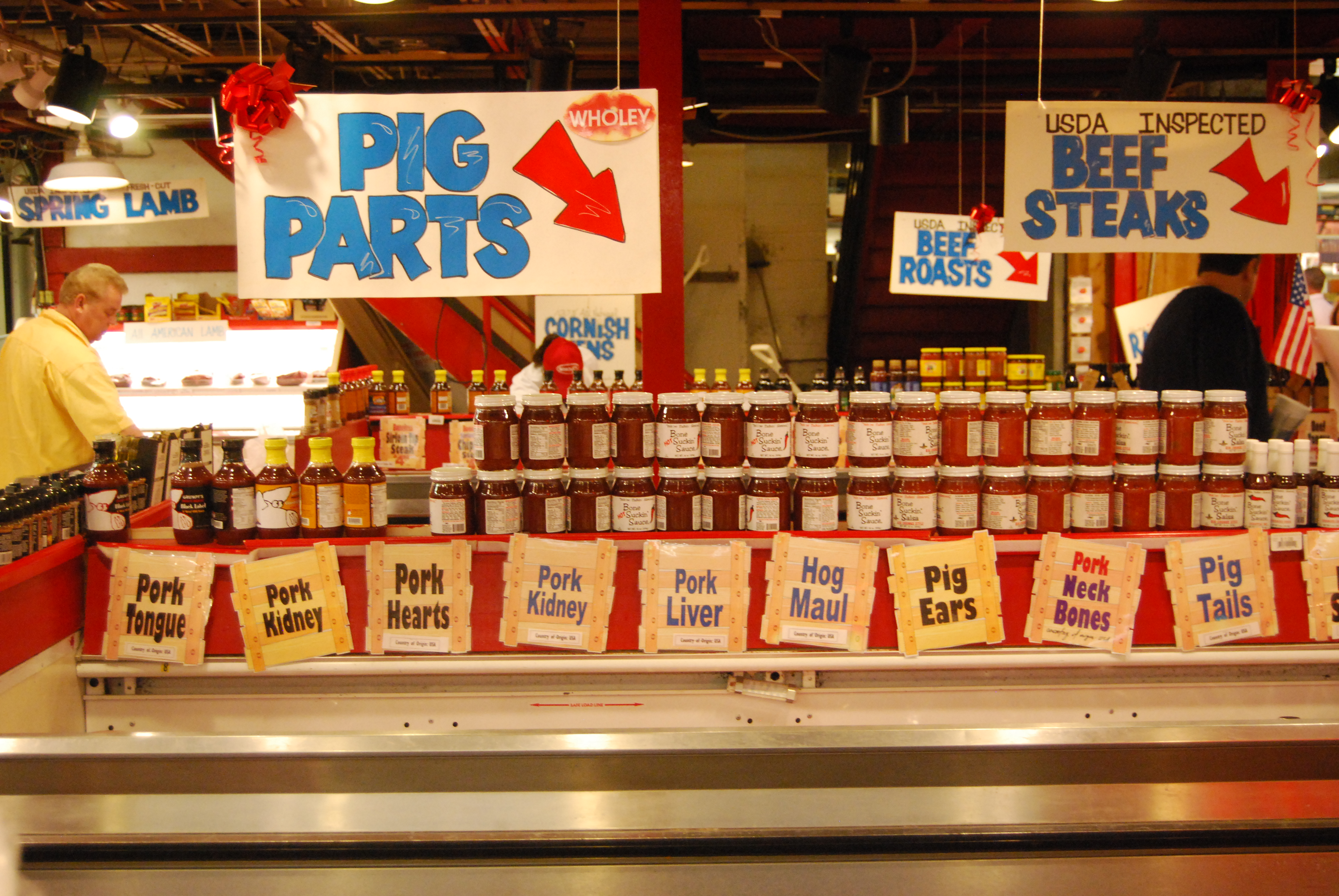
"Pig Parts" for sale at Wholey's

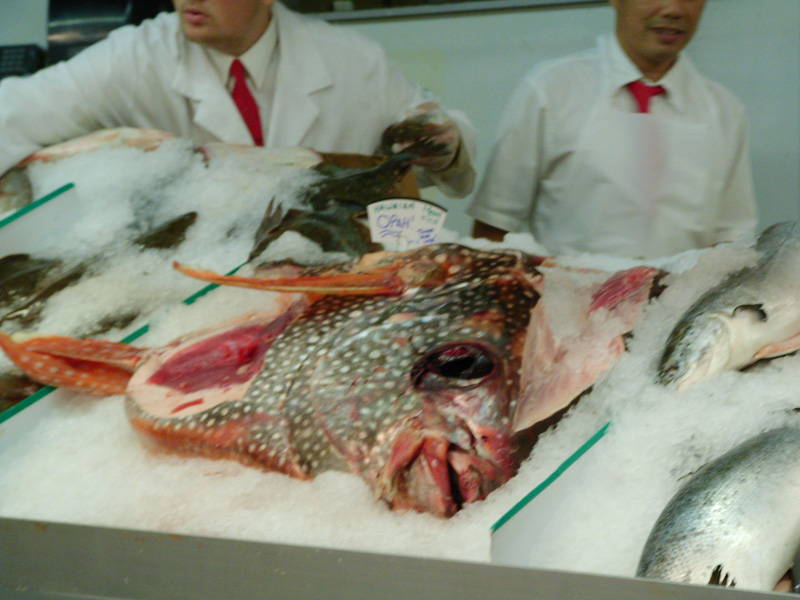
Fish at Wholey's

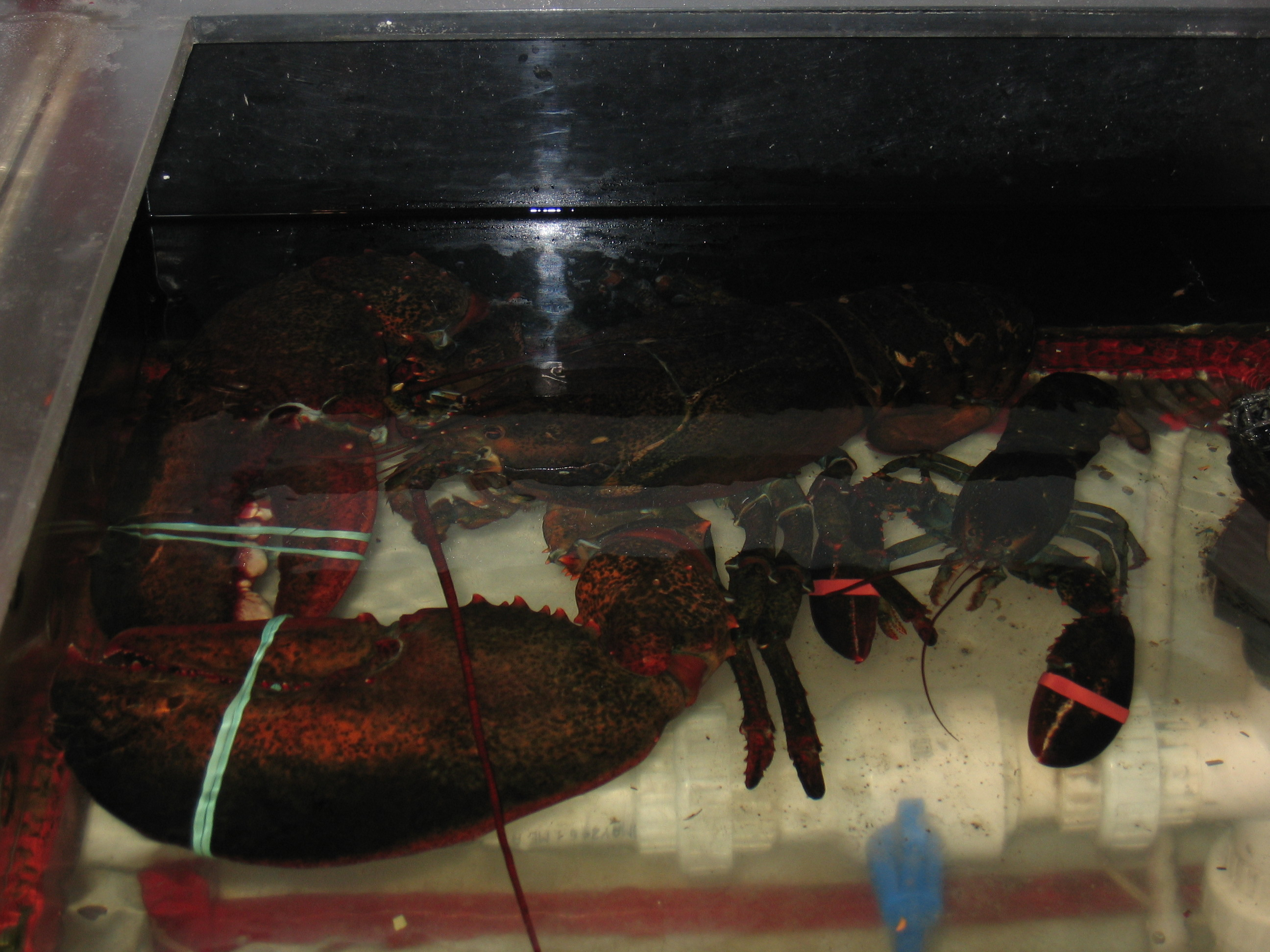
Bubba, a 22-pound lobster on display at the store
