= Bakery Square =

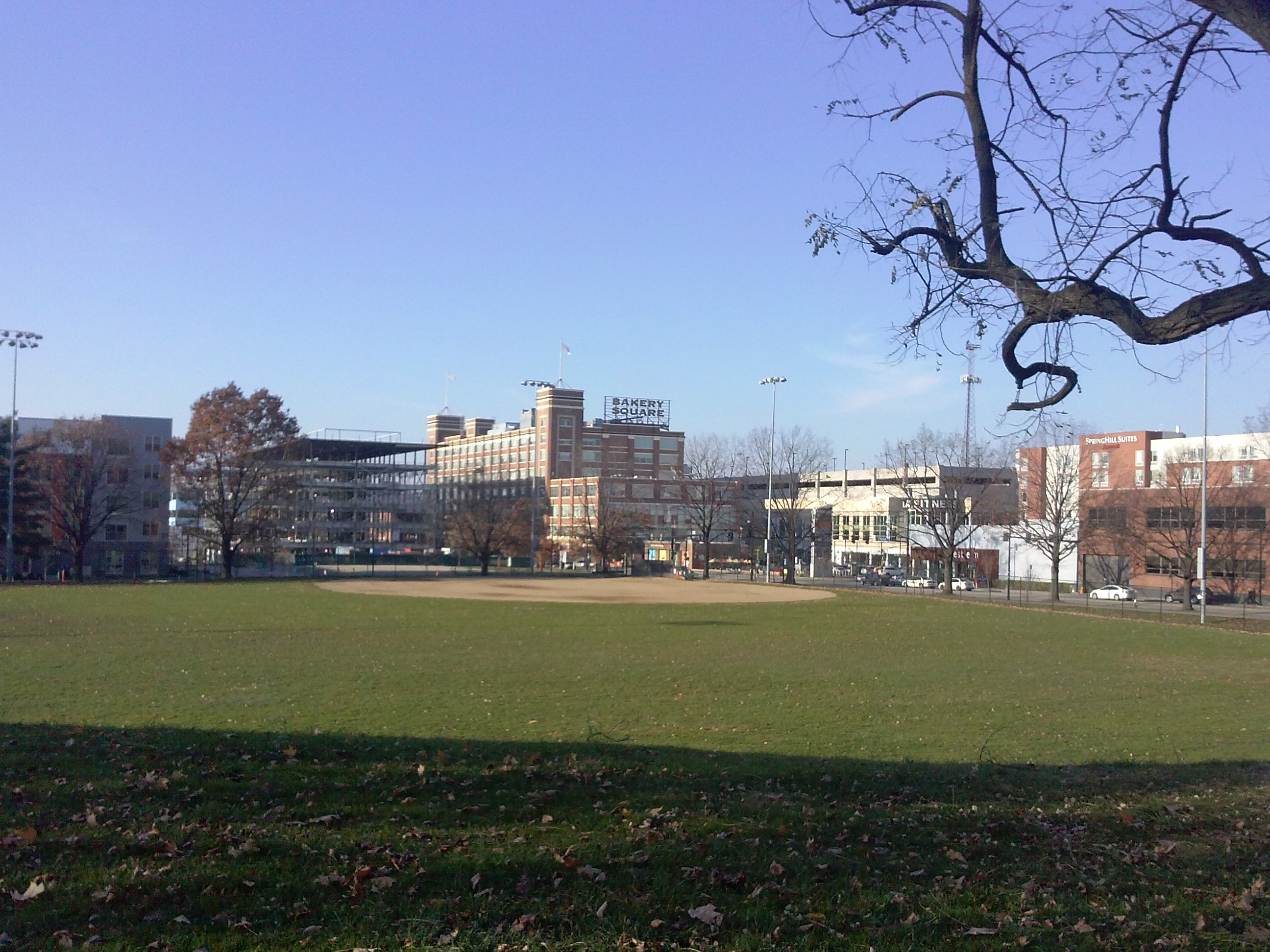
- View of Bakery Square from Mellon Park
- Location: Pittsburgh, Pennsylvania, United States
- Coordinates: 40°27′26″N 79°55′01″W
- Opened: Initial: 2009-2010; Phase 2: 2013-
- Developer: Walnut Capital
- Floor area: 352,540 ft^{2} (32,752 m^{2})
- Parking: 1,031 spaces
- Public transit: Port Authority bus: 71C, 74, 75, 77, 82, 86, 88, 89
- Website: bakery-square.com

Bakery Square is an open-air shopping and office development in the Pittsburgh neighborhood of Larimer, adjacent to the neighborhoods of Shadyside and East Liberty in the city's East End. Bakery Square is located on 5.1 acres along Penn Avenue.

== History ==
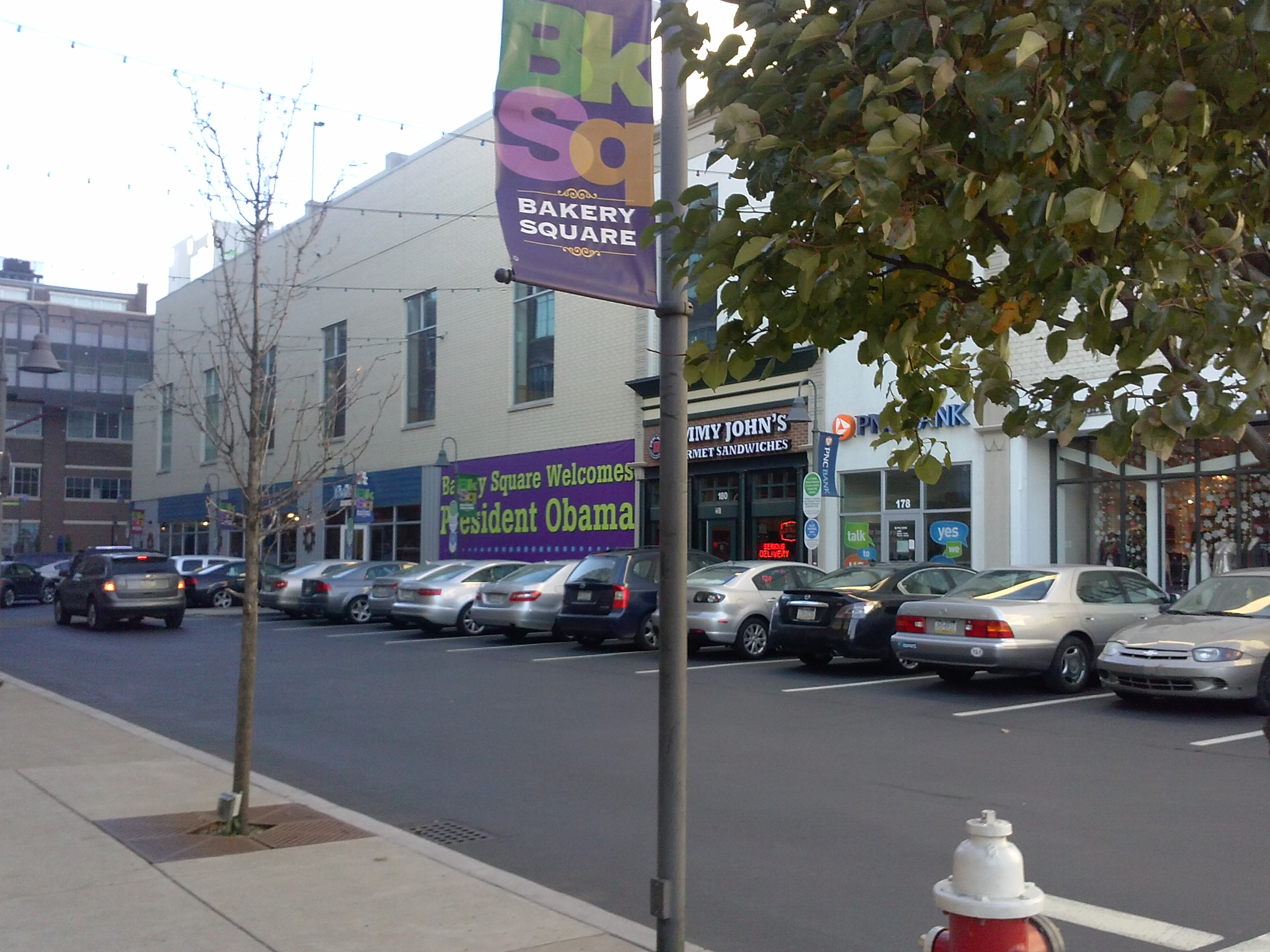
Sign commemorating the visit of President Barack Obama.

The main Bakery Square building was built as a Nabisco factory in 1918 and operated until 1998. Regional Industrial Development Corporation of Southwest Pennsylvania bought the building in 1999 and leased it to the Atlantic Baking Company, which was subsequently merged with Bake-Line Group and then went bankrupt in 2004. In 2006, the City of Pittsburgh declared the building blighted, paving the way for a redevelopment plan by Walnut Capital in 2007. The building opened after remodeling in May 2010.

In June 2014, President Barack Obama visited TechShop, a workshop and prototyping studio, in Bakery Square.

== Office tenants ==
Bakery Square has approximately 950,000 square feet of office space. The campus is home to major tenants including:

- Google
- University of Pittsburgh, School of Health and Rehabilitation Sciences
  - Department of Rehabilitation Science and Technology
  - Human Engineering Research Laboratories
  - Department of Rehabilitation Science and Technology Continuing Education (RSTCE)
  - Masters of Science in Prosthetics and Orthotics Program
- Carnegie Mellon University
- Hellbender
- U.S. Army
- Sheetz
- U.S. Department of Veterans Affairs

=== Google ===
Google operates an office in Bakery Square. A piece of the Nabisco factory's original equipment, a large dough mixer, was left standing in homage to the site's industrial roots. As of January 2011, Google was leasing approximately 115,000 square feet (10,700 m^{2}) of office space in the complex, though not all of it was yet developed and filled with employees.

== Retail tenants ==
Bakery square has 90,000 square feet of retail space. Tenants include SpringHill Suites by Marriott, Anthropologie, FP Movement, West Elm, Tako Torta, Alta Via Pizzeria, City Kitchen, Jeni's Ice Cream, Panera, Starbucks, Jimmy John's, and L.A. Fitness.

== Bakery Square 2.0 ==
Walnut Capital successfully worked with Urban Redevelopment Authority of the City of Pittsburgh to purchase and subsequently demolish the former Reizenstein school. Construction began on a project named "Bakery Square 2.0," this new development will create a combination of new office space and residential development.

=== Bakery Living ===
With completion in early June 2014, the first of the two apartment buildings at the site opened to tenants. The project, designed by Strada Architecture LLC., is LEED Certified, with bio-retention on site, green roofs, porous paving, and bioswales. A second building was completed and opened for rent in June 2016.
