= Larimer (Pittsburgh) =

- Neighborhood of Pittsburgh
- Coordinates: 40.464°N 79.913°W
- Country: United States
- State: Pennsylvania
- County: Allegheny County
- City: Pittsburgh

Area
  - Total: 0.445 sq mi (1.15 km^{2})

Population (2010)
  - Total: 1,728
  - Density: 3,880/sq mi (1,500/km^{2})

Larimer is a neighborhood in the East End of the city of Pittsburgh, Pennsylvania in the United States. The neighborhood takes its name from William Larimer, who grew up in nearby Westmoreland County and, after making a fortune in the railroad industry, built a manor house overlooking East Liberty along a path that came to be called "Larimer Lane" and later Larimer Avenue.

== History ==
Larimer's daughter, Rachel, married James Mellon, son of Thomas Mellon, which brought what is now Larimer into the Mellon clan's control. As with East Liberty, the Mellons sold or rented this land and used the proceeds to finance Pittsburgh's coal, steel, and gas industries. A number of James Mellon's heirs used Larimer as a middle name, including Gulf Oil founder William Larimer Mellon, and they ensured that the present-day neighborhood took the name as well.

Larimer was originally settled by Germans in the later half of the 19th century. By the early 1900s Italians from Abruzzi, Calabria, Campania, Sicily and Northern Italians became the dominant ethnic group. These settlers were slightly better-off than their kinsmen who moved to Bloomfield around the same time: the residents of Bloomfield built modest frame row-houses, while those in Larimer built somewhat nicer detached brick homes with small yards. Before long, Larimer residents had built and were running concrete foundries and commercial bakeries along Lincoln Avenue towards Two-Mile Run (some of which still exist today), and a successful commercial district at the intersection of Larimer Avenue and Meadow Street, near the community's spiritual home of Our Lady Help of Christians Catholic Church (1898). In 1928, the Italian Sons and Daughters of America was founded in the neighborhood. Larimer was Pittsburgh's Little Italy until the 1960s.

As with other neighborhoods in Pittsburgh's East End, the 1960s were a turning point for Larimer. Some residents began to move to the suburbs in the early part of the decade, and this process was hastened by the urban renewal of East Liberty and the construction of a 320-unit housing project on Larimer Avenue near the entrance to Larimer from East Liberty. Today, aside from a few remaining businesses along Lincoln Avenue, no vestige of the neighborhood's Italian community remains (Our Lady Help of Christians was closed in 1992). The residents, largely African-American, are among the poorest in Pittsburgh.

== Geography ==
Larimer is surrounded on nearly all sides by small valleys, or "runs" in the vernacular: branches of Negley Run form a border between Larimer and Highland Park on the North-West, and between Larimer and Lincoln-Lemington on the North-East, while the last bit of Two-Mile Run, the present site of the East Busway, forms a border between Larimer and Homewood on the South-East. On the South-West, there is a natural passage from East Liberty to Larimer along Larimer Avenue. More than 60 years earlier, the city buried the stream that once carried floodwater to the river. Renowned entrepreneur and judge Thomas Mellon argued against it, saying that there was too much water to fit into an underground sewer line. “This run in cases of heavy rains is turned into a raging torrent which an eight-and-a-half foot sewer cannot carry off,” Mellon said in an 1887 article in the Pittsburgh Commercial Gazette.

== Housing and Urban Development Grant ==
In June 2014, Larimer successfully applied for and received a coveted $30 million grant to re-build the neighborhood, which was provided through the US Department of Housing and Development. The grant will provide over 350 units of mixed-income housing. The Mayor of Pittsburgh, William "Bill" Peduto, called the grant, "huge."

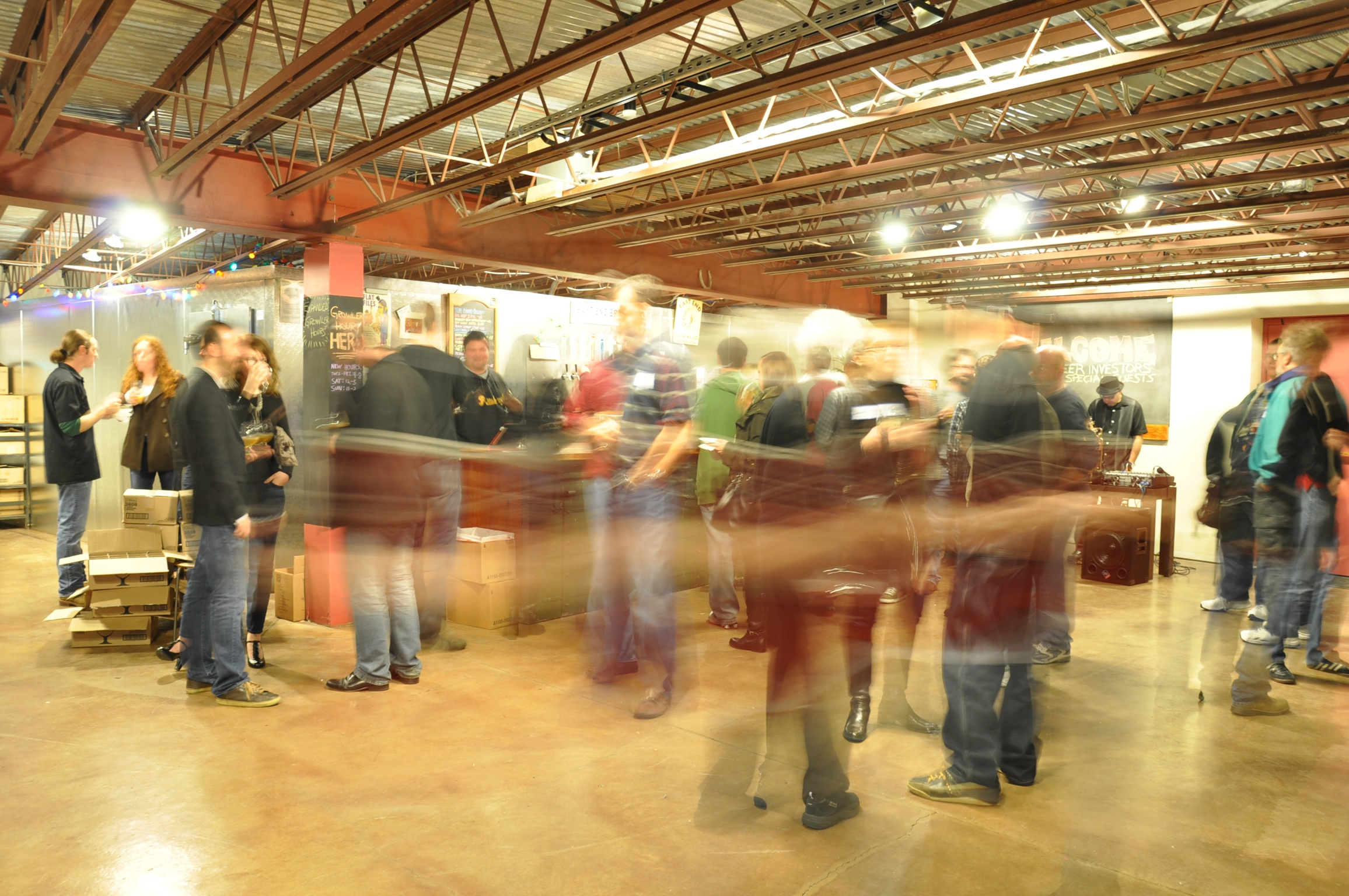
East End Brewing Company, Larimer

== See also ==
- Bakery Square
- List of Pittsburgh neighborhoods
