= Bar Marco =

Restaurant in Pittsburgh, Pennsylvania

Coordinates: 40.452511°N 79.981541°W

- Industry: Restaurant
- Founded: 2011 in Pittsburgh, Pennsylvania
- Founders: Kevin Cox, Justin Steel, Michael Kreha, and Bobby Fry
- Headquarters: 2216 Penn Ave, Pittsburgh, 15222, USA
- Owners: Kevin Cox and Justin Steel
- Website: barmarcopgh.com

Bar Marco is a restaurant and bar located in the Strip District of Pittsburgh, Pennsylvania. It was named one of the Top 50 Best New Restaurants by Bon Appétit Magazine, and was added to Thrillist’s Top 33 Cocktails Bars in the USA. Since 2013, it has been included on Pittsburgh Magazine's Best Restaurants every year excluding 2016.

It has a private Wine Room that seats ten and can be reserved for private wine pairing dinners.

Bar Marco was founded in 2011 by Kevin Cox, Justin Steel, Michael Kreha, and Bobby Fry.

Bar Marco received extensive media coverage when it announced the decision to eliminate tipping and instead pay its employees a $35,000 yearly salary.
