= Strip District, Pittsburgh =

Strip District
- Neighborhood
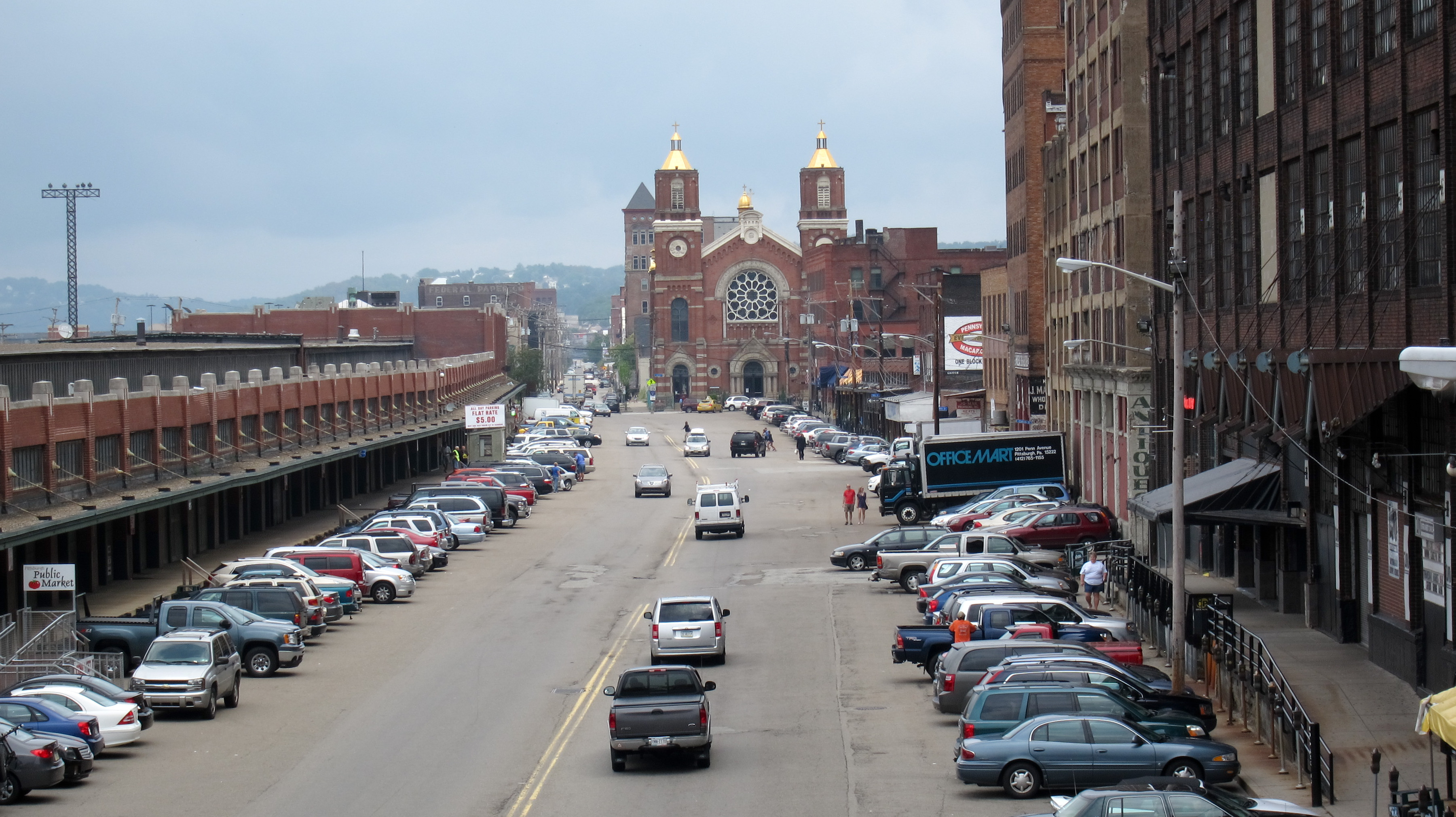
- A view of Smallman Street in 2011

- Coordinates: 40.450°N 79.985°W
- Country: United States
- State: Pennsylvania
- County: Allegheny County
- City: Pittsburgh

Area
  - Total: 0.740 sq mi (1.92 km^{2})
  - Land: 0.614 sq mi (1.59 km^{2})
  - Water: 0.126 sq mi (0.33 km^{2})

Population (2020)
  - Total: 1,845
  - Density: 3,000/sq mi (1,160/km^{2})
- Postal code: 15222

The Strip District is a neighborhood in Pittsburgh, Pennsylvania, United States. It is a one-half square mile area of land northeast of the central business district bordered to the north by the Allegheny River and to the south by portions of the Hill District. The Strip District runs between 11th and 33rd Streets and includes four main thoroughfares—Railroad Street/Waterfront Place, Smallman Street, Penn Avenue, and Liberty Avenue—as well as various side streets.

A warehouse district that was once home to many mills and factories, today the Strip District is a destination for groceries, restaurants, bars, and art. Recently, it has become home to dozens of tech and robotics companies as well as a rapidly growing residential population.

== History ==
In the early 19th century, the Strip District was home to many mills and factories as its location along the Allegheny River made for easy transportation of goods and shipping of raw materials. It was the home of the Fort Pitt Foundry, source of large cannons before and during the American Civil War, including a 20-inch (510 mm) bore Rodman Gun. Early industrial tenants of the Strip District included U.S. Steel, Westinghouse, The Pittsburgh Reduction Company (ALCOA), and later The H.J. Heinz Company, famous ketchup and condiment manufacturer.

The shipping infrastructure built around the manufacturing companies attracted other types of merchants to set up shop in the Strip. By the early 20th century, the Strip District became a vibrant network of wholesalers—mostly fresh produce, meat, and poultry dealers. Soon, auction houses rose around the wholesale warehouses. Many restaurants and grocery stores opened to feed hungry shift workers at any hour of the day. By the 1920s, the Strip District was the economic center of Pittsburgh. During the Great Depression, Old St. Patrick's became a center of social justice activity under the tenure of "labor priest" James Renshaw Cox.

By the mid-to-late 20th century, fewer of the Strip's products were being shipped by rail and boat, causing many produce sellers and wholesalers to leave the area for other space with easier access to highways, or where there was more land available for expansion. In the early 21st century, there are still several wholesalers and produce dealers in the Strip District, but some estimates say more than 80% of the produce industry left the area, preceded by the manufacturing plants and mills in the mid to late 20th century restructuring of industry. Today, many of the abandoned warehouses have been renovated as small specialty shops, restaurants, nightclubs, and bars. The historic St. Stanislaus Kostka Church, an 1891 landmark built in the ornate Polish Cathedral style, lies in the heart of the Strip District and served early generations of Polish immigrants.

== Today ==
Since the late 20th century, the area has developed into a historic market district with many ethnic food purveyors, some art studios, antique dealers, unique boutiques, and other businesses setting up shop where trains once delivered produce by the ton. The lack of weekday activity is in someways compensated by retail and leisure facilities which are used primarily on weekends. Particularly in the summer months, there are open-air farmers' markets, a range of street vendors and facilities to enjoy open air drinks. Residential developers have begun to convert old factory and warehouse buildings into apartments and lofts. Examples include the Armstrong Cork Factory, Brake House Lofts, and the Otto Milk Building. The area is the long-time home of the renowned Pittsburgh Ballet Theatre.

More recently, the area has attracted a number of technology companies and become a hotbed for autonomous vehicle and robotics technology. The area is home to Uber's Advanced Technology Group, which leads the company's vehicular automation efforts, as well Argo AI and Aurora Innovation. Other technology companies with offices in the Strip District include Apple, Facebook, Denso, Robert Bosch GmbH, Target Corporation, Wombat Security, JazzHR, Petuum, and BossaNova Robotics.

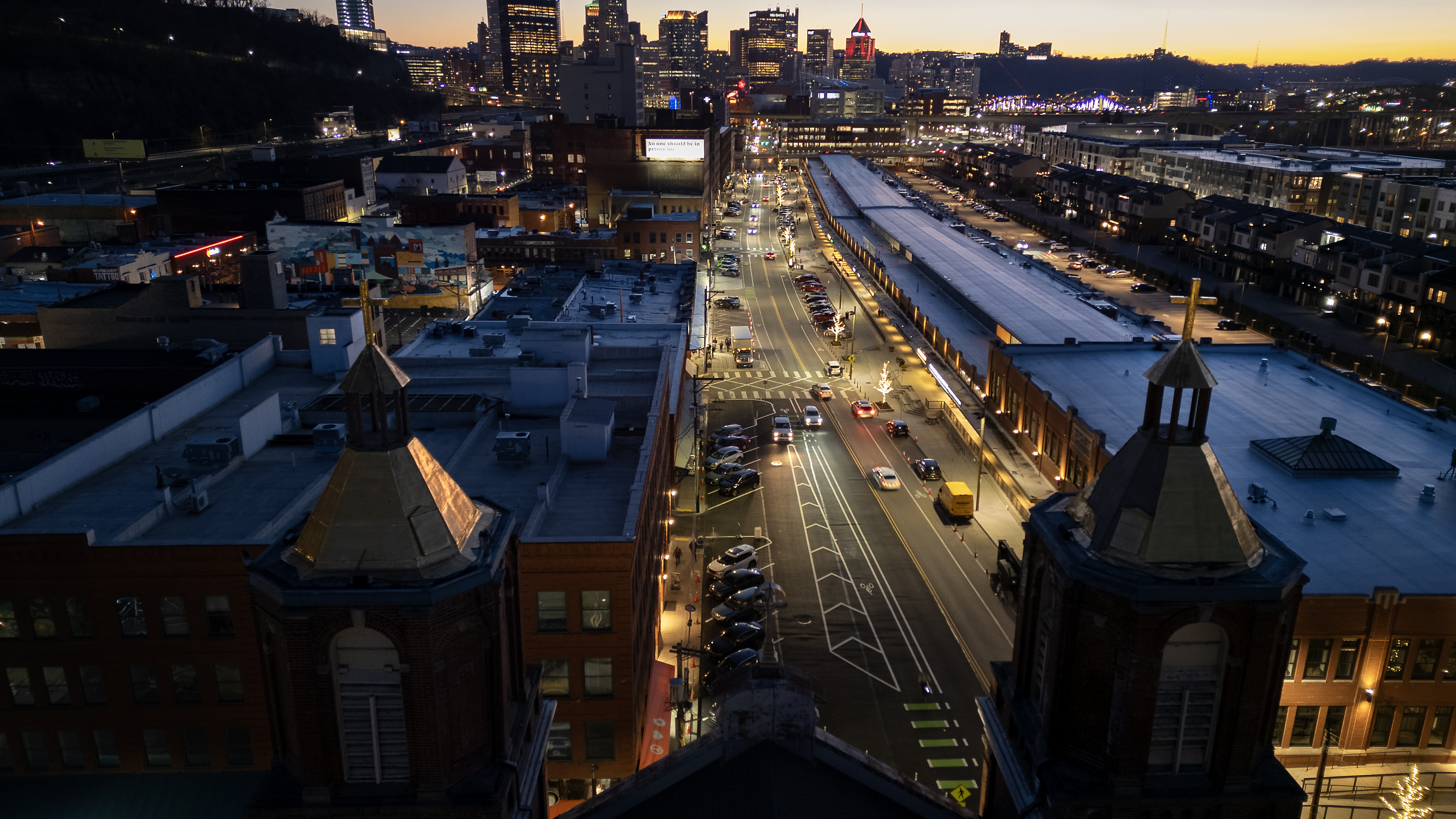
Pittsburgh's Strip District on February 5, 2024. Photo by Steven Adams

In 2026, the bike infrastructure in the Strip District was redone, despite pushback from businesses in the area.The changes added new bike lanes throughout the neighborhood.

== Surrounding and adjacent Pittsburgh neighborhoods ==
The Strip District has five land borders, including Downtown to the southwest, Crawford-Roberts, Bedford Dwellings and Polish Hill to the south, and Lower Lawrenceville to the northeast.

Across the Allegheny River, the Strip runs adjacent with the North Shore and Troy Hill with direct links to both neighborhoods via 16th Street and 31st Street Bridges, respectively.

== Gallery ==
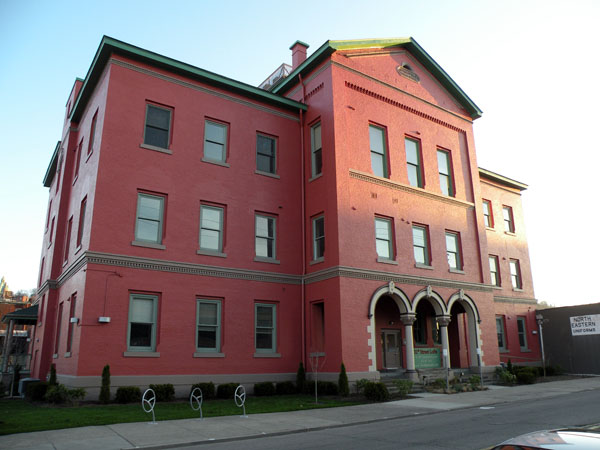
Springfield Public School, built in 1871, now the 31st Street Lofts.

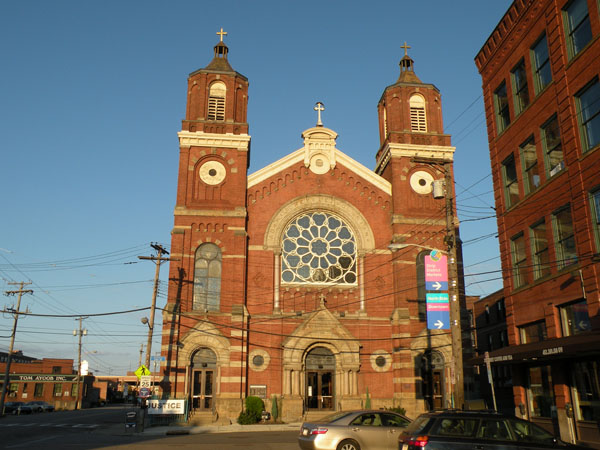
St. Stanislaus Kostka Church, built in 1891.

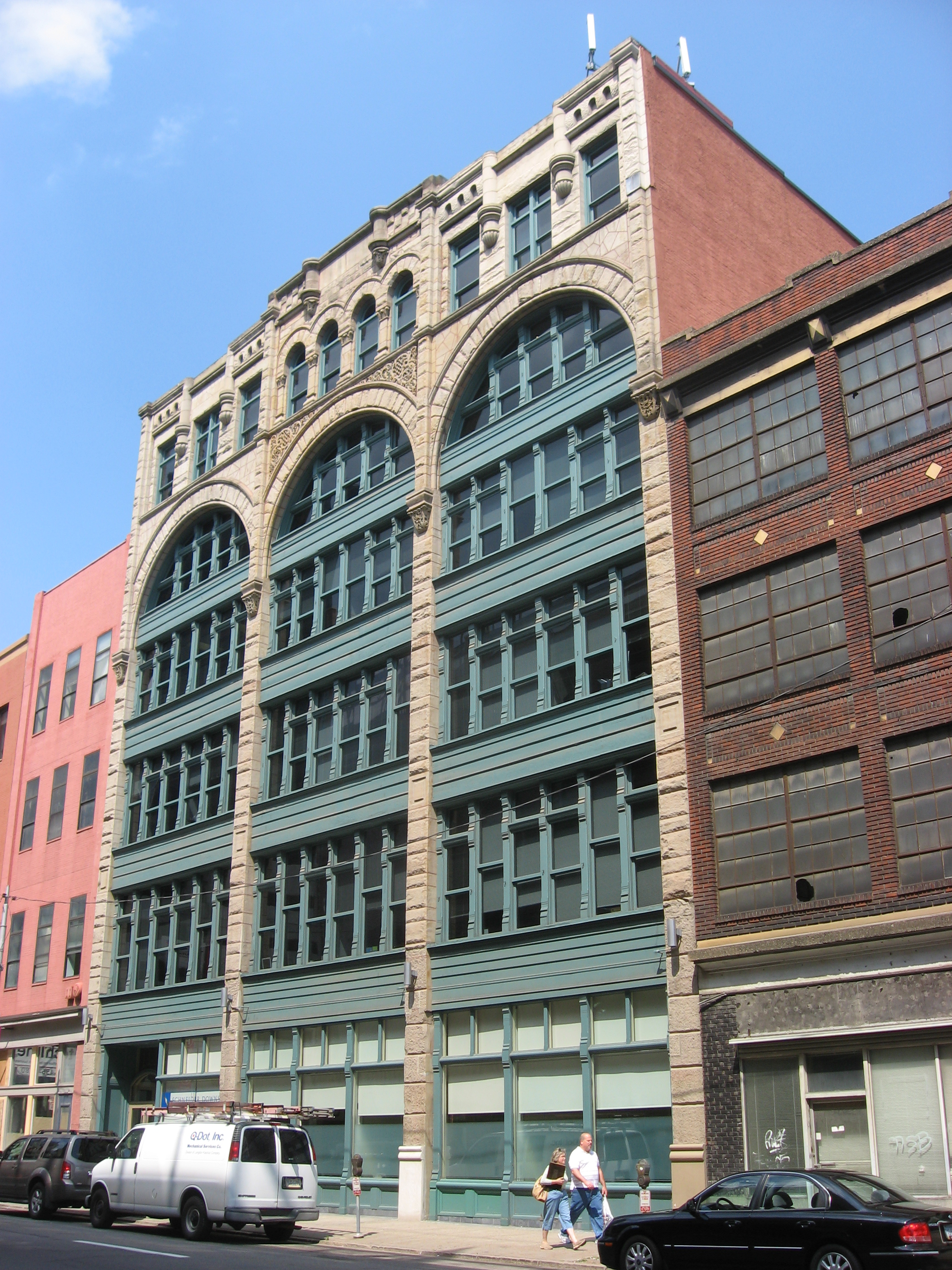
Byrnes & Kiefer Building, built in 1892.

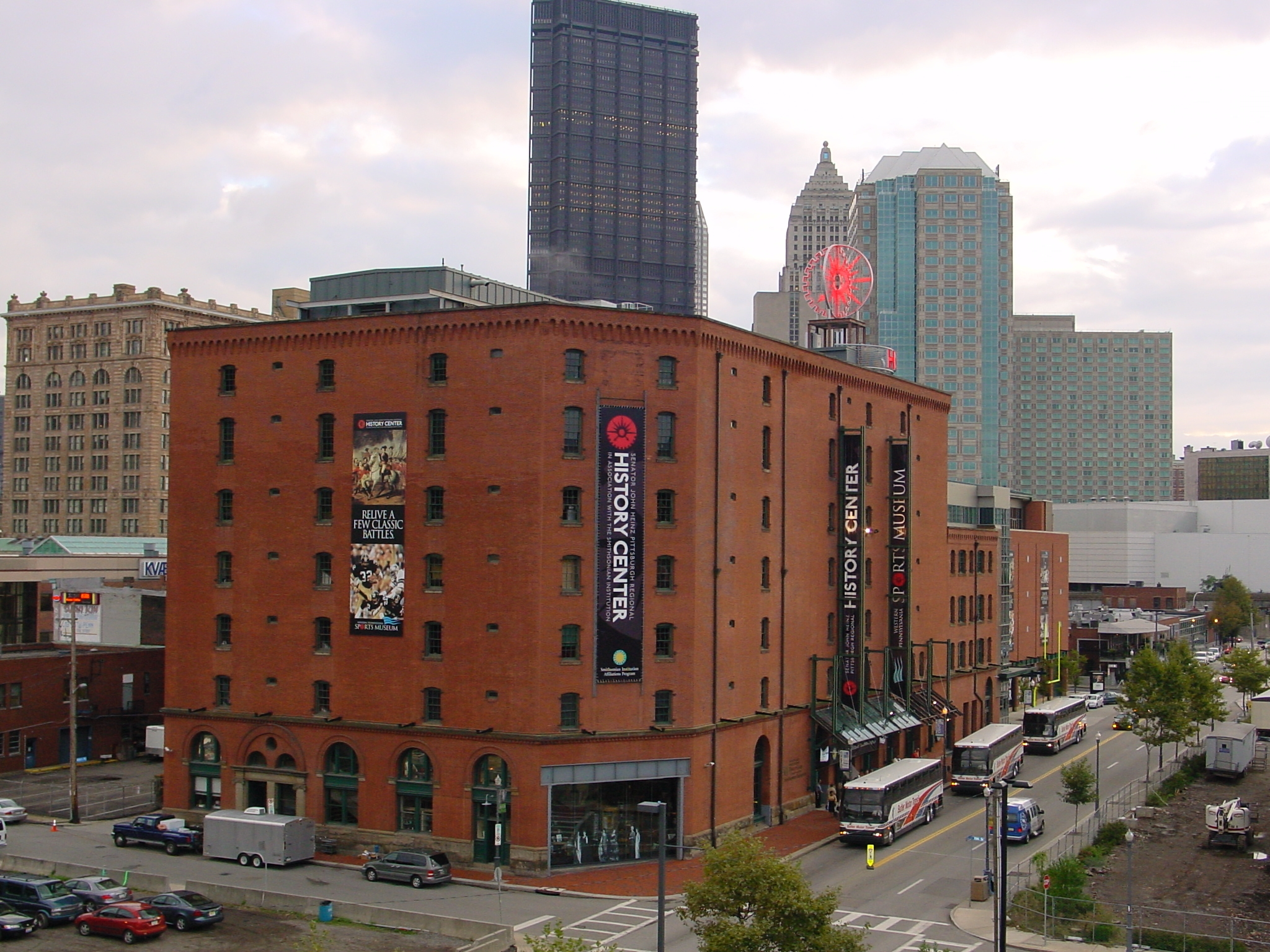
Chautauqua Lake Ice Company Warehouse, built in 1898, now the Heinz History Center.

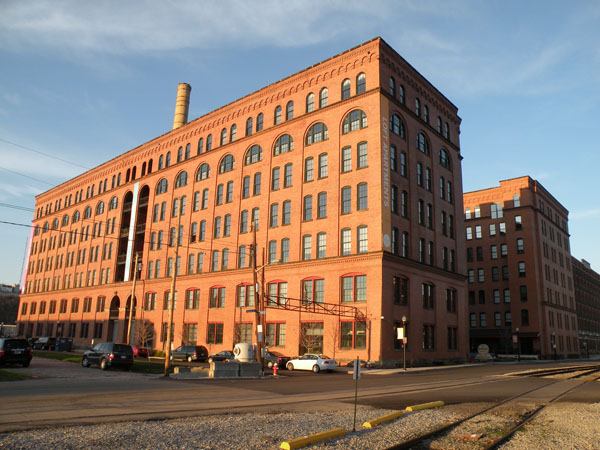
Armstrong Cork Company, built in 1901, now The Cork Factory Lofts.

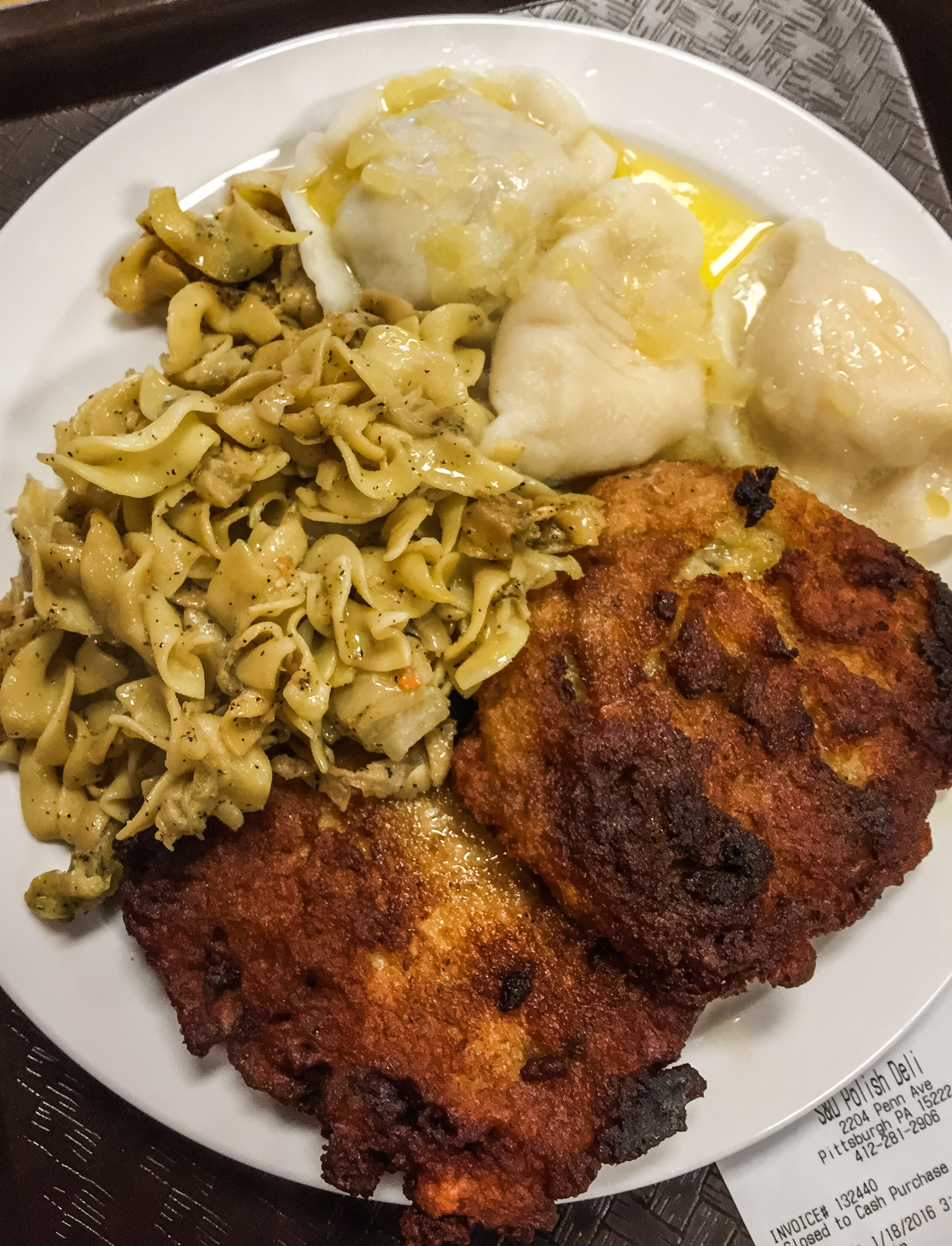
A plate of Polish Food from a deli in the Strip District

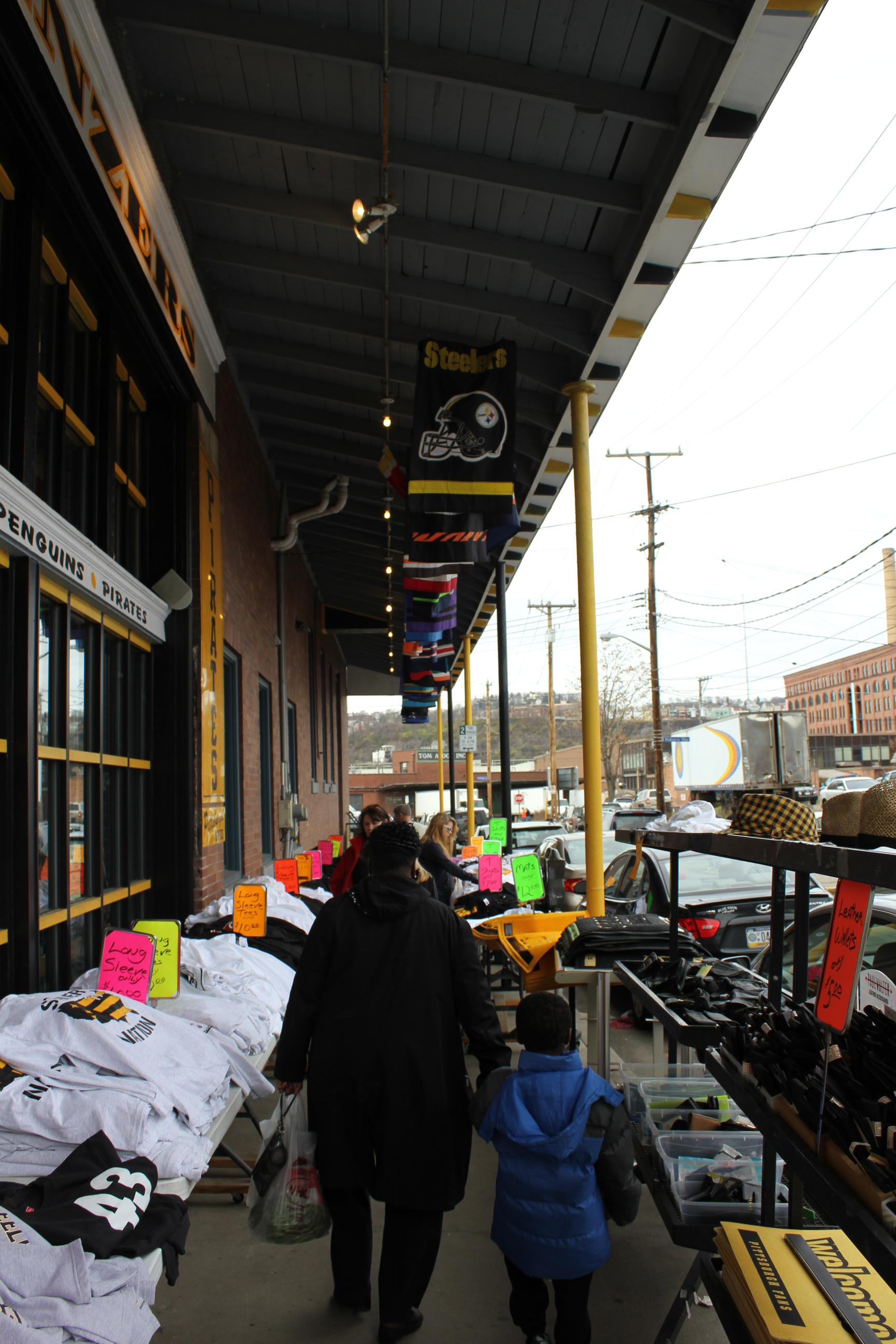
A store selling Pittsburgh sports apparel.

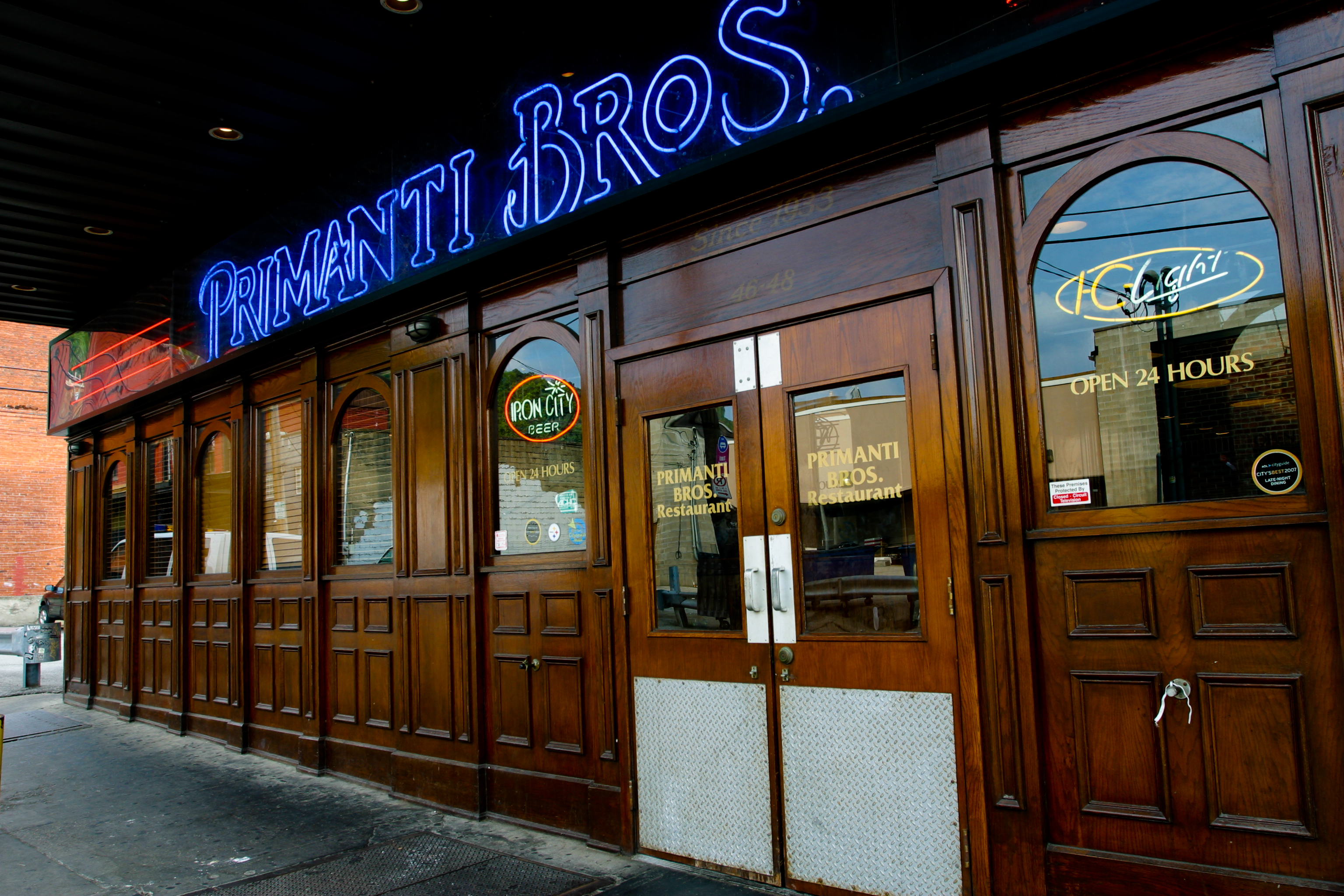
The original Primanti Brothers restaurant in the Strip District.

== See also ==
- Wholey's
- Pittsburgh Public Market
- Enrico Biscotti Company
- Heinz History Center
- Primanti Brothers
- Bar Marco
