= Horace (given name) =

Horace is a masculine given name, derived from the Roman poet Quintus Horatius Flaccus (65–8 BC).

== List of people ==
Notable people with the name include:

- Horace A. Tenney (1820–1906), American politician
- Horace Abbott (1806–1887), American iron manufacturer and banker
- Horace Alexander (1889–1989), English Quaker teacher, writer, pacifist, and ornithologist
- Horace Alexander Young (born 1954), American saxophonist and flute player
- Horace Allen (disambiguation), several people
- Horace Andy (born 1951), Jamaican reggae singer
- Horace Annesley Vachell (1861–1955), English writer
- Horace Archambeault (1857–1918), Canadian politician and judge
- Horace Armitage, English football player and manager between 1908 and 1911
- Horace Arnold (born 1937), American jazz drummer
- Horace Arthur Rose (1867–1933), Indian administrator
- Horace Ashenfelter (1923–2018), American athlete
- Horace Astley (1882–?), English footballer
- Horace Augustus Curtis (1891–1968), English soldier
- Horace Austerberry (1868–1946), English football manager
- Horace Austin (1831–1905), American politician
- Horace Avory (1851–1935), English High Court judge
- Horace Aylwin (1902–1980), Canadian sprinter
- Horace B. Cheney (1868–1938), American administrator and businessman
- Horace B. Griffen (1894–1972), American baseball player, newspaper businessman, and politician
- Horace B. Strait (1835–1894), American politician
- Horace B. Warner (1876–1915), New York assemblyman
- Horace B. Willard (1825–1900), American politician, physician, and businessman
- Horace Bailey (1881–1960), English amateur footballer
- Horace Baker (politician) (1869–1941), American politician
- Horace Baker (footballer) (1910–1974), English footballer
- Horace Baldwin (1801–1850), American mayor
- Horace Baldwin Rice (1861–1929), American businessman and mayor
- Horace Barber (1914–1971), Australian botanist and geneticist
- Horace Barker (1907–2000), American biochemist and microbiologist
- Horace Barks (1895–1983), English mayor
- Horace Barlow (1921–2020), British vision scientist
- Horace Barnes (1891–1961), English footballer
- Horace Barnet (1856–1941), English soldier and footballer
- Horace Barton (1891–1975), South African World War I flying ace
- Horace Bastings (1831–1909), New Zealand politician
- Horace Batchelor (1898–1977), English gambling advertiser
- Horace Bates (1793–1879), English cricketer
- Horace Batten (1912–2014), English shoemaker and bootmaker
- Horace Baugh (1916–2007), Canadian Anglican priest
- Horace Beevor Love (1800–1838), English portrait painter
- Horace Bell (1830–1918), American writer, soldier, and lawyer
- Horace Bell (engineer) (1839–1903), English civil engineer
- Horace Belshaw (1898–1962), New Zealand teacher, economist, and university professor
- Horace Belton (1955–2019), American CFL and NFL player
- Horace-Bénédict de Saussure (1740–1799), Swiss scientist and mountain pioneer
- Horace Berry (1891–1949), Australian politician
- Horace Bigelow (1898–1980), American chess master and organizer
- Horace Biggin (1897–1984), English footballer
- Horace Billings Packer (1851–1940), American politician
- Horace Binney (1780–1875), American politician, lawyer, author, and public speaker
- Horace Binney Sargent (1821–1908), American soldier and politician
- Horace Binney Wallace (1817–1852), American attorney, art and literature critic, and author
- Horace Birks (1897–1985), British soldier
- Horace Bivins (1862–1960), American soldier
- Horace Blew (1878–1957), Welsh international footballer
- Horace Blois Burnham (1824–1894), American Army officer, lawyer, and judge
- Horace Bloomfield (1891–1973), English cricketer
- Horace Boies (1827–1923), American politician
- Horace Bolingbroke Woodward (1848–1914), British geologist
- Horace Bonser (1882–1934), American sport shooter
- Horace Bookwalter Drury (1888–1968), American economist, lecturer, and management author
- Horace Botsford (1877–1948), American football coach
- Horace Bowden (1880–1958), Australian politician
- Horace Bowen (1841–1902), Chief Cashier of the Bank of England from 1893 to 1902
- Horace Bowker (1877–1954), American farm economist and businessman
- Horace Brearley (1913–2007), English cricketer and schoolmaster
- Horace Brigham Claflin (1811–1885), American merchant
- Horace Brindley (1885–1971), English footballer
- Horace Brinsmead (1883–1934), Controller of Aviation in Australia between 1920 and 1933
- Horace Bristol (1908–1997), American photographer
- Horace Bristol Pond (1882–?), American business executive, philanthropist, American Red Cross personnel, World War II prisoner, and an expatriate in the Philippines
- Horace Broadnax (born 1964), American college basketball coach
- Horace Brodzky (1885–1969), Australian-born artist and writer
- Horace Brooks (1814–1894), American soldier
- Horace Brooks Marshall, 1st Baron Marshall of Chipstead (1865–1936), English publisher, newspaper distributor, and Lord Mayor of London, 1918–1919
- Horace Brown (disambiguation), several people
- Horace Bullard (1938–2013), American entrepreneur
- Horace Bumstead (1841–1919), American Congregationalist minister and educator
- Horace Bundy (1814–1883), American portrait painter
- Horace Busby (1924–2000), American opinion journalist, speechwriter, consultant, and public relations expert
- Horace Bushnell (1802–1876), American Congregational minister and theologian
- Horace Butterworth (1868–1939), American college football coach
- Horace Byatt (1875–1933), British colonial governor
- Horace C. Lee (1822–1884), American military officer
- Horace C. Spencer (1832–1926), American politician
- Horace Campbell, American international peace and justice scholar and professor
- Horace Capron (1804–1885), American businessman, agriculturalist, general, foreign advisor- and educator, and expatriate
- Horace Capron Jr. (1840–1864), American soldier
- Horace Carpenter (disambiguation), several people
- Horace Carpentier (1824–1918), American lawyer, mayor, and telegraph company president
- Horace Caulkins (1850–1923), American ceramic artist and engineer
- Horace Champagne (born 1937), Canadian artist
- Horace Chang (born 1952), Jamaican doctor and politician
- Horace Chapin Henry (1844–1928), American businessman, soldier, railroad builder, and banker
- Horace Chapman (disambiguation), several people
- Horace Charles Mules (1856–1939), British civil servant and colonial administrator
- Horace Chase (1810–1886), American politician and pioneer
- Horace Cheung (born 1974), Hong Kong solicitor and politician
- Horace Chevrier (1876–1935), Canadian merchant and political figure
- Horace Chilton (1853–1932), American printer, lawyer, and politician
- Horace Clarence Boyer (1935–2009), American gospel music singer
- Horace Clark (disambiguation), several people
- Horace Clarke (1939–2020), American MLB player
- Horace Cleveland (1814–1900), American landscape architect
- Horace Cohen (born 1971), Dutch actor and comedian
- Horace Cooper Wrinch (1866–1939), English-born physician, Canadian political figure, and Methodist minister
- Horace Craske, male athlete who competed for England at the 1934 British Empire Games
- Horace Crawfurd (1881–1958), British politician
- Horace Crotty (1886–1952), Anglican bishop in Australia and England
- Horace Cumner (1918–1999), Welsh international footballer
- Horace Cutler (1912–1997), British politician
- Horace Daggett (1931–1998), American farmer and politician
- Horace Dall (1901–1986), British amateur astronomer and telescope maker
- Horace Dalley (born 1950), Jamaican educator and politician
- Horace Dammers (1921–2004), English Anglican dean and author
- Horace Darwin (1851–1928), English engineer
- Horace Davenport (1850–1925), English swimmer
- Horace Davey, Baron Davey (1833–1907), English judge and politician
- Horace Davies (1903–1971), Australian politician
- Horace Davis (1831–1916), American politician
- Horace Dawkins (1867–1944), British politician
- Horace Dawson (born 1926), American diplomat
- Horace Dawswell (1896–1966), British gymnast
- Horace Day (1909–1984), American painter
- Horace Dean (1814–1887), American-born Australian doctor, journalist, and political candidate
- Horace Debenham (1903–1993), British rower
- Horace Dediu (born 1968), Romanian-American industry analyst
- Horace Deighton (1831–?), Trinidadian cricketer
- Horace DeVauhan (died 1927), American criminal
- Horace de Vere Cole (1881–1936), British prankster
- Horace de Viel-Castel (1802–1864), French art-lover, collector, and museum director
- Horace Dimick (1809?–1874), American gunsmith and firearms dealer
- Horace Disston (1906–1982), American field hockey player
- Horace Dixon (1899–1978), New Zealand rugby league player
- Horace Dixon (bishop) (1869–1964), British priest in the Church of England
- Horace Dobbins (1868–1962), American businessman and politician
- Horace Dobbs (1933–2020), British scientist, researcher, author, and television producer
- Horace Dobell (1828–1917), English doctor and medical writer
- Horace Dodge (1868–1920), American car manufacturer
- Horace Donisthorpe (1870–1951), British entomologist
- Horace Dove-Edwin (born 1967), Sierra Leonean sprinter
- Horace Duckett (1867–1939), English rugby union and professional rugby league footballer
- Horace Dutton Taft (1861–1943), American educator
- Horace Dyer (1873–1928), American football player and attorney
- Horace E. Bemis (1868–1914), American college football player and lumber dealer
- Horace E. Deemer (1858–1917), American state court judge
- Horace Eaton (1804–1855), American politician and medical doctor
- Horace Edmonds (1908–1975), Australian rules footballer
- Horace Edward Manners Fildes (1875–1937), New Zealand postmaster, book collector, and bibliographer
- Horace Edward Ramsden (1878–1948), English military emigrant to South Africa
- Horace Elgin Dodge (1868–1920), American automobile manufacturing pioneer
- Horace Ellis (1843–1867), American soldier
- Horace Ellis Crouch (1918–2005), American military aviator
- Horace Elmo Nichols (1912–2000), American lawyer, jurist, and judge
- Horace Engdahl (born 1948), Swedish literary critic
- Horace Evans, 1st Baron Evans (1903–1963), Welsh general physician
- Horace Everett (1779–1851), American politician
- Horace Everett Hooper (1859–1922), American editor and publisher
- Horace Ezra Bixby (1826–1912), American steamboat pilot, steamboat captain, and inventor
- Horace F. Bartine (1848–1918), American politician
- Horace F. Clark (1815–1873), American railroad executive and politician
- Horace F. Graham (1862–1941), American politician
- Horace F. Page (1833–1890), American politician
- Horace Fairbanks (1820–1888), American politician
- Horace Fairhurst (1893–1921), English professional footballer
- Horace Faith, Jamaican reggae singer
- Horace Farquhar, 1st Earl Farquhar (1844–1923), British financier, courtier, and politician
- Horace Field (1861–1948), English architect
- Horace Field Parshall (1865–1932), American-born British electrical engineer
- Horace Fielding (1906–1969), English professional footballer
- Horace Finaly (1871–1945), French financier, banker, and art collector
- Horace Finch (1906–1980), English pianist and organist
- Horace Fisher (1903–1974), English cricketer
- Horace Fisher (painter) (1861–1928), British painter
- Horace Fleming, Irish man who was the Dean of Cloyne from 1884 to 1909
- Horace Fletcher (1849–1919), American dietitian
- Horace Fletcher (footballer) (1876–1931), English footballer
- Horace Fogel (1861–1928), MLB manager
- Horace Foley (1900–1989), Australian medical practitioner and mayor
- Horace Forbes, 19th Lord Forbes (1829–1914), Scottish peer
- Horace Ford (disambiguation), several people
- Horace Francis (1821–1894), British architect
- Horace Howard Furness (1833–1912), American Shakepearean scholar
- Horace Francis Barnes (1902–1960), English entomologist
- Horace François Bastien Sébastiani de La Porta (1771–1851), French general, diplomat, and politician
- Horace Freeland Judson (1931–2011), American historian of molecular biology
- Horace G. Hutchins (1811–1877), American politician
- Horace G. Knowles (1863–1937), American attorney and diplomat
- Horace G. Snover (1847–1924), American politician and judge
- Horace G. Wadlin (1851–1925), American statistician, economist, librarian, and architect
- Horace Gager (1917–1984), English professional footballer
- Horace Garner (1923–1995), American baseball player
- Horace Gaul (1883–1939), Canadian professional ice hockey- and lacrosse player
- Horace Geoffrey Quaritch Wales (1900–1981), historian educated in England
- Horace Gifford (1932–1992), American beach house architect
- Horace Gillom (1921–1985), American football player
- Horace Ginsbern (1902–1987), American architect
- Horace Glover (1883–1967), English professional footballer
- Horace Goldin (1873–1939), Russian stage magician
- Horace Gould (1921–1968), British racing driver
- Horace Grangel (1908–1970), Australian cricketer
- Horace Grant (born 1965), American basketball player
- Horace Grant Underwood (1859–1916), English missionary
- Horace Gray (1828–1902), American judge
- Horace Gray (cricketer) (1874–1938), English cricketer, educator, and clergyman
- Horace Greasley (1918–2010), British soldier
- Horace Greeley (1811–1872), American newspaper editor and publisher
- Horace Greeley Knapp, American architect
- Horace Greely Prettyman (1857–1945), American football player
- Horace Green (1918–2000), English professional footballer
- Horace Gregory (1898–1982), American poet, translator, literary critic, and college professor
- Horace Griffin, American Episcopal minister
- Horace Griggs Prall (1881–1951), American attorney and politician
- Horace Grocott (1880–1963), New Zealand Baptist missionary, Boys’ Brigade leader, and postmaster
- Horace Günzburg (1833–1909), Russian philanthropist
- Horace Gwynne (1912–2001), Canadian bantamweight professional boxer
- Horace H. Cummings (1858–1937), American educator and Mormon leader
- Horace H. Fuller (1886–1966), American soldier
- Horace H. Smith (1905–1976), American diplomat
- Horace Hagedorn (1915–2005), American advertising executive, businessman, and philanthropist
- Horace Hahn (1915–2003), American actor
- Horace Hall, English businessman
- Horace Hall Edwards (1902–1987), American politician
- Horace Hamilton (1880–1971), British civil servant
- Horace Hardwick (1935–2020), American politician
- Horace Harmon Lurton (1844–1914), American Supreme Court Justice and Circuit Judge
- Horace Harned (1920–2017), American politician
- Horace Harper (1898–1970), Australian politician
- Horace Harral (1817–1905), British wood-engraver, etcher, and photographer
- Horace Harrison (1829–1885), American politician
- Horace Hart (1840–1916), English printer and biographer
- Horace Hart (footballer) (1894–1975), English footballer
- Horace Harvey (1863–1949), Canadian lawyer, jurist, and a Chief Justice
- Horace Harvey (bowls), South African international lawn bowler
- Horace Haszard (1853–1922), Canadian wholesale merchant and political figure
- Horace Hawkins (musician) (1880–1966), English classical organist
- Horace Hazell (1909–1990), English cricketer
- Horace Hearne (1892–1962), English barrister and judge
- Horace Heidt (1901–1986), American bandleader
- Horace Helmbold (1867–1939), American MLB player
- Horace Henderson (1904–1988), American jazz pianist, organist, arranger, and bandleader
- Horace Hendrickson (1910–2004), American football-, basketball-, and baseball player, coach, and athletics administrator
- Horace Henry Baxter (1818–1884), American businessman
- Horace Henry Glasock (1880–1916), English-born South African soldier
- Horace Henry White (1864–1946), American lawyer and civic leader
- Horace Henshall (1889–1951), English footballer and manager
- Horace Herring (1884–1962), English mechanical engineer, draughtsman, and emigrant politician to New Zealand
- Horace Hildreth (1902–1988), American lawyer and politician
- Horace Hiller (1844–1898), American businessman
- Horace His de la Salle (1795–1878), French art collector
- Horace Hodes (1907–1989), American pediatrician and disease researcher
- Horace Hodges (1863–1951), British stage- and film actor and writer
- Horace Hogan (born 1965), American professional wrestler
- Horace Hogben (1888–1975), Australian politician
- Horace Holden (born 1963), American slalom canoer
- Horace Holley (disambiguation), several people
- Horace Holmes (1888–1971), British politician and trade union official
- Horace Hood (1870–1916), British admiral
- Horace Hooker (1793–1864), American Congregationalist minister and author
- Horace Horton (1823–1902), Canadian insurance agent and political figure
- Horace Howard Furness (1833–1912), American Shakespearean scholar
- Horace Hunt (1907–1984), Australian cricketer
- Horace Huntley, American professor, historian and writer
- Horace Husler (1890–1959), English professional footballer
- Horace Hutchinson (1859–1932), English golfer
- Horace Ivory (born 1954), American football player
- Horace Jackson (1898–1952), American filmmaker, screenwriter, and set designer
- Horace Jackson (filmmaker) (fl.1963–1976), American filmmaker, and educator
- Horace Jacobs (1816–1884), American doctor
- Horace Jacobs Rice (1882–1964), American attorney, legal instructor, and academic dean
- Horace James (disambiguation), several people
- Horace James Seymour (1885–1978), British diplomat
- Horace Jansen Beemer (c. 1845–1912), American railway contractor and businessman in Canada
- Horace Jarnigan (1909–1977), American baseball player
- Horace Jayne (1859–1913), American zoologist and educator
- Horace Jenkins (born 1974), American former NBA player
- Horace Jenkins (baseball) (1891–1962), American baseball player
- Horace Jones (disambiguation), several people
- Horace Joules (1902–1977), British physician, health administrator, and health campaigner
- Horace Judson (disambiguation), several people
- Horace K. Hathaway (1878–1944), American consulting engineer and lecturer
- Horace Kadoorie (1902–1995), industrialist, hotelier, and philanthropist in Shanghai and Hong Kong
- Horace Kallen (1882–1974), German-born American philosopher
- Horace Keats (1895–1945), English-born Australian composer, arranger, piano accompanist, and conductor
- Horace Kelley (1819–1890), American industrialist and philanthropist
- Horace Kenton Wright (1915–1976), American-born Bahamian artist and teacher
- Horace Kephart (1862–1931), American travel writer and librarian
- Horace King (disambiguation), several people
- Horace Knight (fl. 1901–1920), British natural history illustrator
- Horace Kolimba (1939–1997), Tanzanian politician
- Horace L. Friess (1900–1975), American ethicist
- Horace L. McBride (1894–1962), American Army officer
- Horace LaBissoniere (1896–1972), American football player and politician
- Horace Lamb (1849–1934), British mathematician
- Horace Lambart, 11th Earl of Cavan (1878–1950), Anglo-Irish soldier and Anglican priest
- Horace Law (1911–2005), British military officer
- Horace Lawson Hunley (1823–1863), American marine engineer
- Horace Lecoq de Boisbaudran (1802–1897), French artist and teacher
- Horace Lee (1909–1981), English cricketer
- Horace Lindrum (1912–1974), Australian professional snooker- and billiards player
- Horace Liveright (1884–1933), American publisher and stage producer
- Horace Lloyd (1828–1874), English barrister
- Horace Lockett (born 2004), American football player
- Horace Locklear (1942–2024), American politician and former attorney
- Horace Logan (1916–2002), American radio personality
- Horace Loh (born 1937), Chinese-born Taiwanese biochemist
- Horace Lucian Arnold (1837–1915), American engineer, inventor, engineering journalist, and writer
- Horace Lunt (1918–2010), American linguist and professor
- Horace Lyddon (1912–1968), English Navy officer and college president
- Horace Lyman (1815–1887), American reverend and math professor
- Horace Lyne (1860–1949), Welsh international rugby player
- Horace M. Albright (1890–1987), American conservationist
- Horace M. Singer (1823–1896), American businessman and politician
- Horace M. Stone (1890–1944), New York politician
- Horace M. Thorne (1918–1944), American Army soldier
- Horace Mackennal (died 1949), Australian architect
- Horace Mann (1796–1859), American politician and education reformer
- Horace Mann Bond (1904–1972), American historian, college administrator, and social science researcher
- Horace Mann Jr. (1844–1868), American botanist
- Horace Mann Thu-Jaune (born 1963), Malagasy politician
- Horace Mann Towner (1855–1937), American politician
- Horace Marryat (1818–1887), English traveler and author
- Horace Martelli (1877–1959), British Army officer
- Horace Martin (born 1985), Jamaican-Dutch kickboxer
- Horace Martineau (1874–1916), British soldier
- Horace Mayhew (1845–1926), British mining engineer and colliery owner
- Horace Mayhew (journalist) (1816–1872), English journalist and humorist
- Horace Maynard (1814–1882), American educator, attorney, politician, and diplomat
- Horace McCoy (1897–1955), American writer
- Horace McKenna (1899–1982), American Catholic activist and social worker
- Horace McKinney (1919–1997), American professional basketball player and coach
- Horace McMahon (1906–1971), American actor
- Horace Meek Hickam (1885–1934), American pioneer airpower advocate and Army officer
- Horace Mellard DuBose (1858–1941), American Methodist Episcopal bishop
- Horace Mellor (1851–1942), English cricketer
- Horace Merrick (1887–1961), English cricketer, soldier, and school teacher
- Horace Merrill (1884–1958), Canadian professional ice hockey player
- Horace Micallef (born 1959), Maltese sports shooter
- Horace Milan (1894–1955), American MLB player
- Horace Miller (disambiguation), several people
- Horace Mills (1864–1941), British singer, actor, and dramatist
- Horace Mitchell (1858–1951), English cricketer
- Horace Mitchell Miner (1912–1993), American anthropologist
- Horace Moore (disambiguation), several people
- Horace Moore-Jones (1868–1922), New Zealand artist, soldier, and art teacher
- Horace Moulden (1898–1988), British trade union leader
- Horace Moule Evans (1841–1923), Indian Army officer
- Horace Murphy (1880–1975), American film actor
- Horace Nelson (1878–1962), American politician
- Horace Newcomb, American television critic, writer, and mass media scholar
- Horace Newte (1870–1949), English playwright, novelist, and columnist
- Horace Newton (1844–1920), British Anglican priest, philanthropist, and country landowner
- Horace Nicholls (1867–1941), English photographer
- Horace Nobbs (1880–?), British trade unionist and political activist
- Horace Nock (1879–1958), Australian politician, farmer, and company director
- Horace Northcutt (1883–1950), American politician
- Horace Norton (1896–1976), English professional footballer
- Horace Notice (born 1957), English plasterer and boxer
- Horace Nunn (1891–1957), New Zealand rugby footballer
- Horace Odell (1910–1984), American javelin thrower
- Horace Ott (born 1933), American jazz and R&B composer, arranger, record producer, conductor, and pianist
- Horace Ové (1936–2023), British filmmaker
- Horace Owens (born 1961), American basketball coach, player, and assistant coach
- Horace P. Biddle (1811–1900), American lawyer, judge, poet, musicologist, and hermit
- Horace Packe (1865–1934), New Zealand Archdeacon
- Horace Panter (born 1953), English bassist for The Specials
- Horace Parlan (1931–2017), American pianist and composer
- Horace Parmelee (1889–1957), American talent manager and concert promoter
- Horace Parnell Tuttle (1837–1923), American astronomer and army and navy officer
- Horace Patch (1814–1862), American politician
- Horace Pauleus Sannon (1870–1938), Haitian historian, politician, and diplomat
- Horace Peacock (1869–1940), English cricketer and British Army officer
- Horace Pearson (1907–?), English footballer
- Horace Percy Lale (1886–1955), British Air Force officer
- Horace Perkins (born 1954), American football player
- Horace Perry (1905–1962), English cricketer
- Horace Petty (1904–1982), Australian politician
- Horace Phillips (disambiguation), several people
- Horace Pike (1869–1936), English footballer
- Horace Pippin (1888–1946), American painter
- Horace Pittaway (born 1941), South African cricketer
- Horace Pitt-Rivers, 3rd Baron Rivers (1777–1831), British nobleman and gambler
- Horace Pitt-Rivers, 6th Baron Rivers (1814–1880), British peer and army officer
- Horace Plunkett (1854–1932), Anglo-Irish agricultural reformer, author, and politician
- Horace Poolaw (1906–1984), American-born Kiowa photographer
- Horace Porter (1837–1921), American soldier and diplomat
- Horace Poussard (1829–1898), French violinist and composer
- Horace Price (1863–1941), English Anglican missionary
- Horace Prince (1900–1977), New Zealand cricketer
- Horace Pym (1844–1896), English confidential solicitor, book collector, and journal editor
- Horace R. Buck (1853–1897), American Supreme Court Justice
- Horace R. Byers (1906–1998), American meteorologist
- Horace R. Cayton, Sr. (1859–1940), African-American newspaper publisher
- Horace R. Cayton, Jr. (1903–1970), American sociologist, son of the above
- Horace R. Kornegay (1924–2009), American politician
- Horace Racine (1905–1994), Canadian politician
- Horace Rackham (1858–1933), American lawyer, stockholder, and philanthropist
- Horace Ramey (1885–1974), American athlete
- Horace Randal (1833–1864), American soldier
- Horace Rawlins (1874–1935), English professional golfer
- Horace Reid (cricketer) (born 1935), Jamaican cricketer
- Horace Rendall Mansfield (1863–1914), British politician
- Horace Ricardo (1850–1935), British military officer and land owner
- Horace Rice (1872–1950), Australian tennis player
- Horace Richardson (1854–1935), Australian politician
- Horace Richardson (American football) (born 1993), American football player
- Horace Rickett (1912–1989), English professional football goalkeeper
- Horace Ridler (1892–1969), English professional freak and sideshow performer
- Horace Robertson (1894–1960), Australian military officer
- Horace Roome (1887–1964), British military officer
- Horace Rowan Gaither (1909–1961), American attorney, investment banker, and administrator
- Horace Roye (1906–2002), British photographer
- Horace Rublee (1829–1896), American journalist, newspaper editor, politician, and ambassador to Switzerland
- Horace Rudston (1878–1962), English cricketer
- Horace Rumbold (disambiguation), several people
- Horace S. Carswell Jr. (1916–1944), American Army major
- Horace S. Eldredge (1816–1888), American Mormon leader
- Horace Sandford (1891–1967), Australian cricketer
- Horace Scudder (1838–1902), American writer and editor
- Horace Searle Anderson (1833–1907), British Indian Army officer
- Horace Secrist (1881–1943), American statistician and economist
- Horace Sedger (1853–1917), American-born British theatre manager and impresario
- Horace See (1835–1909), American mechanical engineer, marine engineer, naval architect, inventor, and superintendent
- Horace Seely-Brown Jr. (1908–1982), American politician
- Horace Sewell (1881–1953), British Army officer
- Horace Seymour (1791–1851), English Army officer and politician
- Horace Sheffield III (born 1954), American pastor and media personality
- Horace Sheldon, British composer, orchestra leader, and stage- and musical director
- Horace Sherrell (1886–1940), American college football player and coach
- Horace Sholl (1851–1927), Australian pastoralist and politician
- Horace Signor Brannon (1884–1970), American physician
- Horace Silliman (1825–1910), American businessman, philanthropist, and a layman in the Presbyterian Church
- Horace Silver (1928–2014), American jazz musician, composer, and arranger
- Horace Smirk (1902–1991), New Zealand medicine professor
- Horace Smith (disambiguation), several people
- Horace Smith-Dorrien (1858–1930), British general
- Horace Smithy (1914–1948), American cardiac surgeon
- Horace Snary (1897–1966), English cricketer
- Horace Speed (1852–1924), American pioneer and attorney
- Horace Speed (baseball) (1951–2025), American MLB outfielder
- Horace Sprott (1899–c.1992), American songster and harmonica player
- Horace Stanley Colliver (1874–1957), Canadian businessman and political figure
- Horace Stansel (1888–1936), American civil engineer and politician
- Horace Stansfield Collier (1864–1930), British surgeon
- Horace Stern (1878–1969), American Supreme Court Justice
- Horace Stevens (1876–1950), Australian singer, Army officer, singing teacher, and sculler
- Horace Stoneham (1903–1990), American MLB executive
- Horace Stoute (born 1971), Barbadian international footballer
- Horace Strutt (1903–1985), Australian Army officer and politician
- Horace Sumner Lyman (1855–1904), American journalist, historian, and educator
- Horace Sweeney Oakley (1861–1929), American lawyer, scholar, and philanthropist
- Horace T. Cahill (1894–1976), American politician
- Horace Tabor (1830–1899), American prospector, businessman, and politician
- Horace Tapscott (1934–1999), American jazz pianist and composer
- Horace Tate (1922–2002), American educator, activist, scholar, and politician
- Horace Taylor (disambiguation), several people
- Horace Tennyson O'Rourke (1880–1963), Irish architect
- Horace Terhune Herrick (1887–1948), American scientist and agriculture director
- Horace Thomas (1890–1916), Welsh international rugby union and Army personnel
- Horace Thompson (1900–?), English footballer
- Horace Tonks (1891–1959), British Anglican colonial bishop
- Horace Tozer (1844–1916), Australian lawyer and politician
- Horace Tracy Pitkin (1869–1900), American missionary
- Horace Traubel (1858–1919), American essayist, poet, magazine publisher, author, and Georgist
- Horace Trevor-Cox (1908–2005), British farmer, landowner, and politician
- Horace Trubridge (born 1957), English trade union leader and musician
- Horace Trumbauer (1868–1938), American architect
- Horace Tuck (1876–1951), English artist
- Horace Tuitt (born 1954), Trinidad and Tobago sprinter
- Horace Tulloch (born 1930), Jamaican cricketer
- Horace Twiss (1787–1849), English writer and politician
- Horace Valentin Crocicchia (1888–1976), French colonial governor and administrator
- Horace Venn (1892–1953), English cricketer
- Horace Vere, 1st Baron Vere of Tilbury (1565–1635), English military leader
- Horace Vernet (1789–1863), French painter
- Horace Viner (1877–1935), Welsh professional footballer
- Horace W. Babcock (1912–2003), American astronomer
- Horace W. Bailey (1852–1914), American politician and government official
- Horace W. Bozarth (1894–1976), American politician
- Horace W. B. Donegan (1900–1991), American Episcopal Church bishop
- Horace W. South (1877–1954), American football coach and educator
- Horace W. Wilkie (1917–1976), American attorney, judge, and politician
- Horace Walker (1838–1908), English mountaineer
- Horace Walker (basketball) (1937–2001), American NBA player
- Horace Wallbanks (1918–2004), English professional footballer
- Horace Waller (disambiguation), several people
- Horace Walls III (born 2001), American rapper
- Horace Walpole (1717–1797), English writer, art historian, man of letters, antiquarian, and politician
- Horace Walrond (born 1971), Barbadian cricketer
- Horace Walter Gilbert (1855–1928), English landscape painter
- Horace Walter Rigden (1898–1986), English chemist and oil industry executive
- Horace Ward (1927–2016), American lawyer and judge
- Horace Waring (1910–1980), English/Australian zoologist
- Horace Wass (1903–1969), English sportsman
- Horace Waters (1812–1893), American Christian hymnwriter and music publisher
- Horace Watts (1901–1959), Canadian Anglican bishop
- Horace Webster (1794–1871), American educator
- Horace Weldon Gilmore (1918–2010), American judge
- Horace Wells (1815–1848), American dentist
- Horace Weston (1825–1890), American musician and composer
- Horace Wheaton (1803–1882), American businessman and politician
- Horace Wheddon (1891–1959), British cinematographer
- Horace Whiddon (1879–1955), Australian politician
- Horace White (1865–1943), American lawyer and politician
- Horace White (writer) (1834–1916), American journalist and financial expert
- Horace Whiteside (1891–1956), American football player and football and basketball coach
- Horace Wigan (1815/16–1885), English actor, dramatist, and theatre manager
- Horace Wilder (1802–1889), American politician, lawyer, and judge
- Horace William Finlinson (1871–1956), English rugby international
- Horace William Petherick (1839–1919), British artist, illustrator, musician, writer, and violin expert
- Horace William Wheelwright (1815–1865), English hunter, naturalist, and writer
- Horace Williams (1900–1960), Welsh professional footballer
- Horace Williams (cricketer) (1932–2011), Grenadian cricketer
- Horace Williams Fuller (1844–1901), American lawyer and editor
- Horace Wilson (disambiguation), several people
- Horace Winchell Magoun (1907–1991), American neuroscientist
- Horace Wolcott Robbins (1842–1904), American painter
- Horace Woodard (1904–1973), American film producer and cinematographer
- Horace Worth Vaughan (1867–1922), American lawyer, jurist, and politician
- Horace Yomishi Mochizuki (1937–1989), American mathematician
- Horace Young (disambiguation), several people

== Fictional characters ==
- Horace, in the animated television show Family Guy
- Horace, an 1840 novel by George Sand
- Horace (play), a 1640 play by Pierre Corneille
- Horace (television play), a 1972 television play
- Horace series, a 1980s video game series
- Horace Goodspeed, in the television series Lost
- Horace Horsecollar, a Disney character
- Horace Rumpole, the eponymous character in the television series Rumpole of the Bailey
- Horace Slughorn, in the Harry Potter series by J. K. Rowling
- Horace Wittel VIII, in Horace and Pete, a 2016 web series created by Louis C.K. (with C.K. starring as Horace)

== See also ==
- Horatio
- Horatius (disambiguation)
- Horus (disambiguation)
- Horrie
