= Horace (disambiguation) =

Horace (65–8 BC) was a Roman poet.

Horace may also refer to:

- Horace (given name)

== Places ==
- Horace, Indiana
- Horace, Kansas
- Horace, Nebraska
- Horace, North Dakota
- Horace (crater), a crater on Mercury

== Other uses ==
- Horace (play), a 1640 play by Pierre Corneille
- Horace (television play), 1972 British play by Roy Minton
- Horace (video game), a video game developed by Paul Helman and published by 505 Games
- Horace (video game series), a 1980s video game series
- Horace, an 1840 novel by George Sand
- Horace, one of the three main characters in the American animated television series The Problem Solverz

== See also ==
- Horatio (disambiguation)
- Horus (disambiguation)
