= Belshaw (surname) =

Belshaw is a surname of French origin.

== Origins and variants ==
One theory suggests that the surname, which made its first recorded appearance in the 13th Century, is French in origin and related to the nickname meaning cheerful, or good looking, derived from the Old French beu and bel, meaning fair and lovely and chere, meaning face.

Variants of the surname include "Belsher", "Beuscher", "Beaushaw", "Bewshire", "Bewshaw", "Bewshea", "Beushaw" and "Bowsher".

== People with the surname ==
- Annika Belshaw (born 2002), American ski jumper
- Billy Belshaw, English rugby league footballer of the 1930s and 1940s
- Cyril Belshaw (1921–2018), New Zealand-born anthropologist
- Erik Belshaw (born 2004), American ski jumper
- Horace Belshaw (1898–1962), New Zealand teacher, economist and professor
- Les Belshaw, English rugby league footballer
- Scott Belshaw (born 1985), Northern Ireland professional boxer
