= Cliff Dwellers Club =

Civic arts organization in Chicago, Illinois, US

The Cliff Dwellers
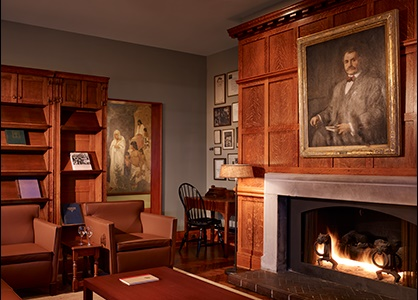
- Photo of Cliff Dwellers fireplace and lounge area with portrait of Hamlin Garland, first president of the Club
- Established: 1907 (current location since 1996)
- Location: 200 S Michigan Ave, Suite 2200, Chicago, Illinois 60604; United States
- Website: cliff-chicago.org

The Cliff Dwellers Club is a private civic arts organization in Chicago, Illinois. The Club was founded in 1907 by Chicago author Hamlin Garland as "The Attic Club", On January 18, 1909, the name was formally changed to The Cliff Dwellers. In 1908, Cliff Dwellers entered into a lease for the eighth floor and the ninth-story penthouse above Orchestra Hall (now Symphony Center) at 220 South Michigan Avenue. Garland's model was the New York Players Club.

It operates under laws for 501(c)(7) Social and Recreation Clubs; in 2024 it claimed total revenue of $687,396 and total assets of $1,741,377.

== Mission and purpose ==
According to the Cliff Dwellers' Articles of Incorporation, the club was formed to "encourage, foster and develop higher standards of art, literature and craftsmanship; to promote the mutual acquaintance of art lovers, art workers and authors; to maintain in the City of Chicago a club house and to provide therein galleries, libraries and exhibition facilities for the various lines of art, in support of the foregoing purposes." The name of the Club is said to be based on the novel The Cliff Dwellers by Henry Blake Fuller. Alternatively, it refers to the ancient cliff-dwelling Indians of the Southwest, for a club that is perching on high ledges and values the arts.

== History ==
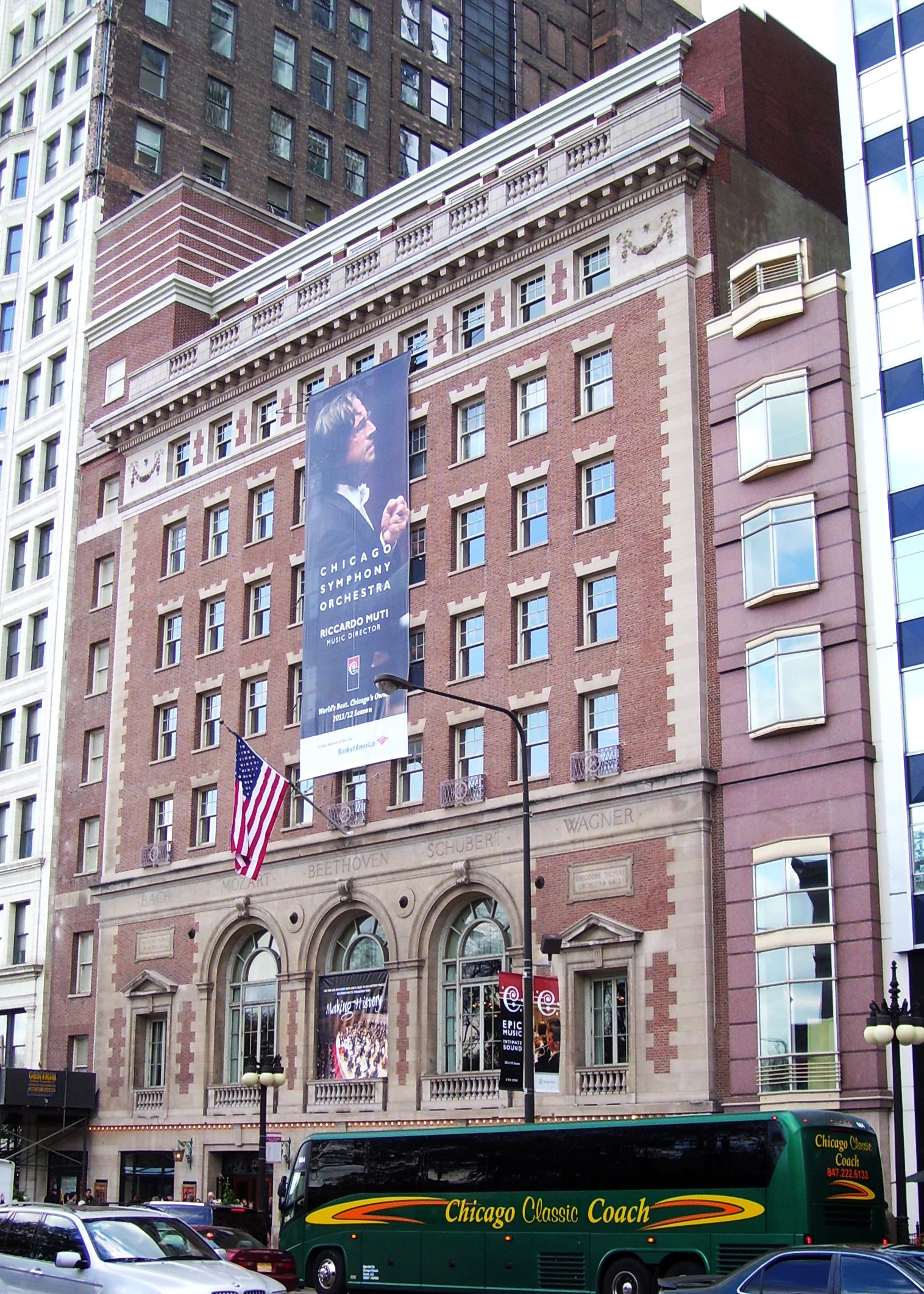
Symphony Center, home of Cliff Dwellers Club from 1907 through 1996

=== 1907–1996 ===
The club's interior, and the meeting space called the "kiva", was designed by Chicago architect Howard Van Doren Shaw, and featured the mural Navaho by John Warner Norton. Charter members of the club included Garland's brother-in-law Lorado Taft, a noted sculptor; educator and author William Morton Payne; architect Frank Lloyd Wright; architects A.B. Pond and I.K. Pond; the landscape architect Jens Jensen, and many other civic and cultural figures. The Cliff Dwellers' space in Orchestra Hall was ready for occupancy on January 6, 1909, when inaugural ceremonies were held. Under the original by-laws, the Club's membership was limited to men. Women have been admitted as members since 1984. The Club became a meeting place for artists and lovers of the fine arts, through dinners and programs and performances by many local artists, and the ongoing camaraderie provided by a place to meet, eat and talk at a designated members table which is open to all Cliff Dwellers members.

=== 1996 to now ===
In 1996, the Cliff Dwellers moved their meeting place from the penthouse above Orchestra Hall (now Symphony Center) to the 22nd floor of the Borg-Warner building. The private club continues to operate as a non-profit organization for men and women either professionally engaged in, or who support, the fine arts and the performing arts. The Club maintains a collection at the Newberry Library. The Club has continued its tradition of sponsoring programs and performances and providing a space for the lively exchange of ideas.

=== Presidents ===
The Cliff Dwellers has been led by several of its charter members and their tradition has been carried on, with presidents who have been engaged as writers, architects, scholars, publishers and lay members who love and support the arts.

- Hamlin Garland (1907–1914)
- Charles L. Hutchinson (1915–16)
- Karleton Hackett (1917–1918)
- William O. Goodman (1919–1920)
- Henry Kitchell Webster (1921)
- Ralph E. Clarkson (1922–1923)
- Horace S. Oakley (1924)
- Karl E. Harriman (1925–1926)
- Frederick Stock (1927–1928)
- Carter Harrison IV (1929)
- William A. Nitze (1930–1931)
- Thomas E. Tallmadge (1932–1933)
- Irving K. Pond (1934–1935)
- Herbert E. Hyde (1936–1937)
- Elmer E. Forsberg (1938–1939)
- Ralph Fletcher Seymour (1940–1941)
- Charles F. Kelly (1942–1943)
- Wilfred E. Garrison (1944–1945)
- Ralph Horween (1946–1947)
- W.W. Kimball (1948–1949)
- Franklin J. Meine (1950–1951)
- N. Kellogg Fairbank Jr. (1952–1953)
- B. Fred Wise (1954–1955)
- R. Vale Faro (1956–1957)
- J. Biedler Camp (1958–1959)
- Paul D. McCurry (1960–1961)
- Leo Sowerby (1962)
- Rolfe Renouf (1963–1964)
- Addis M. Osborne (1965–1969)
- Roy Berg (1969–1972)
- Manly W. Mumford (1973–1974)
- Henry Regnery (1975–1976)
- Irl Marshall (1977)
- Leo E. Heim (1978–1979)
- Charles F. Harding, III (1980)
- J. William Cuncannan (1981–1982)
- William J. Isaacson (1983)
- Wilbert R. Hasbrouck (1984–1985)
- Jerrold R. Zisook (1986–1987)
- Gertrude L. Kerbis (1988–1989)
- Walker C. Johnson (1990–1992)
- Chester R. Davis Jr. (1993–1994)
- John A. McDermott (1995–1996)
- Karl Zerfoss (1997–1998)
- Kristine Fallon (1999)
- Allen Kamp (2000–2001)
- William M. Getzoff (2002–2003)
- Jack W. Zimmerman (2004–2005)
- William J. Bowe (2006–2007)
- Larry E. Lund (2008–2009)
- Brian A. Bernardoni (2010–2011)
- Leslie Recht (2012–2013)
- Charles R. Hasbrouck (2014–2015)
- David Chernoff (2016–2017)
- Eve Moran (2018–2019)
- Carla J. Funk (2020–2022)
- Benjamin R. Johnson (2022–2024)
- Anne T. Sullivan (2024–2026)
- Joan L. Pantsios (2026–present)

=== Notable members ===
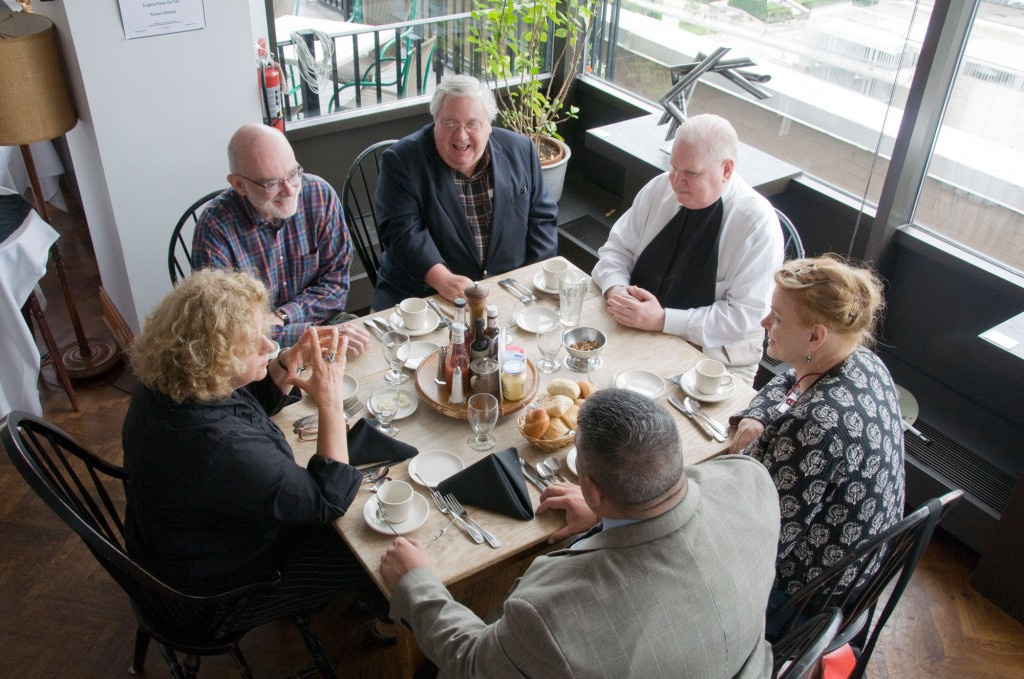
The members table in the Club dining room

Many well-known Chicago figures have been active members of The Cliff Dwellers over the years. Members have included:

- George Ade
- David Adler
- Solon Spencer Beman
- Jacob Burck
- Daniel Burnham
- John Alden Carpenter
- Sir Alfred East
- Roger Ebert
- Arthur Jerome Eddy
- George Fitch
- Wilson Irvine
- Cyrus Hall McCormick II
- William Vaughn Moody
- Horace Sweeney Oakley
- Wallace Rice
- James Whitcomb Riley
- Carl Sandburg
- Joseph Lyman Silsbee
- Adlai Stevenson III
- Louis Sullivan
- Booth Tarkington
- Bert Leston Taylor

Under the Club's by-laws, "any person of reputation for creative work or for distinguished service in the field of literature or arts may be elected an honorary member." Authors Stuart Dybek and Scott Turow, Chicago sculptors Terrence Karpowicz and Richard Hunt, Chicago historian Tim Samuelson, investor and philanthropist Richard Driehaus, photographer and journalist Lee Bey, and architect Carter Manny are recent honorary members of the Club.

== Exhibitions, performances, and lectures ==
The Club currently has exhibitions of sculpture and visual arts, which are mounted every other month. In addition, the Club hosts numerous events every month, showcasing musicians, dancers, and actors in unique and exciting performances. Over the years, the Club has also opened its doors to many outstanding writers and artists in Chicago for special lectures and programs.

== Arts Foundation ==
The Cliff Dwellers Arts Foundation operates as a charitable adjunct to the private club. The Foundation's stated mission is to support the arts. Throughout the year, the Foundation provides grants to arts-oriented organizations and individuals, presents performances at the Club, and sponsors an annual music competition. Visual arts grant recipients also often showcase their art at the Club. Funds are contributed by members of The Cliff Dwellers and are distributed biannually. It is a 501(c)(3) Public Charity.

== Affiliate clubs ==
The Cliff Dwellers has numerous affiliate clubs across the country and around the world. These include the Arts Club of Chicago and the Quadrangle Club (University of Chicago) (also based in Chicago), the Cosmos Club (based in Washington, DC), the National Arts Club and Salmagundi Club in New York City, and the Lansdowne Club in London, England.
