= Horace Smith =

Horace Smith may refer to:

- Horace Smith (poet) (1779–1849), English poet and novelist
- Horace Smith (inventor) (1808–1893), co-founder of Smith & Wesson
- Horace B. Smith (1826–1888), U.S. Representative from New York
- Horace Smith (New Brunswick politician) (1914–2001), Canadian politician
- Horace H. Smith (1905–1976), American diplomat
- Horace Percy Smith (1858–1928), British chartered accountant in Hong Kong
- Horace Smith (Australian cricketer) (1892–1977), Australian public servant and cricketer
- Dennis Smith (New Zealand cricketer) (Horace Dennis Smith, 1913–1986), New Zealand cricketer
- Horace Smith (footballer) (1908–1975), footballer for Coventry City and Nottingham Forest
