= Horace Clark =

Horace Clark may refer to:

- Horace Clark (assemblyman), New York state assemblyman
- Horace F. Clark (1815–1873), U.S. Representative and railroad executive
- Horace Clark (cricketer) (1889–1967), English cricketer
- Horace Clarke (1939–2020), American baseball player
