= Horace Taylor =

Horace Taylor may refer to:

- Horace D. Taylor (1821–1890), commission merchant and mayor of Houston
- Horace Adolphus Taylor (1837–1910), American politician from Wisconsin
- Horace Taylor (artist) (1881-1934), British artist
- Horace Taylor (cricketer) (1895–1961), English cricketer
- Horace Taylor (wrestler), English wrestler
