= Horace King =

Horace King may refer to:

- Horace King (architect) (1807–1885), American bridge architect
- Horace King (footballer) (1883–1940), English footballer
- Horace King, Baron Maybray-King (1901–1986), British politician, Speaker of the House of Commons
- Horace King (English cricketer) (1915–1974), English cricketer
- Horace King (Barbadian cricketer) (1928–2016), Barbadian cricketer
- Horace King (American football) (born 1953), American football player

== See also ==
- James Horace King (1873–1955), Canadian physician and parliamentarian
