= South Los Angeles =

- Region of Los Angeles County
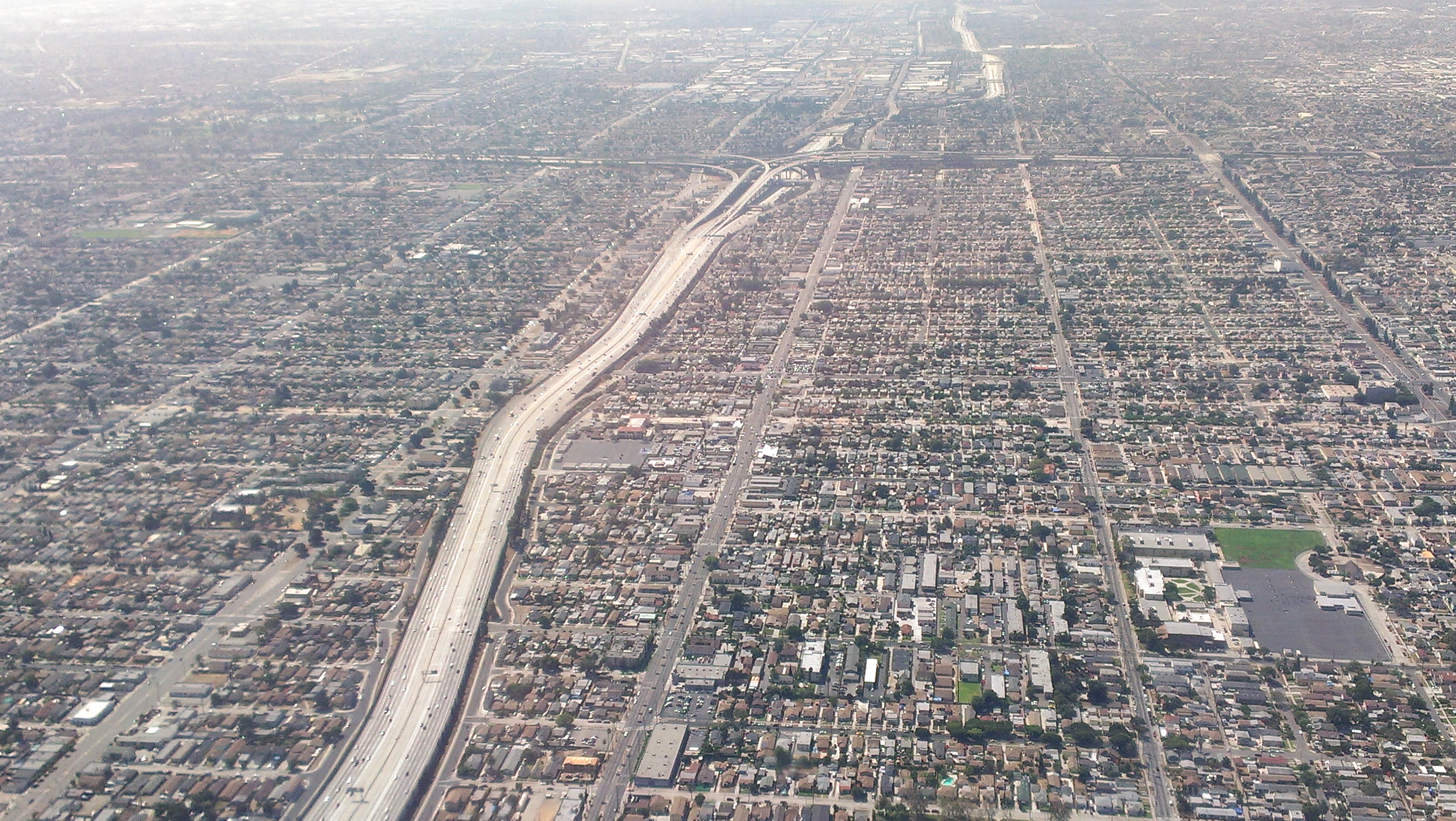
- The junction of the 110 and the 105 freeways

- Location in the Los Angeles Metropolitan Area
- Coordinates: 33°58′50″N 118°17′10″W
- Country: United States
- State: California
- County: Los Angeles
- Cities: Los Angeles; Inglewood
- Unincorporated areas: View Park–Windsor Hills; West Athens; Westmont; Florence-Graham; Willowbrook

South Los Angeles is an urban region in southern Los Angeles County, California, United States, lying mostly within the city limits of Los Angeles, south of downtown. It is defined on Los Angeles city maps as a 16-square-mile (41 km^{2}) rectangle. In 2003, the Los Angeles City Council renamed the area from South Central Los Angeles to its current name.

The name South Los Angeles can also refer to a larger 51-square-mile (130 km^{2}) region that includes areas within the city limits of Los Angeles as well as five unincorporated areas in the southern portion of Los Angeles County.

== Geography ==
=== City of Los Angeles ===
The City of Los Angeles delineates the South Los Angeles Community Plan area as an area of 15.5 square miles (40 km^{2}). Adjacent communities include West Adams, Baldwin Hills, and Leimert Park to the west, and Southeast Los Angeles (the 26-neighborhood area east of the Harbor Freeway) on the east.

=== Los Angeles Times Mapping Project ===
According to the Los Angeles Times Mapping Project, the South Los Angeles region comprises 51 square miles (130 km^{2}), consisting of 25 neighborhoods within the city of Los Angeles as well as three unincorporated neighborhoods in the county of Los Angeles.

=== Google Maps ===
Google Maps delineates a similar area to the Los Angeles Times Mapping Project with notable differences on the western border. On the northwest, it omits a section of Los Angeles west of La Brea Avenue. On the southwest, it includes a section of the city of Inglewood north of Century Boulevard. (Note: Where other reliable sources are available for the boundaries of neighborhoods, they should be treated preferentially to Google Maps and Google Street View. It is difficult if not impossible to verify as they are subject to change and documentation and archives are not available.)

=== Districts and neighborhoods ===
According to the Mapping L.A. survey of the Los Angeles Times, the South Los Angeles region consists of the following neighborhoods:

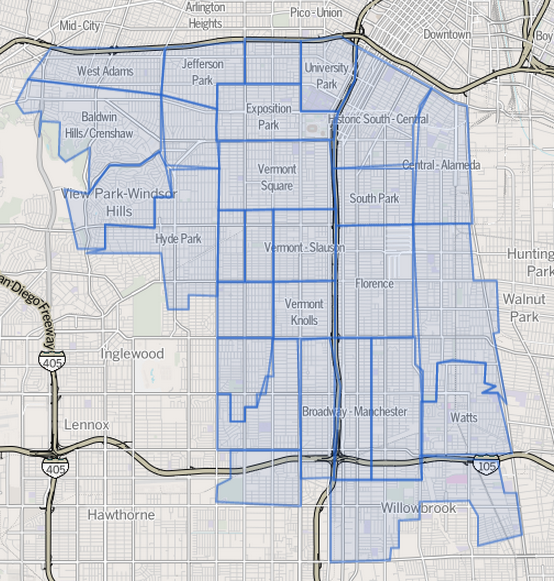
The South Los Angeles region as mapped by the Los Angeles Times

==== City of Los Angeles ====
- Adams-Normandie
- Baldwin Hills/Crenshaw
- Broadway-Manchester
- Central-Alameda
- Chesterfield Square
- Exposition Park
- Florence
- West Park Terrace
- Green Meadows
- Harvard Park
- Historic South Central
- Hyde Park
- Jefferson Park
- Leimert Park
- Manchester Square
- Nevin
- South Park
- University Park
- Vermont Knolls
- Vermont Square
- Vermont Vista
- Vermont-Slauson
- Watts
- West Adams

==== Unincorporated county neighborhoods ====
- Athens
- Florence-Firestone-Graham
- Westmont
- Willowbrook
- View Park-Windsor Hills

== History ==
=== 1800s–1920s ===
In the eastern side of South Los Angeles (which the city calls the "Southeastern CPA") roughly east of the Harbor Freeway, the area grew southward in the late 1800s along the ever-longer streetcar routes. Areas north of Slauson Boulevard were mostly built out by the late 1910s, while south of Slauson land was mostly undeveloped, much used by Chinese and Japanese Americans growing produce. In 1903, the farmers were bought out and Ascot Park racetrack was built, which turned into a "den of gambling and drinking". In the late 1910s the park was razed and freed up land for quick build-up of residential and industrial buildings in the 1920s.

"In 1905...James Furlong subdivided...The Furlong Tract, Los Angeles County's first real African American community...bounded by Long Beach Avenue and Alameda Street, 50th and 55th Streets...now the Central Alameda neighborhood..."

Florence O'Brien was a resident of The Furlong Tract.

Inglewood, South Central Los Angeles, trace back to the beginning of the 20th Century.

=== 1920s–1940s ===
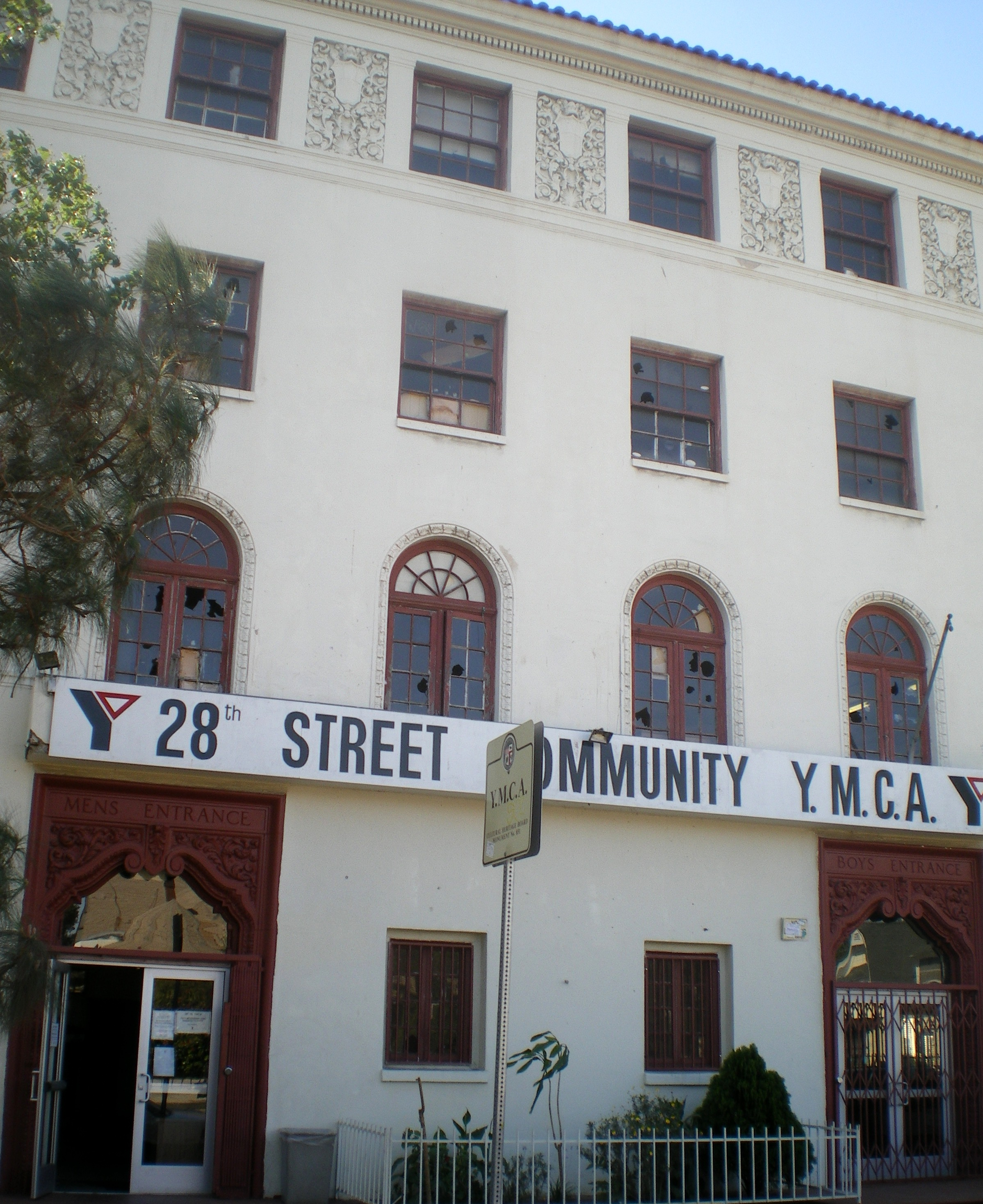
The historic 28th Street YMCA.

Until the 1920s, the South Los Angeles neighborhood of West Adams was one of the most desirable areas of the City. As the wealthy were building stately mansions in West Adams and Jefferson Park, the White working class was establishing itself in Crenshaw and Hyde Park. Affluent blacks gradually moved into West Adams and Jefferson Park. As construction along the Wilshire Boulevard corridor gradually increased in the 1920s, the development of the city was drawn west of downtown and away from South Los Angeles.

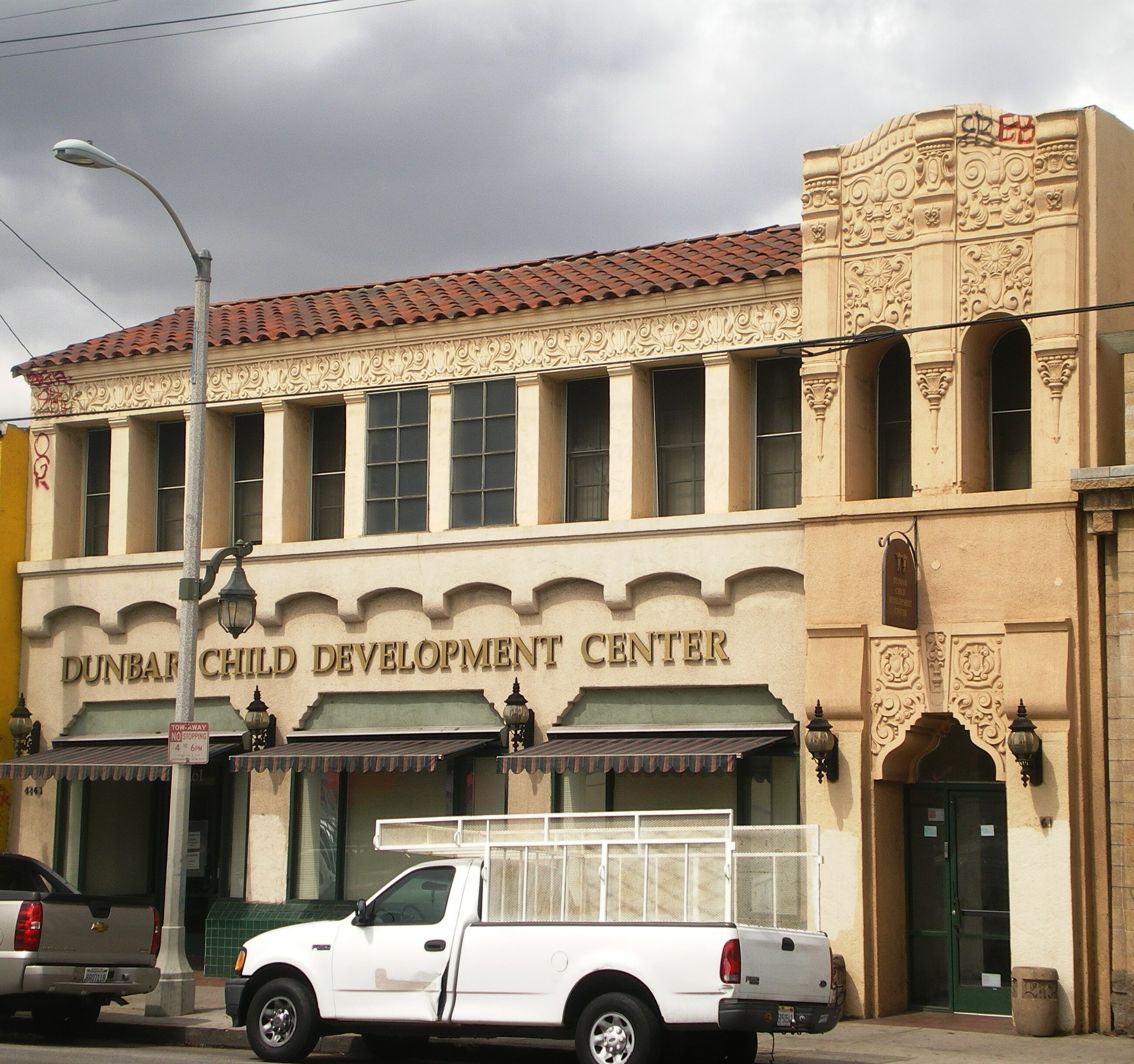
The historic Spanish Colonial Revival style Golden State Mutual Insurance Building, built 1928.

"By 1940, approximately 70 percent of the black population of Los Angeles was confined to the Central Avenue corridor"; the area of modest bungalows and low-rise commercial buildings along Central Avenue emerged as the heart of the black community in southern California. Originally, the city's black community was concentrated around what is now Little Tokyo, but began moving south after 1900. It had one of the first jazz scenes in the western U.S., with trombonist Kid Ory a prominent resident. Under racially restrictive covenants, blacks were allowed to own property only within the "Slauson Box" (the area bounded by Main, Slauson, Alameda, and Washington) and in Watts, as well as in small enclaves elsewhere in the city. The working- and middle-class blacks who poured into Los Angeles during the Great Depression and in search of jobs during World War II found themselves penned into what was becoming a severely overcrowded neighborhood. During the war, blacks faced such dire housing shortages that the Housing Authority of the City of Los Angeles built the virtually all-black and Latino Pueblo Del Rio project, designed by Richard Neutra.

During this time, African Americans remained a minority alongside whites, Asians, and Hispanics; but by the 1930s those groups moved out of the area, African Americans continued to move in, and eastern South LA became majority black. Whites in previously established communities south of Slauson, east of Alameda and west of San Pedro streets persecuted blacks moving beyond established "lines", and thus blacks became effectively restricted to the area in between.

=== 1948–1960s ===
By the 1940s, the demographics of South Los Angeles were rapidly changing. In 1940, the region was 80% white and 15% black. By the mid 1950s, black people were nearly half of the region's population. Violence was becoming more common as well. According to LAPD crime reports, despite being only 4% of the population in 1940, blacks accounted for 37% of the murder suspects and 35% of the victims. By 1952, The Newton Division (South Central) had a murder rate of 80 per 100,000, a rate 15 times higher than the national average. As the 1950s rolled on, black people made up half of all those arrested for serious violent crimes in L.A.-murder, rape, robbery and aggravated assault, despite making up only 11% of the city.

Many white people fled both South Los Angeles and Compton, which shifted the demographics. South LA's white population dropped from 80% in 1940 to 10% by 1970, while the black portion rose from 15% to 80% in the same time period. Compton was 95% white in 1950; by 1980, it was 1%. As violence continued to rise, more white people fled, and black gangs such as the Slausons and Businessmen were formed.

As in most urban areas, 1950s freeway construction radically altered the geography of southern Los Angeles. Freeway routes tended to reinforce traditional segregation lines.

=== 1970s–mid 2000s ===
Beginning in the 1970s, the rapid decline of the area's manufacturing base resulted in a loss of the jobs that had allowed skilled union workers to enjoy a middle-class lifestyle. Downtown Los Angeles' service sector, which had long been dominated by unionized African Americans earning relatively fair wages, replaced most black workers with newly arrived Mexican and Central American immigrants.

Widespread unemployment, poverty and street crime contributed to the rise of street gangs in South Central, such as the Crips and the Bloods. The gangs became even more powerful with money coming in from drugs, especially the crack cocaine trade that was dominated by gangs in the 1980s. By the early 2000's this area became a major flashpoint of race based gang killings. In the mid 1990s, the Mexican Mafia, a prison gang with control over most of the Latino gangs in L.A., gave the green light to "kill all blacks in sight".

Paul Feldman of the Los Angeles Times wrote in 1989:

Leaders of the black community regret the branding of a large, predominantly black sector of the city as South-Central, saying it amounts to a subtle form of racial stereotyping.

He added that they believed such "distinctive neighborhoods" as Leimert Park, Lafayette Square and the Crenshaw District were "well-removed" from South Central.

In 1992, this area was at the center of the Los Angeles riots, also known as the Los Angeles Uprising, which were sparked after an all-White jury acquitted Los Angeles Police Department officers who were on trial for the videotaped police brutality of Rodney King.

=== 2010s ===
By the early 2010s, the crime rate of South Los Angeles had declined significantly. Redevelopment, improved police patrol, community-based peace programs, gang intervention work, and youth development organizations lowered the murder and crime rates to levels that had not been seen since the 1940s and 1950s. Nevertheless, South Los Angeles was still known for its gangs at the time. After leading the nation in homicides again in 2002, the City Council of Los Angeles voted to change the name South Central Los Angeles to South Los Angeles on all city documents in 2003, a move supporters said would "help erase a stigma that has dogged the southern part of the city."

On August 11, 2014, just two days after the shooting of Michael Brown in Ferguson, Missouri, a resident of South L.A., Ezell Ford, described as "a mentally ill 25-year-old man," was fatally shot by two Los Angeles police officers (see Shooting of Ezell Ford). Since then, a number of protests focused on events in Ferguson have taken place in South Los Angeles.

After the 2008 economic recession, housing prices in South Los Angeles recovered significantly, and by 2018, many had come to see South Los Angeles as a prime target for gentrification amid rising real estate values. Residents and activists are against market-rate housing as they have concerns that these projects will encourage landlords to sell, redevelop their properties or jack up rents. Under California law, cities can't reject residential projects based on these criticisms if the project complies with applicable planning and zoning rules. The construction of the K Line light rail through the neighborhood has stimulated the building of denser multistory projects, especially around the new stations. The NFL Stadium in Inglewood also encourages gentrification according to activists.

Real estate values in South Los Angeles were further bolstered by news that Los Angeles will host the 2028 Olympics, with many of the games to be hosted on or near the USC campus.

=== Early 2020s–present ===
Violent crime in South Los Angeles increased significantly during the COVID-19 pandemic. Recession caused by the pandemic sparked gang warfare that rivaled all-time high statistics, with homicide figures similar to those of late 1990s to early-to-mid 2000s.

South Los Angeles has seen a significant increase in its Hispanic population due to gentrification.

== Demographics ==
By the end of the 1980s, South Los Angeles had an increasing number of Hispanics and Latinos, mostly in the northeastern section of the region.

According to scholars, "Between 1970 and 1990 the South LA area went from 80% African American and 9% Latino to 50.3% African American and 44% Latino."

Many African Americans from South Los Angeles have moved to Palmdale and Lancaster in the Antelope Valley. South Los Angeles has received immigrants from Mexico and Central America.

According to the city's "2014 South Los Angeles Community Plan Area Demographic Profile", South Los Angeles had a population of 271,040 residents with the following racial and ethnic balance: Race: Asian - 4.9%, White - 21.4%, African-American - 28.7%, Other Race - 39.4%. Ethnicity (Hispanic or Latino Origin by Race): Not Hispanic or Latino - 39%, Hispanic or Latino - 61%. According to the census, for the category of "race", respondents self-identified as one of the following: White, African-American, American Indian/Alaska Native, Asian, Native Hawaiian/Pacific Islander, Some Other Race, or Two or More Races. For the category of "ethnicity", they self-identified as either "Hispanic or Latino" or "Not Hispanic or Latino".

According to the 2000 United States census, Mexican and Unspecified African were the most common ancestries. Mexico and El Salvador are the most common foreign places of birth.

== Education ==
South Los Angeles is home to the University of Southern California, a private research university in the University Park neighborhood. It is California's oldest private research university.

=== Los Angeles Unified School District ===
The following LAUSD schools fall within the boundaries of South Los Angeles.

LAUSD Elementary Schools

- Coliseum Street Elementary
- Graham Elementary
- Grape Street Elementary
- La Salle Ave Dual Language Elementary
- Lovelia P. Flournoy Elementary
- Manchester Avenue Elementary
- Raymond Avenue Elementary
- Normandie Avenue Elementary
- Russell Elementary
- Foshay Learning Center
- 20th Street Elementary
- 28th Street Elementary
- 68th Street Elementary
- 75th Street Elementary
- 107th Street Elementary
- 109th Street Elementary
- 112th Street Elementary
- 116th Street Elementary
- 118th Street Elementary
- Hooper Ave Elementary

LAUSD Middle Schools

- Audubon Middle School
- Carver Middle School
- Charles Drew Middle School
- Clinton Middle School
- Edwin Markham Middle School
- John Adams Middle School
- Mary McLeod Bethune Middle School
- Samuel Gompers Middle School
- Thomas Edison Middle School
- Los Angeles Academy Middle School
- Foshay Learning Center

LAUSD High Schools

- Crenshaw High School
- Susan Miller Dorsey High School
- Locke High School
- John C Fremont High School
- Washington Preparatory High School
- Thomas Jefferson High School
- David Starr Jordan High School
- Diego Rivera Learning Complex
- King-Drew Senior High Medicine and Science Magnet
- Mervyn M Dymally Senior High
- Santee Education Complex High School
- Foshay Learning Center
- Orthopaedic Hospital Medical Magnet High School
- Manual Arts High School
- Dr. Maya Angelou Community High School

LAUSD 6-12 schools:

- Boys Academic Leadership Academy

=== Colleges and Universities ===
Community Colleges

- Los Angeles Southwest College
- Los Angeles Trade Tech College

Universities

- University of Southern California
- Mount St. Mary's University (Los Angeles)

== Landmarks ==
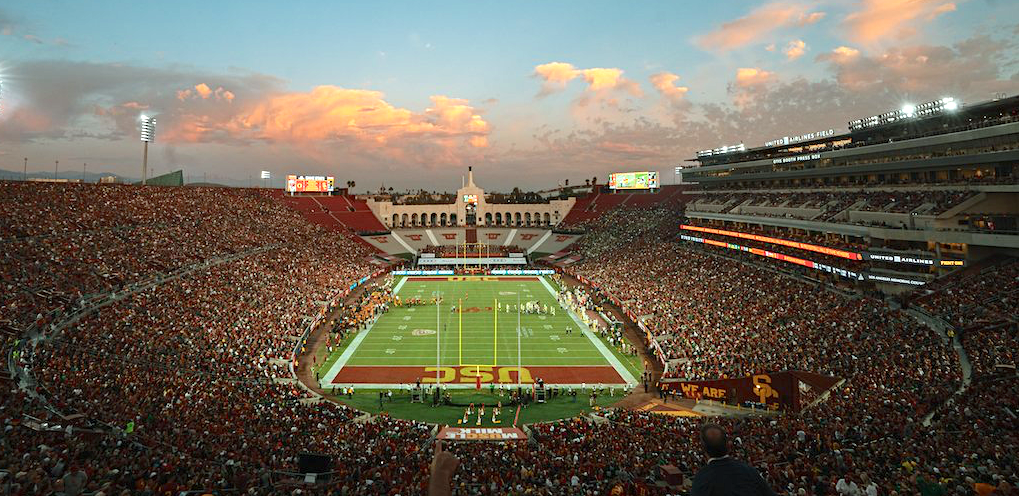
The Los Angeles Memorial Coliseum

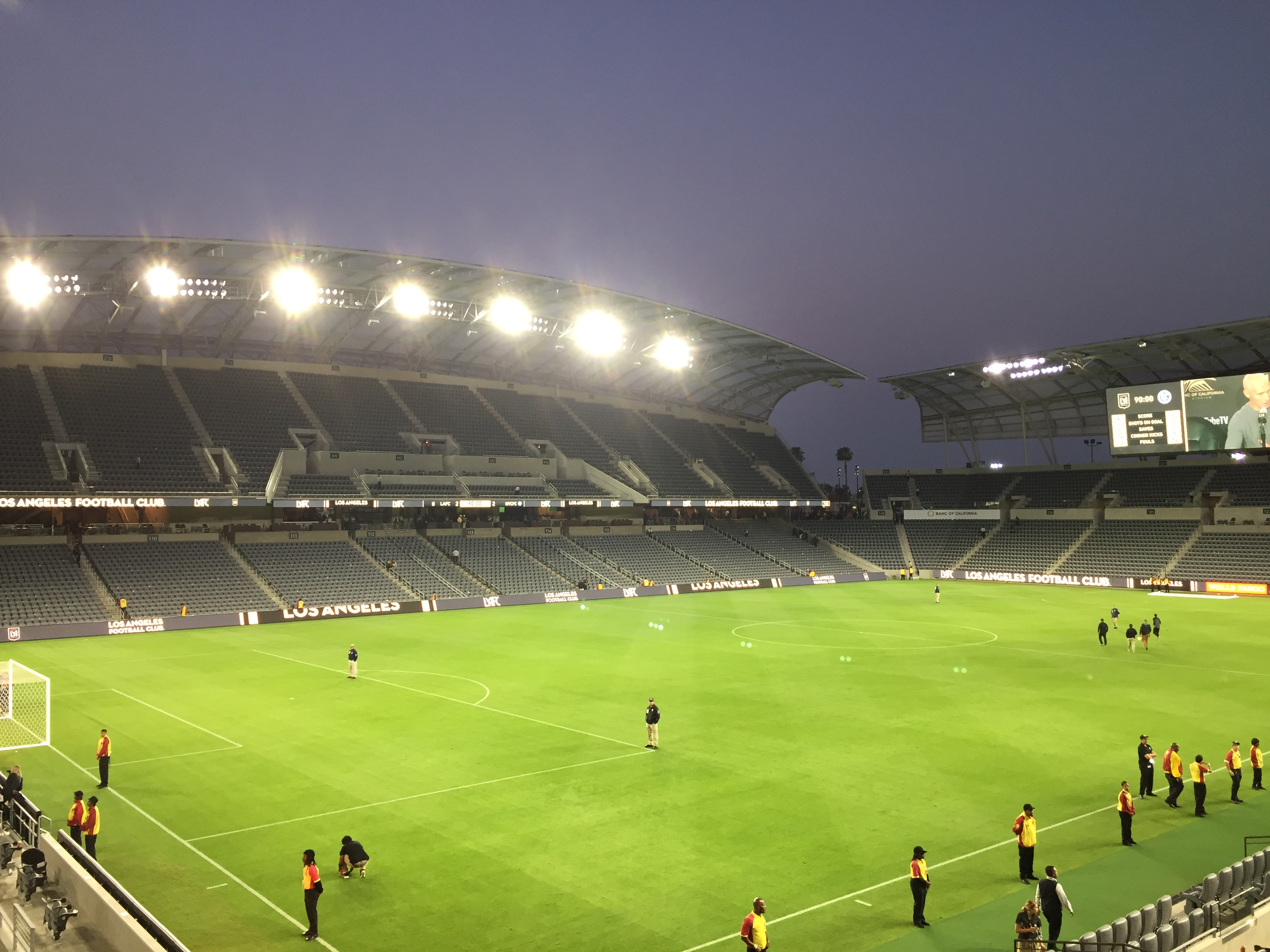
The BMO Stadium

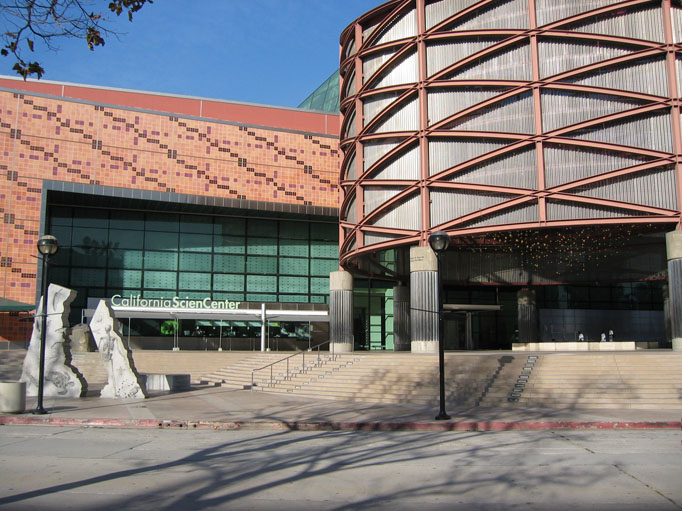
The California Science Center

- BMO Stadium
- California African American Museum
- California Science Center
- Natural History Museum of Los Angeles County
- Central Avenue
- Clark Library
- Coca-Cola Building
- Dunbar Hotel
- Exposition Park
- Fire Station No. 30
- Leimert Park
- Lincoln Theater
- Los Angeles Memorial Coliseum
- Los Angeles Sports Arena (demolished)
- Lucas Museum of Narrative Art (under construction)
- King/Drew Medical Center
- Second Baptist Church
- 28th Street YMCA
- University of Southern California
- Watts Towers

== Notable people ==
=== Music and entertainment ===
==== A–K ====
- Ab-Soul
- Ahmad Jones
- Barry White
- Brownside
- Blxst
- Charles Mingus
- Charles Wright & the Watts 103rd Street Rhythm Band
- CJ Mac
- Coolio
- Cozz
- Da Lench Mob
- Dom Kennedy
- Eric Dolphy
- Etta James
- Glasses Malone
- Hakeem Khaaliq
- Hampton Hawes
- Ice Cube
- Issa Rae
- Jay Rock
- Jhené Aiko
- John Cage, musician
- Johnny "J"
- Kam
- K-Dee
- Kausion
- Keb' Mo'
- Kurupt

==== L–Z ====
- L.V.
- Eva Marcille
- Meghan Markle
- Montell Jordan
- Murs
- Nipsey Hussle
- O.F.T.B.
- Patrice Rushen
- Ras Kass
- Robin Russell, drummer, member of New Birth/Nite-Liters (band)
- Schoolboy Q
- Scott Shaw
- Shawn Fonteno
- Sir Jinx
- Skee-Lo
- South Central Cartel
- Spider Loc
- Tiffany Haddish
- Tone Lōc
- Tyrese Gibson
- WC
- Young Maylay
- Etta James
- Ty Dolla $ign
- Terrace Martin

=== Sports and athletes ===
- Andre Miller
- Baron Davis
- Darryl Strawberry
- Eddie Murray
- Eric Davis
- Florence Griffith-Joyner
- Ozzie Smith
- Russell Westbrook
- Steve Smith Sr.
- Trayvon Robinson
- Willie Mack
- DeSean Jackson
- Vontaze Burfict

=== Politicians ===
==== A–K ====
- Karen Bass, Mayor of Los Angeles 2022–present, State Assembly 2004–2010, U.S. House of Representatives, 2011–2022
- Tom Bradley (South Central, Los Angeles City Council, 1963–73; Mayor of the City of Los Angeles, 1973–93
- Yvonne Brathwaite Burke, State Assembly, 1967–73; U.S. House of Representatives, 1973–79; Los Angeles County Board of Supervisors, 1979–80 and 1992–2008
- Julian C. Dixon, State Assembly, 1973–78; U.S. House of Representatives, 1979–2000
- Mervyn M. Dymally, State Assembly, 1962–68 and 2002–08; California State Senate, 1969–74; Lieutenant Governor of California, 1975–79; U.S. House of Representatives, 1981–93
- Robert C. Farrell (born 1936), journalist and member of the Los Angeles City Council, 1974–1991, prepared report on unemployment in Watts
- Augustus Hawkins, State Assembly, 1932–62; U.S. House of Representatives, 1962–1991
- Marqueece Harris-Dawson City Council, 2015–present)
- Horace Hiller (1844–1898), member of the Los Angeles Common Council
- Nate Holden, State Senator, 1974–78; Los Angeles City Council, 1987–2002

==== L–Z ====
- Gilbert Lindsey, Los Angeles City Council, 1962–91
- James G. McAllister, president of the South Los Angeles Property Owners' Protective League and City Council member
- Billy G. Mills, Los Angeles City Council, 1963–1974; Los Angeles Superior Court, 1974–??
- Holly Mitchell, State Assembly, 2010–present
- Kevin Murray, State Assembly, 1994–98; State Senate, 1998–2006
- Jan Perry, Los Angeles City Council, 2002–present
- Curren Price, City Council, 1993–97 and 2001–2006; State Assembly, 2006–2009; State Senate, 2009–present
- Mark Ridley-Thomas, Los Angeles City Council, 1991–2002; State Assembly; 2002–06; State Senate 2006–2008; Los Angeles County Board of Supervisors, 2008–present
- Frederick Madison Roberts, State Assembly, 1918–32
- Rita Walters, Los Angeles Unified School District Board, 1979–91; Los Angeles City Council, 1991–2001
- Maxine Waters, State Assembly, 1976–1991; U.S. House of Representatives, 1991–present
- Diane Watson, Los Angeles Unified School District Board, 1975–73; State Senate, 1978–98; United States Ambassador to Micronesia, 1999–2000; U.S. House of Representatives, 2001–2011
- Herb Wesson, State Assembly, 1998–2004; Los Angeles City Council, 2005–present)
- Roderick Wright, State Assembly, 1996–2002; State Senate, 2008–present)

=== Artists, filmmakers and writers ===
- Ron Finley (South LA)
- Mark Bradford (Leimert Park)
- Kody Scott (South LA)
- Catherine Opie (South LA)
- David Ayer (South LA)
- Charles Burnett (Watts)
- Wanda Coleman (Watts)
- John Singleton (South L.A.)
- Ava DuVernay (South L.A.)
- Issa Rae (South L.A.)
- Kehinde Wiley (South L.A.)

=== Education ===
- Rosemarie Allen (born 1950), American academic specialized in diversity, equity, and inclusion

=== Clergy ===
- Frederick K. C. Price (South Los Angeles)—founder and pastor of Crenshaw Christian Center

== Government and infrastructure ==
The Los Angeles County Department of Health Services operates the South Health Center in Watts, Los Angeles, serving South Los Angeles.

== See also ==
- List of districts and neighborhoods in Los Angeles
- History of Los Angeles
- History of African Americans in Los Angeles

Other regions of Los Angeles County

- Angeles National Forest
- Antelope Valley
- Central Los Angeles
- Eastside
- Harbor
- Northeast Los Angeles
- Northwest County
- Pomona Valley
- San Fernando Valley
- San Gabriel Valley
- South Bay
- Santa Monica Mountains
- Southeast County
- Verdugos
- Westside
