= Horus (disambiguation) =

Horus is a god of the ancient Egyptian religion.

Horus may also refer to:

- Horus name, an ancient Egyptian title
- Horus (Greek mythology)

== Other gods ==
- Heru-ur or Horus the Elder, son of Geb and Nut and uncle of Horus
- Harpocrates or Horus the Younger, son of Horus and Hathor

== People ==
- Horus (athlete) (fl. 4th century), an Olympic boxer and Cynic philosopher from Late Roman Egypt
- Horus (wrestler), the ring name of a Mexican professional wrestler
- Horus Aha, a pharaoh
- Horus Bird (pharaoh)
- Horus Sa, a pharaoh
- Horus-son-of-the-wolf, legendary Egyptian magician
- Horus Engels (1914–1991), German artist
- Rey Horus, Mexican wrestler

== Science and technology ==
- Horus (arachnid), a pseudoscorpion genus in the family Olpiidae
- Horus swift, a small bird in the swift family Apodidae
- 1924 Horus, an asteroid
- 21900 Orus, an asteroid
- AMD Horus, a computer bus
- FT-100 Horus, an unmanned aerial vehicle
- HORUS, Herschel Orbital Reconnaissance of the Uranian System (proposed)

== Other uses ==
- Horus (community), a religious movement
- Horus Music, British music company
- Horus: Prince of the Sun, a 1968 Japanese animated film

== See also ==
- Eye of Horus, an ancient Egyptian symbol of protection
- Horace (disambiguation)
