= Horace Phillips =

Horace Phillips may refer to:

- Horace Phillips (baseball) (1853–1896), Pittsburgh Pirates manager
- Horace Phillips (diplomat) (1917–2004), British diplomat
- Horace Phillips (rugby union) (1928–2009), Welsh rugby player
