= Horace Smith (footballer) =

English footballer

Personal information
- Full name: Horace Smith
- Date of birth: 5 July 1908
- Place of birth: Stourbridge, England
- Date of death: 1984 (aged 75–76)
- Height: 5 ft 11 in (1.80 m)
- Position: Midfielder

Senior career*
Years	Team	Apps	(Gls)
1924–1925	Holly Hall		
1925–1929	Brierley Hill Alliance		
1929–1930	Stourbridge		
1930–1931	Coventry City	5	(0)
1931–1935	Merthyr Town		
1935–1936	Stoke City	0	(0)
1936–1937	Nottingham Forest	1	(0)
1937–1939	Shrewsbury Town		
1939	Revo Athletic		
Total		6	(0)
- * Club domestic league appearances and goals

Horace Smith (5 July 1908 – 1975) was a footballer who played in the Football League for Coventry City and Nottingham Forest.

== Career ==
Smith was born in Stourbridge and began his career with Holly Hall, Brierley Hill Alliance and Stourbridge before moving to Third Division South side Coventry City in 1930. He played five times for the Sky Blues in the 1930–31 before leaving for Welsh non-league side Merthyr Town. He spent four years with Merthyr Town and was signed by Stoke City in the 1935–36 season. He left at the end of the campaign without breaking into the first team and he joined Second Division side Nottingham Forest. After only one appearance for Forest, Smith left the club and went on to play for Shrewsbury Town and Revo Athletic.

== Career statistics ==
Appearances and goals by club, season and competition
Club	Season	League			FA Cup		Total	
Club	Season	Division	Apps	Goals	Apps	Goals	Apps	Goals
Coventry City	1930–31	Third Division South	5	0	0	0	5	0
Stoke City	1935–36	First Division	0	0	0	0	0	0
Nottingham Forest	1936–37	Second Division	1	0	0	0	1	0
Career total			6	0	0	0	6	0
