= Horace Green =

English footballer (1918–2000)

Personal information
- Full name: Horace Green
- Date of birth: 23 April 1918
- Place of birth: Barnsley, England
- Date of death: July 2000 (aged 82)
- Positions: Right half; full back

Senior career*
Years	Team	Apps	(Gls)
- Worsbrough Bridge O.B.
1936–1949	Halifax Town	155	(5)
1949–1955	Lincoln City	212	(14)
Total		367	(19)
- * Club domestic league appearances and goals

Horace Green (23 April 1918 – July 2000) was an English professional footballer who made 367 appearances in the Football League playing for Halifax Town and Lincoln City. He played as a right half or full back.

== Life and career ==
Green was born in Barnsley, Yorkshire. He began his football career with Worsbrough Bridge Old Boys, before joining Football League Third Division North club Halifax Town in July 1936. He made his debut in the 1937–38 season, and remained with the club until February 1949, although the Second World War interrupted his league career for seven years. He moved on to Lincoln City, where he was a regular in the starting eleven for five years, making his last first-team appearance in October 1954.

Green died in July 2000.
