= Horace Parmelee =

Horace Parmelee (1889–1957) was a talent manager and a concert promoter and vice president of Columbia Artists Management. He managed Richard Crooks, Ernestine Schumann-Heink, Paul Althouse and Grete Stückgold.
