= Horace James =

Horace James may be:

- Horace James (footballer) (born 1984), Jamaican footballer
- Horace James (minister) (1818–1875), American clergyman who served with the Union Army and assisted freedmen
- Horace James, a fictional character in Flash Forward
