= Horace Champagne =

Canadian artist (born 1937)

- Born: September 17, 1937 (age 88); Montreal, Quebec
- Education: École des Beaux-Arts, Montreal, 1953; Ottawa Art School
- Known for: Pastelist
- Spouse: Réjeanne Pelletier
- Awards: Elected Premier Pastelist by Pastel Society of Canada, 2000; awarded Master Pastelist by The Pastel Society of Eastern Canada.

Horace Champagne (born September 17, 1937) is a Canadian artist from Montreal. He is considered a master of the pastel medium by The Pastel Society of Eastern Canada.

== Life and career ==
Champagne was born in Montreal in 1937. His grandfather was the Hungarian-Canadian pastel artist Charles de Belle. After a career in commercial art, Champagne decided to be an artist and attended the École des beaux-arts de Montreal in 1953 for two years, supplemented by later study at the Ottawa School of Art, workshops and reading.

Champagne had his first exhibition in 1977 in Ottawa of oil paintings on wood. Workshops with artist, teacher and author, Charles Movalli, in Maine and New Hampshire (1978 and 1979) helped him better understand the basics of art and the importance of working out-of-doors. By 1979, Champagne knew that the material he would use to express his art would be pastel, which is peculiarly fitted for ease and rapidity of handling. After travelling to Western Canada and receiving a positive response from galleries in Calgary, Edmonton, and Vancouver, he was able to quit his job as a graphic artist in the advertisement industry and focus on his art full-time.

For the next forty years, he worked in pastel choosing places to record in meticulous detail in Canada from the Pacific to Atlantic coasts and in the Alberta foothills and Rockies. He had favourite locations, such as Quebec City, and often found inspiration in its older streets, monuments and festivals. A workshop in 1982 with Daniel Greene, author of the book Pastel: A Comprehensive Guide to Pastel Painting (1974), in North Salem, New York, helped him realize more fully the variations possible in the pastel medium as well as teaching how to draw from the live model.

In 1988, he bought a house in Sainte-Pétronille, Île d'Orléans, Quebec. Here, too, he painted in pastel subjects such as the interior of his home, filled with antiques, or still-life composed from flowers found in his garden. He also found many subject in Italy as well as Newfoundland where he bought a house by the ocean.

Champagne's works are particularly popular in Calgary, Alberta, where he is represented by Masters Gallery. In 2003, the Calgary Herald wrote that Champagne may be the best pastel artist in the world.

In 2006, he bought a studio in Rose Blanche on the Newfoundland coast, to better depict the sea in his work. He explained Newfoundland's attraction for him and how he paints in an instructional DVD made by VideoMedia, titled Champagne on the rocks, Horace Champagne paints Newfoundland. That same year, he was elected an honorary life member of the Pastel Society of Eastern Canada. In February 2009, the U.S. magazine, the Pastel Journal, included a still life titled Overflowing Beauty by Champagne on its cover and an article about his work by Deborah Secor, titled Joie de Vivre. In 2010, the French magazine Pratique des Arts published an eight-page article on Champagne.

In 2013, he received an invitation of honor to the Exposition international at Giverny, Art du Pastel en France. While there, Champagne gave a workshop on what he calls Plein art (Outdoor painting, on location, on a flat surface). In 2015, the Pastel Society of Eastern Canada produced Horace Champagne: A Man and his Pastels as a tribute to Champagne, authored by Patrice Landry, with 100 pastels by Champagne in full colour.

More critical attention followed: in the fall issue of 2019, The Pastel Society of the West Coast, U.S.A., did an article and interview with Champagne by W. Truman Hosner. Hosner wrote that Horace Champagne has "captured the poetry of the world...his world. He is a national treasure."

Horace Champagne was elected Premier Pastelist by the Pastel Society of Canada in 2000 and awarded Master Pastelist by The Pastel Society of Eastern Canada.

== Memberships ==
Champagne is a member of the Pastel Society of France, the Pastel Society of Eastern Canada and the Pastel Society of America.
