= Horace Viner =

Welsh footballer

Personal information
- Full name: Horace Viner
- Date of birth: 1877
- Place of birth: Chirk, Wales
- Date of death: 1935 (aged 57–58)
- Place of death: Rhyl, Wales
- Position: Goalkeeper

Senior career*
Years	Team	Apps	(Gls)
1903	Birkenhead		
1903–1904	Stoke	1	(0)
1904	Rhyl Athletic		
- * Club domestic league appearances and goals

Horace Viner (1877 – 1935) was a Welsh professional footballer who played in the Football League for Stoke.

== Career ==
Viner was born in Chirk and played for Birkenhead before joining Stoke in 1904. He was signed as back up to Welsh international goalkeeper Leigh Richmond Roose and Jack Benton. Viner's only appearance for Stoke game against Nottingham Forest in March 1904. On his release at the end of the season he joined Rhyl Athletic. After finishing his footballing career at Rhyl, Viner started his own caravan park.

== Career statistics ==
Club	Season	League			FA Cup		Total	
Club	Season	Division	Apps	Goals	Apps	Goals	Apps	Goals
Stoke	1903–04	First Division	1	0	0	0	1	0
Career Total			1	0	0	0	1	0
