= Horace Bundy =

American painter

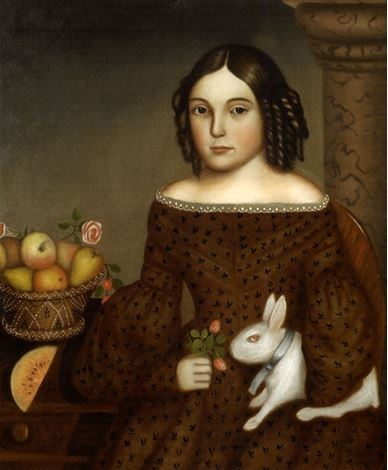
Young Girl with a White Rabbit

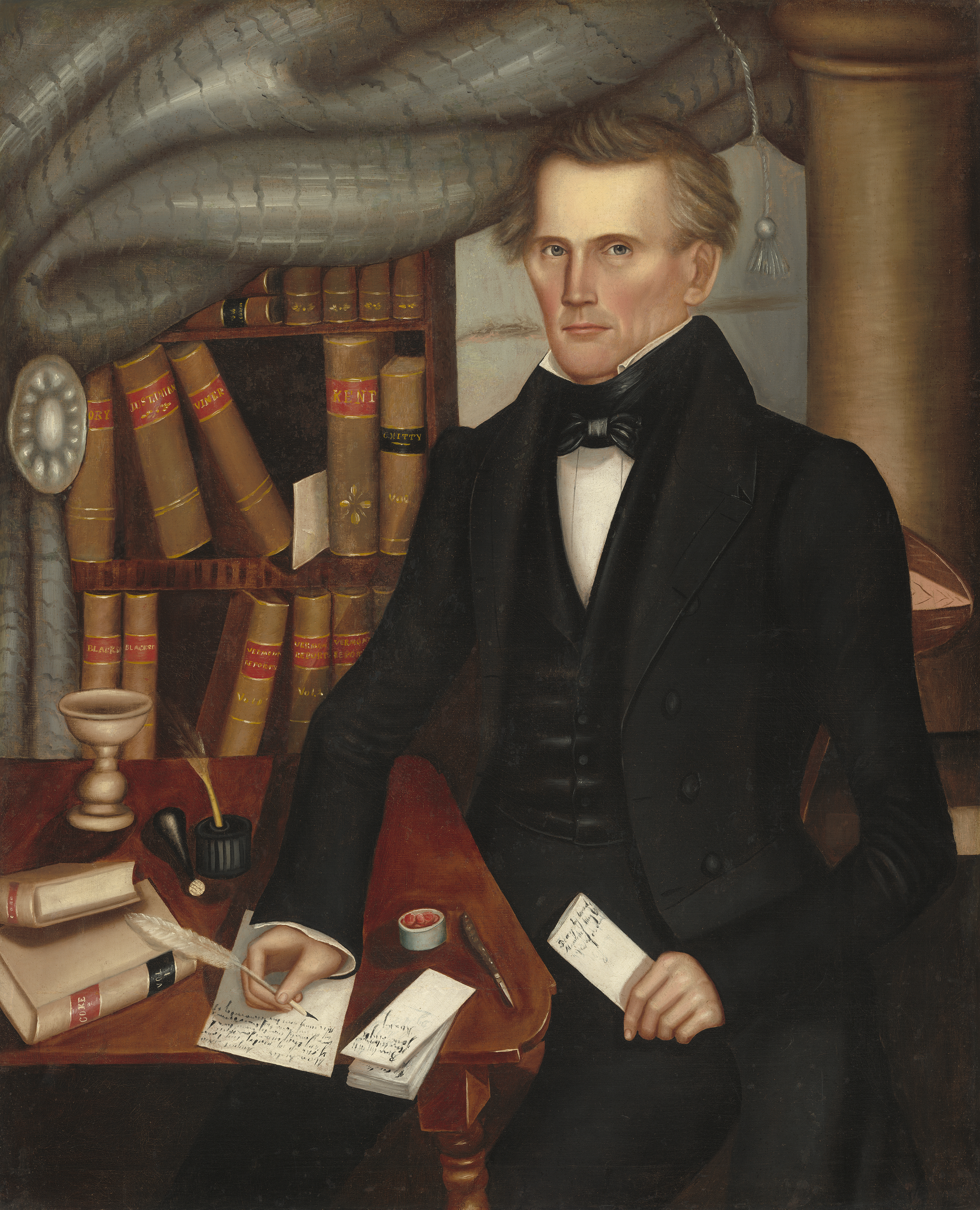
Vermont Lawyer

Horace Bundy (22 July 1814, in Hardwick, Vermont – 15 June 1883, in Concord, New Hampshire) was an itinerant American portrait painter. He is generally classified as a folk artist, due to his lack of formal instruction.

== Biography ==
His early years are apparently undocumented. In 1836, the city directory of Lowell, Massachusetts, lists him as a "carriage maker", so he probably developed his artistic inclinations by painting designs and decorations on sleighs, buckets and signs. In 1837, he married Louisa Lockwood (1814-1907). Four years later, they had settled in North Springfield, Vermont in a home built by her father. They had eight children, only three of whom survived to maturity. Unlike most itinerant artists, all of his paintings are signed and dated and often include the place where they were created; providing a record of his travels.

He was originally a member of the Millerites, an offshoot of the Baptist Church but, by 1844, when their prophecy that the world would end proved to be untrue (an event known as the Great Disappointment), he joined the new Adventist movement. Thereafter, he spent almost as much time preaching as painting. There are records of him having done both in Townshend, Vermont, several locations in New Hampshire and Winchendon, Massachusetts.

He is known to have been active as a painter until at least 1859 and, in the 1860 census, is listed as an artist. Three years later, he was appointed pastor of the Second Advent Church in Lakeport, New Hampshire and was one of its most active leaders, eventually becoming an Elder. In the 1870s, he moved to Concord where he continued to create the occasional portrait from photographs.

He went on a trip to Jamaica in 1883, where he painted on commission from a wealthy planter and made studies of tropical scenery. While there, he contracted typhus and died of its effects shortly after his return to Concord.
