= Horace Waller =

Horace Waller may refer to:

- Horace Waller (activist) (1833–1896), anti-slavery activist
- Horace Waller (soldier) (1896–1917), Victoria Cross recipient
