= Horace Moore =

Horace Moore may refer to:

- Horace Ladd Moore (1837–1914), U.S. Representative from Kansas
- Horace Moore (American football) (1926–2005), American football coach
