= Horace Carpenter =

Horace Carpenter may refer to:

- Horace B. Carpenter (1875–1945), American actor, film director and screenwriter
- Horace Thompson Carpenter (1857–1947), American illustrator, artist and art writer
- Horace Carpenter (priest) (1887–1965), British priest
