= Horace Grangel =

Australian cricketer (1908–1970)

Personal information
- Born: 23 November 1908; Sydney, Australia
- Died: 14 May 1970 (aged 61); Canberra, Australia

Domestic team information
- Years: Team
- 1936: Victoria
- Source: Cricinfo, 22 November 2015

Horace Grangel (23 November 1908 – 14 May 1970) was an Australian cricketer. He played one first-class cricket match for Victoria in 1936.

== See also ==
- List of Victoria first-class cricketers
