= Horace Holley =

Horace Holley may refer to:

- Horace Holley (minister) (1781–1827), Unitarian minister and president of Transylvania University
- Horace Holley (Baháʼí) (1887–1960), follower of the Bahá'í Faith
