= Horace Taylor (artist) =

British artist

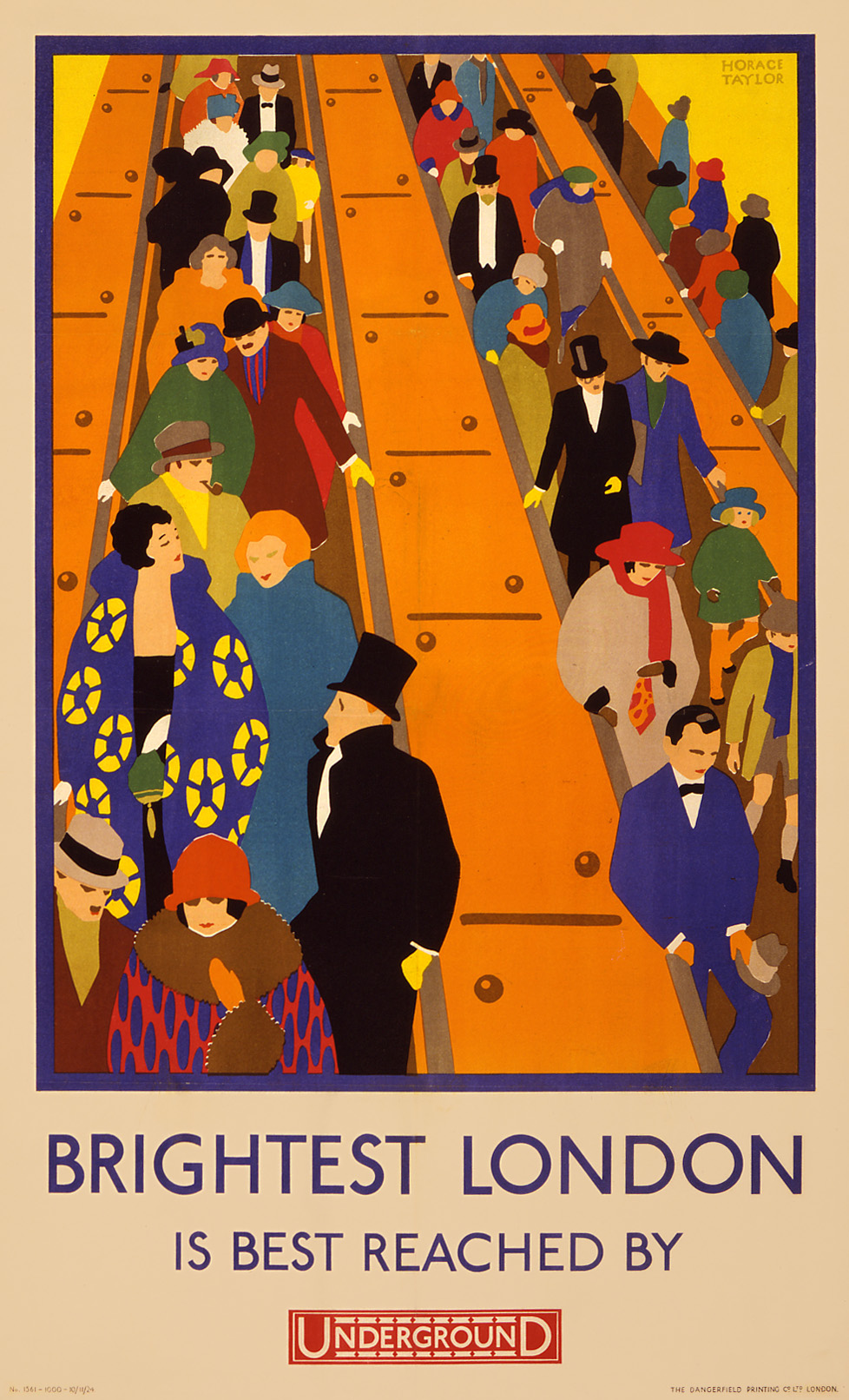
"Brightest London is best reached by Underground" London Underground poster, 1924

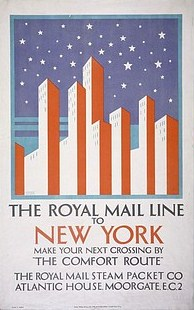
Royal Mail Steam Packet Company, 1925 poster

Horace Christopher Taylor (1881 – 7 February 1934), was a British commercial artist, painter and poster designer, including for the London Underground.

== Early life ==
Taylor was born in Islington, London in 1881, the son of a railway accountant, George Julian Taylor and his wife Matilda Barns.

He trained at the Camden School of Art, the Royal Academy Schools and the Royal Academy of Munich.

== Career ==
He started his career working as a cartoonist for the Manchester Guardian. From 1922, he moved towards being a commercial artist and painter, particularly a poster designer, most notably for the London Underground.

He also designed posters for the Royal Mail Steam Packet Company, Vigil Silk, and the Orient Line.

== Personal life ==
He lived at 14 Temple Fortune Lane in Hampstead Garden Suburb. On 1 June 1921, he married Dulcie Muriel Marriott (1894-1958) in Chelsea, London.

He died in London on 7 February 1934.

== Legacy ==
Three 1926 photographs of Taylor, taken by Howard Coster, are in the collection of the National Portrait Gallery, London.
