= Horace Brown =

Horace Brown may refer to:

- Horace Tabberer Brown (1848–1925), British brewer and chemist
- Horace Brown (musician), American singer
- Horace Brown (footballer) (1860–?), English footballer
