= Horace Venn =

English cricketer (1892–1953)

Horace Venn (4 July 1892 – 23 November 1953) was an English cricketer who played first-class cricket between 1919 and 1925 for Warwickshire. He was born and died at Coventry, now in West Midlands but formerly in Warwickshire.

Venn was prominent as a right-handed batsman in Coventry district club cricket before the First World War, playing for the Foleshill Victoria club, and also appeared in second eleven matches for Warwickshire. He did not at this stage play first-class cricket, but in 1919, he turned out for a "full" Warwickshire side – composed mainly of amateurs – in a first-class non-County Championship game against Worcestershire and, opening the batting, scored 151. In the return match a few weeks later, his 58 in his only innings was the top score of the game. That appears to have encouraged Venn to give a whole season to first-class cricket and he was a regular opening batsman for the first three months of the 1920 season. Initially, he was quite successful, and against Kent at Catford he made 115 out of Warwickshire's total of 233, his second and final first-class century. Wisden Cricketers' Almanack noted: "Strong in defence with a stiff fore-arm forcing stroke, Venn got most of his runs in front of the wicket. He played-on after two and a half hours' batting, having scored 115 out of 222." Venn did not pass 50 in any other innings that season, and his record for the season as a whole was modest, with 591 runs at an average of 16.41 runs per innings.

Venn returned to Warwickshire for a few early matches in the 1921 season, but was not successful; he then played three times in 1922 and once in 1925, again without making much impact.
