= Horace King (English cricketer) =

English cricketer (1915–1974)

Horace David King (10 February 1915 – 7 March 1974) was an English first-class cricketer active 1934–46 who played for Middlesex. He was born in Brentford; died in Worthing.
