= Horace Miller =

Horace or Horrie Miller may refer to:

== People ==
- Horrie Miller (aviator) (1893–1980), Australian aviation pioneer
- Horrie Miller (rugby league) (1882–1967), Australian rugby league footballer and administrator
- Horace Miller (cricketer) (born 1989), Jamaican cricketer
- Horace Miller, American football player in the 2014 Carolina Panthers season
- Horace A. Miller, part owner of the original Pacific Gas and Electric Company
- Horace H. Miller (1826–1877), United States Ambassador to Bolivia in the 1850s

== Fictional characters ==
- Horace Miller, in the musical Miss Liberty
