= Horace Biggin =

English footballer

Personal information
- Full name: Horace Biggin
- Date of birth: 27 May 1897
- Place of birth: Shirebrook, England
- Date of death: 1984 (aged 86–87)
- Position: Inside forward

Senior career*
Years	Team	Apps	(Gls)
1918–1919	Whitwell St Lawrence		
1919	Whitwell Colliery		
1919–1920	West Ham United	2	(0)
1920–1921	Ilkeston United		
1921–1922	Shirebrook		
1922–1923	Retford Town		
1923–1924	Mansfield Town		
1924–1925	Whitwell Colliery		
Total		2	(0)
- * Club domestic league appearances and goals

Horace Biggin (27 May 1897 – 1984) was an English footballer who played in the Football League for West Ham United.
