= Horace Loh =

Taiwanese biochemist

Horace Hao Loh (Chinese: 羅浩; pinyin: Luó Hào; born 28 May 1937) is a Chinese-American biochemist.

Loh graduated from National Taiwan University and completed a doctorate in biochemistry from the University of Iowa, as did his friend Yuan-Chuan Lee. Loh then moved to the University of California, San Francisco as a postdoctoral researcher under Eddy Leong Way, after which he joined the UCSF Medical Center faculty. In 1989, Loh began teaching at the University of Minnesota, where he was named Frederick and Alice Stark Professor of Pharmacology, and later appointed to a Regents Professorship. Loh has been a member of Academia Sinica since 1986.
