= Horace Thompson =

English footballer

Personal information
- Full name: Horace Thompson
- Date of birth: 1900
- Place of birth: Birmingham, England
- Position: Outside left

Senior career*
Years	Team	Apps	(Gls)
1922–1923	Birmingham	1	(0)
- * Club domestic league appearances and goals

Horace Thompson (1900 – after 1922) was an English footballer born in Birmingham who played in the Football League for Birmingham F.C. The only game he played for the club was on 3 February 1923, in a 2–0 defeat away at Oldham Athletic in the First Division, an appearance which is often attributed to Len Thompson.
