= Horace Fletcher (footballer) =

English footballer

Personal information
- Full name: Horace Robert Fletcher
- Date of birth: 1876
- Place of birth: Rotherham, England
- Date of death: September 1931 (aged 54)
- Place of death: Rotherham, England
- Position: Inside left

Senior career*
| Years | Team | Apps | (Gls) |
- Mexborough
| 1897–1898 | Lincoln City | 28 | (6) |
- Rotherham Town
- * Club domestic league appearances and goals

Horace Robert Fletcher (1876 – September 1931), known as either Horace or Robert Fletcher, was an English footballer who scored 6 goals from 28 appearances in the Football League playing for Lincoln City as an inside left. He played in the Midland League for Mexborough, and also played non-league football for Rotherham Town.
