= Horace Rudston =

English cricketer

Horace Rudston (22 November 1878 – 14 April 1962) was an English first-class cricketer, who played twenty one games for Yorkshire County Cricket Club between 1902 and 1907, and one match for the North of England in 1905. He also played for the Yorkshire Second XI (1900–1910), Yorkshire Colts (1900–1902) and Yorkshire Cricket Council (1903).

Born in Hessle, Yorkshire, England, Rudston was a right-handed batsman, who scored 631 runs at 20.35, with his best score by far being 164 against Leicestershire in 1904 in only his third first-class match. He scored two other half-centuries, took five catches but did not bowl.

Rudston was born and also died in Hessle, Yorkshire.
