= Horace Perry =

English cricketer

Personal information
- Full name: Horace Thomas Perry
- Born: 29 November 1905; Bedminster, Somerset, England
- Died: 25 December 1962 (aged 57); Kingsdown, Bristol, England
- Batting: Right-handed
- Bowling: Right-arm fast

Domestic team information
- Years: Team
- 1927: Somerset

Career statistics
Competition	FC
Matches	1
Runs scored	9
Batting average	4.50
100s/50s	0/0
Top score	9
Catches/stumpings	0/–
- Source: CricketArchive, 22 December 2015

Horace Thomas Perry (29 November 1905 – 25 December 1962) was a cricketer who played one first-class match for Somerset in 1927. He was born at Bedminster, Bristol.

Perry batted at No 8 in the two Somerset innings of the match against Lancashire at Old Trafford, which Lancashire won in two days. He made nine in the first innings and was out for a duck in the second. Cricket websites agree that he batted right-handed and suggest that he bowled right-handed and fast. However, in his one first-class match, he did not bowl.

Perry died, aged 57, at Kingsdown, Bristol.
