= Horace Phillips (rugby union) =

- Full name: David Horace Phillips
- Born: 24 August 1928 Birchgrove, Swansea, Wales
- Died: 12 December 2009 (aged 81) Sketty, Wales
- School: Dynevor School

Rugby union career
- Position: Wing
International career
Years	Team	Apps	(Points)
1952	Wales	1	(0)

David Horace Phillips (24 August 1928 – 12 December 2009) was a Welsh international rugby union player.

Phillips was born in the Swansea suburb of Birchgrove and attended Dynevor School.

Active in the 1950s, Phillips was a Swansea wing three-quarter, capped once by Wales in the 1952 Five Nations Championship, against France at St Helens. He was in the Swansea side that drew with the visiting All Blacks in 1953, toured Romania with the club in 1954 and held their captaincy during the 1955–56 season.

== See also ==
- List of Wales national rugby union players
