= Horace Mellor =

English cricketer (1851–1942)

Horace Mellor (21 February 1851 – 27 February 1942) was an English cricketer active from 1874 to 1875 who played for Lancashire. He was born in Paddington and died in Castletown, Isle of Man. He appeared in two first-class matches as a righthanded batsman, scoring 28 runs with a highest score of 17.
