= Horace Allen =

Horace Allen may refer to:

- Horace Allen (baseball) (1899–1981), American outfielder in Major League Baseball
- Horace G. Allen (1855–1919), American lawyer and politician
- Horace Newton Allen (1858–1932), American missionary and diplomat
