= Horace Young =

Horace Young may refer to:

- H. Olin Young (1850–1917), politician from the U.S. state of Michigan
- Horace C. Young (1806–1879), American architect and politician from New York
- Horace Alexander Young, African-American saxophonist and flute player
