= FT Sistemas FT-100 Horus =

FT-100 Horus
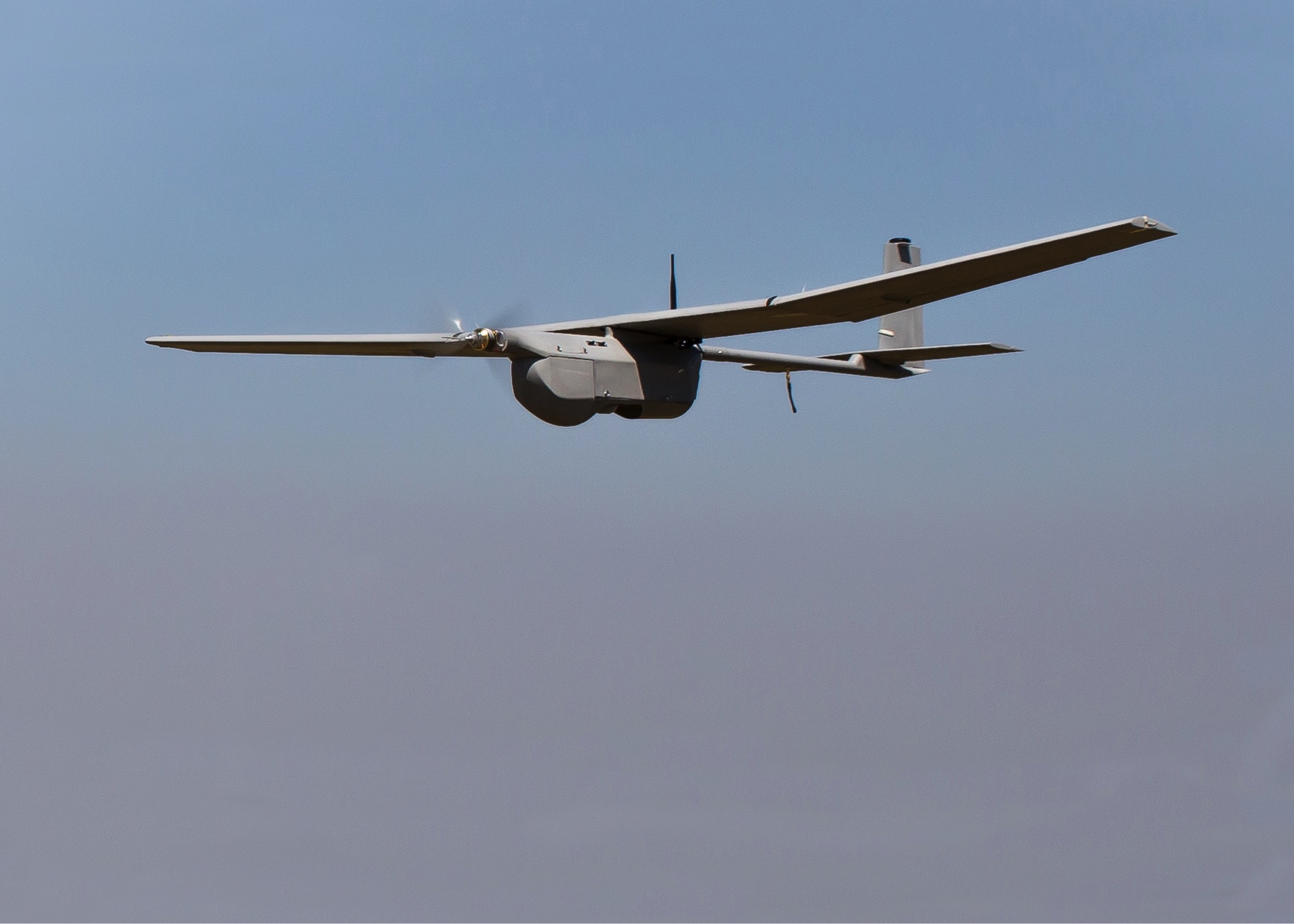

General information
- Type: Unmanned aerial vehicle
- National origin: Brazil
- Manufacturer: FT Sistemas
- Primary users: Brazilian Army Brazilian Navy

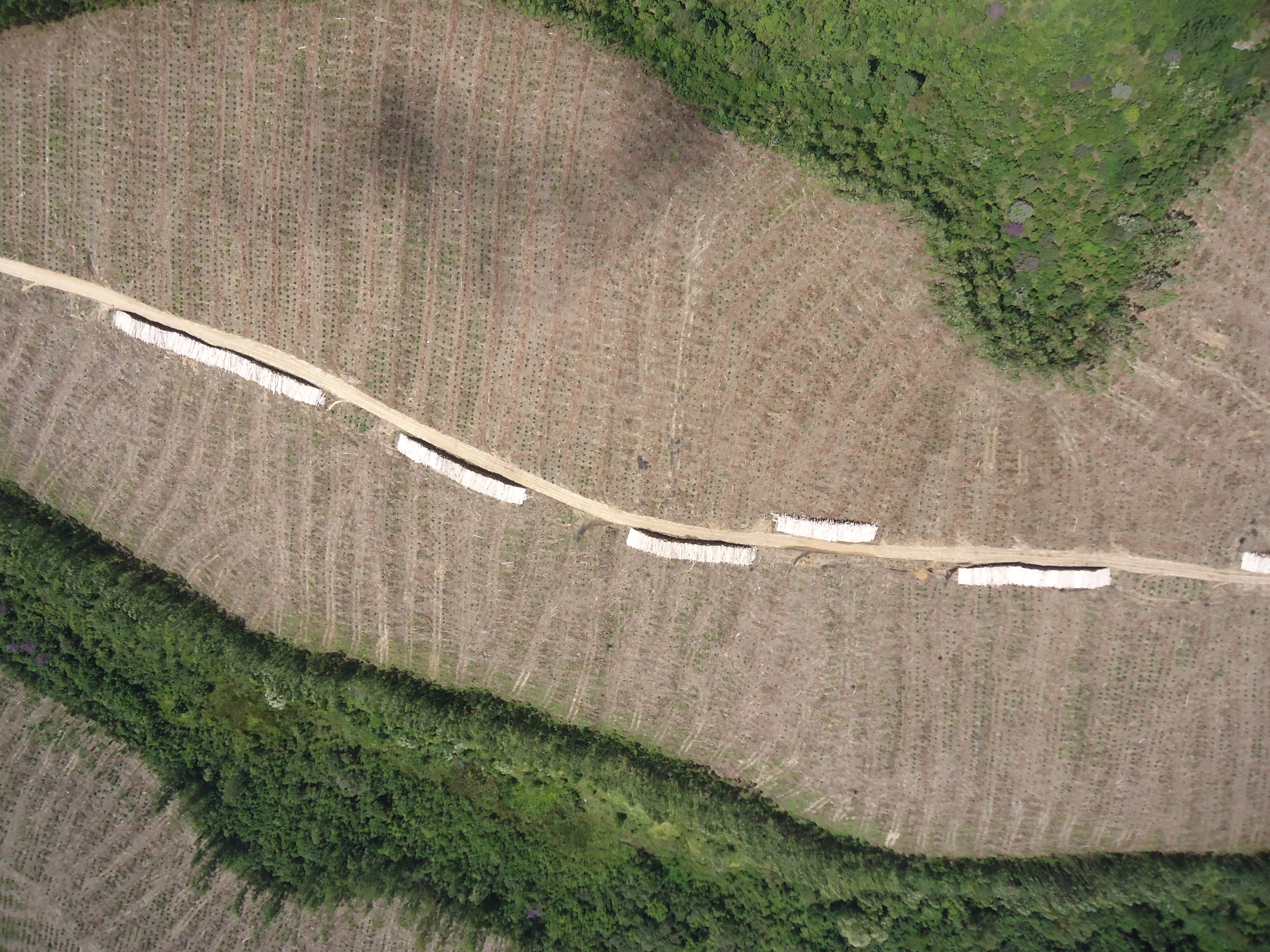
FT-100 Horus aerial work.

The FT-100 Horus is a Brazilian electrical Miniature UAV designed for short-range surveillance designed in conjunction with the Brazilian Army. It has an endurance of 1–2 hours, weighs 6 kg (13 lb) to 8 kg (18 lb), has a 2.7 m (8.9 ft) wingspan and an operational range of 5 nmi (9.3 km) to 8 nmi (15 km). The army's FT-100s were used to carry out surveillance operations during the 2016 Summer Olympic Games in Rio de Janeiro.

FT-100 is the first Brazilian made UAV to have been exported, with three aircraft sold to an undisclosed African military customer. The Brazilian Army operated FT-100 units starting in the first quarter of 2015.
