= Horace Mann Thu-Jaune =

Malagasy politician (born 1963)

Horace Mann Thu-Jaune (born 20 December 1963, in Farafangana) is a Malagasy politician. He is a member of the Senate of Madagascar for Atsinanana
