= Horace Merrick =

English cricketer

Personal information
- Born: 21 December 1887; Bristol
- Died: 16 August 1961 (aged 73); Bristol
- Batting: Right-handed

Domestic team information
- Years: Team
- 1909-1911: Gloucestershire
- Source: Cricinfo, 30 March 2014

Horace Merrick MC (21 December 1887 – 16 August 1961) was an English cricketer, soldier and school teacher.

Merrick attended Bristol Grammar School before going up to Oxford University. He played 12 matches of first-class cricket as a batsman for Gloucestershire between 1909 and 1911. His highest score came in the match against Essex in 1909, when he scored 58 and 23. He became a school teacher, first at Denstone College, then at Clifton College, where he was master-in-charge of cricket.

In the First World War he served as an officer with the Gloucestershire Regiment. He was wounded in action in 1915 and was awarded the Military Cross "for conspicuous gallantry and devotion to duty" in 1917.
