= Horace Wilson =

Horace Wilson may refer to:

- H. H. Wilson (Horace Hayman Wilson, 1786–1860), English Orientalist
- Horace Wilson (professor) (1843–1927), American professor of English who introduced baseball to Japan
- Horace Wilson (politician) (1848–1903), mayor of Winnipeg, Manitoba
- Horace Wilson (cricketer) (1864–1923), Australian cricketer
- Horace Wilson (civil servant) (1882–1972), British government official
