= Horace Judson =

Horace Judson may refer to:

- Horace Freeland Judson (1931–2011), historian of molecular biology
- Horace A. Judson, American educator and academic administrator
- Horace S. Judson (1863–1926), American glove manufacturer and politician from New York
