= Horace (video game) =

2019 video game

- Developers: Paul Helman; Sean Scaplehorn
- Publisher: 505 Games
- Engine: Unity Engine
- Platforms: Microsoft Windows; Nintendo Switch; PlayStation 4; Xbox One
- Release: Microsoft Windows; WW: July 19, 2019; Nintendo Switch; WW: October 21, 2020; PS4, Xbox One; WW: February 28, 2023
- Genres: Platform, Metroidvania
- Mode: Single-player

Horace is a 2019 platform video game developed by British indie developers Paul Helman and Sean Scaplehorn, and published by 505 Games. The game was originally launched for Microsoft Windows on July 19, 2019, with a Nintendo Switch port released on October 21, 2020. The game also released for PlayStation 4 and Xbox One on February 28, 2023. Players control the titular Horace, a sentient robot who is adopted by a wealthy British family. Following a period of dormancy, Horace is reactivated and finds himself searching for a sense of purpose in a war-torn post-apocalyptic world.

The gameplay of Horace primarily features action-adventure and platform game elements, with guided non-linearity as well as utility-gated exploration and progression typical of the Metroidvania subgenre. Certain segments switch between several video game genres, with elements ranging from racing games to fighting games. Horace was met with a generally positive critical reception for both PC and console platforms.

== Gameplay ==
Horace is presented as a story-driven side-scrolling video game with 2D pixel art. In order to complete objectives and progress through the story, players must navigate the game's title character, a sentient robot named Horace, through a labyrinthine series of rooms presented as a platform game. Acquiring key items or ability upgrades for Horace enable players to explore areas that were previously impossible to reach.

The platform gameplay of Horace is characterized by fine control and careful timing, as the player guides Horace into running and jumping over hazardous obstacles like trap-lined ceilings and spike-filled ravines found throughout the game's many levels. Prior to its ending, Horace can be continuously played without triggering a "game over" scenario: whenever Horace dies, he is immediately transported back to the last checkpoint within the same room. Additional orb-like "shields" or hit points collected by the player allow Horace to survive what is otherwise a lethal hit. If the player character dies repeatedly at a particular section, the game adjusts the difficulty in response to the numerous failed attempts to progress by offering additional shields for players to pick up.

Players will encounter numerous mini-games which resemble arcade cabinets that feature fully-playable versions of typical arcade games throughout the game world. While predominantly optional, a few sections of Horace require the successful completion of a mini-game before players are allowed to progress through the story. Minigames may involve gameplay elements such as fighting, shooting, racing, flying sequences, and rhythm action sequences.

An optional objective for players to complete is to have Horace clean up at least 1 million units of rubbish by the game's end. These waste items represent the game's collectible system, which provides an incentive for players to thoroughly explore the in-game world to acquire achievements.

== Development and release ==
Horace was primarily developed by Paul Helman across seven years. He was responsible for the project's art, design, music, gameplay, writing and promotion of the project. Three years after the development of Horace commenced, Helman received some assistance from programmer Sean Scaplehorn, who helped create a game demo for a conference in London which drew the attention of some publisher representatives in attendance. 505 Games eventually approached Helman with a publishing deal; the company assigned Helman a producer and allowed him creative freedom to develop Horace for four years.

Some of the major influences for Horace included Helman's past work experiences with the Die Hard Trilogy as a one-time employee of Probe Entertainment; the development of a video game called Boom TV which was eventually canceled as a result of the September 11 attacks due to the presence of the World Trade Center buildings as a destructible environmental element; and the sights and surroundings of the industrial town of Sittingbourne where Helman resides. The scope and scale of the Final Fantasy role-playing game franchise informed Helman's desire to make an "arty platformer" which gradually expands into a sprawling in-game world. The plot of Horace, a satirical story about a robot who is unwittingly elevated into a prominent public figure and is attempting to reunite with individuals he consider to be his family, is inspired by the story arc of the protagonist of the 1979 film Being There. A self-professed pop culture enthusiast, Helman promoted Horace as a game that appeals to nostalgia: he intentionally seeded numerous cultural references or in-jokes to classical music, cinema and video games throughout the in-game world.

The Windows version of Horace was launched on July 19, 2019. A port for the Nintendo Switch was released on October 21, 2020. A limited physical release for Horace was available through Super Rare's website, limited to a purchase of two copies per person. The release run consisted of 4,000 copies available, with each copy bundled with interior artwork, an exclusive sticker, trading cards, and a full-colour manual.

== Reception ==
Reception

Aggregate score
Aggregator	Score
Metacritic	(PC) 81/100 (NS) 82/100

According to review aggregator Metacritic, both PC and Nintendo Switch versions of Horace has received generally favorable reviews.

On November 28, 2022, Paul Helman received the Love Story Gaming Award for Excellence in Storytelling for his work on Horace.
