= Horace Henry White =

American lawyer

Henry Horace White
- Born: February 7, 1864; Opelousas, Louisiana, U.S.
- Died: October 13, 1946 (aged 82); Alexandria, Louisiana, U.S.
- Resting place: Greenwood Memorial Park
- Education: Vanderbilt University
- Occupations: Lawyer, educator
- Spouse: Fannie Blythe
- Parent(s): B. F. White; Sallie Wynn

Horace Henry White (February 7, 1864 - October 13, 1946) was an American lawyer and educator. He was "one of the leading lawyers" in Louisiana, and the president of the Louisiana State Board of Education.

== Early life ==
White was born on February 7, 1864, in Opelousas, Louisiana. His father was Reverend B. F. White and his mother, Sallie Wynn White.

White attended Vanderbilt University, where he joined the Kappa Alpha Order fraternity in 1883. He graduated from the university, earning a bachelor of arts in 1886 and a bachelor of laws in 1887.

== Career and civic activities ==
White practised the law in Louisiana. He was a partner in Ariail & White, White & Thornton, and Holloman & White. He was appointed as professor of Civil Law at Tulane University Law School in 1906. He authored several legal volumes, including White's Notarial Guide and White's Analytical Index. He became the dean of the bar in Rapides Parish, and he was awarded an honorary membership in the Order of the Coif by its Tulane University chapter in 1938. According to The Town Talk, White became "one of the leading lawyers in the state."

White helped dismantle the Louisiana State Lottery Company. He was active in the Louisiana Democratic Party. He served on the board of trust of his alma mater, Vanderbilt University, from 1908 to 1946. He was the Knight Commander of the Kappa Alpha Order from 1889 to 1891. He served on the Rapides Parish School Board, and as the president of the Louisiana State Board of Education.

== Personal life and death ==
White married Fannie Blythe in 1887. They had nine children, and they resided at 1806 Lee Street in Alexandria, Louisiana. White taught the Bible at the First Methodist Church of Alexandria. He was a Mason and an Odd Fellow.

White died on October 13, 1946, in Alexandria, and he was buried in Greenwood Memorial Park.
