= Horace Sprott =

Horace Sprott (February 2, 1899 – c.1992) was an American songster and harmonica player in Alabama who was recorded in the 1950s.

== Biography ==
Sprott was the son of a former slave, Bessie Ford, and was born on the Sprott Plantation in Perry County, Alabama. He took his name from his birthplace. He was unsure of his year of birth, which was not recorded at the time; writer Frederic Ramsey thought that he had been born no later than 1890, but researchers Bob Eagle and Eric S. LeBlanc give 1899 on the basis of his entry in the 1930 US Census.

He left home in his early teens, and for several years was incarcerated after being convicted of assaulting his girlfriend. After his release he worked in various menial jobs in Louisiana and Mississippi, before eventually returning to Alabama and marrying. He taught himself guitar and harmonica, and sang a variety of work songs, spirituals and blues. In 1954, researcher and writer Frederic Ramsey encountered Sprott in Marion, Alabama, and was impressed with Sprott's performing style - often singing unaccompanied - and repertoire. He recorded seven sessions with Sprott, released as field recordings on volumes 2, 3, and 4 of the Music of the South series by Folkways Records in 1955. Sprott performed on TV in 1956, but never maintained a professional musical career. He also featured heavily in Ramsey's account of his field trips in the South, published as Been Here and Gone in 1960.

Sprott was still living in Marion in 1990, but is thought to have died in the early 1990s.
