= Horace Hiller =

American politician

Horace Hiller (c. 1844—1898) was a businessman in Los Angeles, California, during the 19th century and served on the city's governing body, the Common Council. He died after he was struck by a falling window frame as he walked beneath construction work on a downtown building.

Hiller was born in about 1844 in Hudson, New York, the son of Henry and Henrietta Winans Hiller. He was married in 1867 to Abby Pearce, and they had one daughter and two sons. Hiller also had two brothers, Sidney and Henry, who survived him when he was killed on May 20, 1898. Interment was at Rosedale Cemetery.

Hiller came to Los Angeles via the Southern railroad route in 1870 and "became engaged in the lumber business." He was president and general manager of the Los Angeles Lumber Company and was a director of the California Sewer Pipe Company. Hiller was elected on May 6, 1886, to represent the 5th Ward on the Los Angeles Common Council and was reelected to a term ending on December 10, 1888.

A coroner's jury found that Hiller's death was due to workers being "negligent and grossly careless" when they were handling a 8x15-foot window frame they were placing in the Henne Building on Third Street and it fell to the sidewalk, striking Hiller and breaking his skull.

The family home was at 147 West 24th Street, in today's South Los Angeles district.

== References and notes ==
Access to the Los Angeles Times links may require the use of a library card.
