= Horace Jones =

Horace Jones may refer to:

- Horace Jones (architect) (1819–1887), English architect
- Horace Jones (American football) (born 1949), American football defensive end
- Horace A. Jones (1906–2001), horse trainer
- Horace Jones (footballer), English football wing half
- Horace Jones, a character in the film Angels in Disguise
