= Horace Clark (cricketer) =

English cricketer

Horace George Clark (23 January 1889 – 28 February 1967) was an English cricketer active from 1920 to 1923 who played for Essex. He was born in West Ham and died in Epping. He appeared in two first-class matches and scored 13 runs.
