= Horace Ford =

Horace Ford may refer to:

- Hod Ford (1897–1977), baseball player
- Horace A. Ford (1822–1880), target archer
