= Horace Sweeney Oakley =

American lawyer

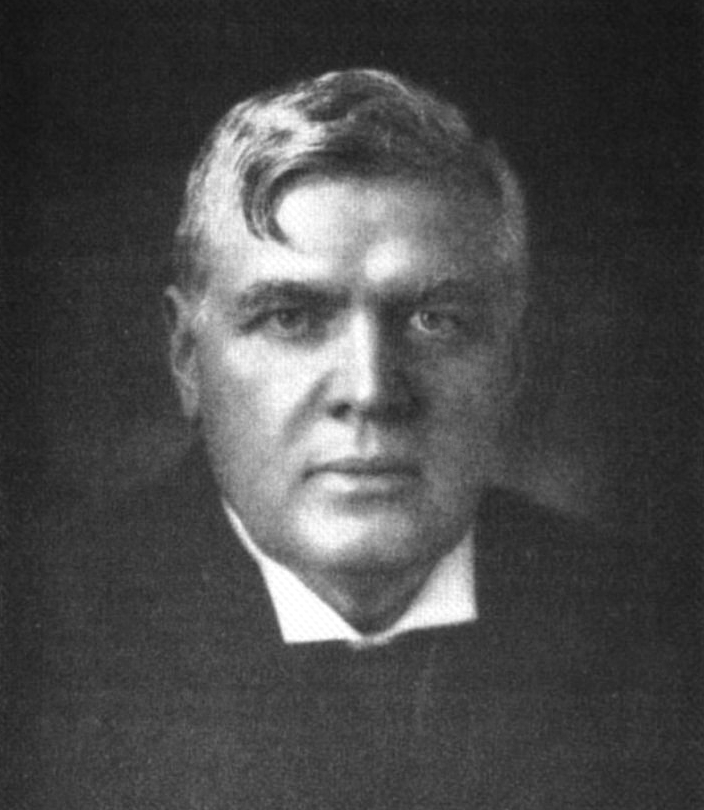
- Born: June 2, 1861; Prescott, Wisconsin
- Died: December 15, 1929 (aged 68); Conte Blancamano, Atlantic Ocean
- Burial place: Forest Hill Cemetery
- Education: University of Michigan
- Occupation(s): Lawyer, scholar, philanthropist

Horace Sweeney Oakley (1861–1929) was a Chicago lawyer, scholar, and philanthropist. He was as a trustee to cultural institutions throughout Chicago (namely the Newberry Library, the Art Institute of Chicago, the Orchestral Association, and the American School of Classical Studies at Athens.

== Biography ==
Horace Sweeney Oakley was born in Prescott, Wisconsin on June 2, 1861. He began his career as a lawyer in Chicago after earning his J.D. from the University of Michigan in 1883. In Chicago, he worked at the Wood and Oakley law firm, which specialized in managing bonds.

While working as a lawyer, Oakley continued to write about classical studies, Franciscan missionaries, and peaceful conflict resolution. His writings and lectures on peace landed him a spot on President Woodrow Wilson's peace committee. This position led to opportunities to serve in other areas, and he resigned the committee to join the American Red Cross Commission to Greece.

In the late 1910s, In addition to his foreign service and scholarship, he was known for his leadership in the Chicago Literary Club, the Law Club, and the Illinois Bar Association. He was a trustee of the Newberry Library.

Oakley died from heart disease on the ocean liner Conte Blancamano on December 15, 1929, while en route from New York City to Naples, Italy. He was cremated, and his ashes were buried at Forest Hill Cemetery in Madison, Wisconsin.
