= Horace Belshaw =

New Zealand economist, university professor (1898–1962)

Horace Belshaw (9 February 1898 – 20 March 1962) was a New Zealand teacher, economist and university professor. He was born in Wigan, Lancashire, England on 9 February 1898.

In 1935, he was awarded the King George V Silver Jubilee Medal.
