= Marclay =

Marclay is a surname. Notable people with the surname include:

- Christian Marclay (born 1955), Swiss-American artist
- Sergio Marclay (born 1982), Argentine footballer
