= Atlético de Rafaela =

Argentine sports club

- Full name: Asociación Mutual Social y Deportiva Atlético de Rafaela
- Nickname: La Crema
- Founded: 13 January 1907; 119 years ago
- Ground: Nuevo Monumental; Rafaela, Santa Fe Province
- Capacity: 20,660
- Chairman: Silvio Fontanini
- Manager: Iván Juárez
- League: Primera Nacional
- 2024: Primera Nacional Zone B, 18th
- Website: atleticorafaela.com.ar
| Home colours | Away colours | Third colours |

Asociación Mutual Social y Deportiva Atlético de Rafaela, known simply as Atlético de Rafaela, is an Argentine sports club based in the city of Rafaela, in Santa Fe Province. The club is mostly known for its professional football team, that competes in Primera Nacional, the second division of Argentine football league system. It is popularly known in Argentina and other South American countries for its nickname "La Crema".

The club owns the Autódromo Ciudad de Rafaela. Apart from football, the other sports and activities practised at the institution are basketball, chess, field hockey, artistic gymnastics, paddle tennis, roller skating, skeet shooting, swimming, tennis and volleyball.

== History ==
Under the name "Club Atlético Argentino de Rafaela", the club was founded in the city of Rafaela, Santa Fe Province in 1907. In 1915 the name was changed to "Club Atlético de Rafaela". The Monumental de Barrio Alberdi concrete stadium was erected in 1951.

The club was turned into a non-profit organization in 1988, and renamed Asociación Mutual Social y Deportiva Atlético de Rafaela ("Social and Sport Association Rafaela Athletic"). Only a year later Rafaela reached the second division after defeating Atlético Ledesma by 3–0 with goals scored by López (20', 30') and Poelman (35').

Atlético de Rafaela played in the second division for 14 years until the team won the Apertura 2002 and the Clausura 2003 to finally reach the first division. After losing the promoción against Huracán de Tres Arroyos, Atlético de Rafaela was relegated to the second division again.

The following season Atlético lost its chance to return to the first division, after losing the promoción, against Argentinos Juniors.

In 2009 Rafaela earned another chance to return to the Primera División via a playoff against Gimnasia y Esgrima de La Plata. After winning the first final 3–0, Rafaela lost the second match by the same score (0–3) and had to stay in the second division once again.

Atlético de Rafaela fans are referred to as Cremosos or Celestes, and the people that follows the team everywhere are known as La Barra de los Trapos .

The club also has an important car racing circuit since 1919, which hosts many competitions including the Turismo Carretera (since 1941) and the TC 2000 (since 1983).

On the 21st of May 2011, after defeating Atlético Tucumán 2–0 with goals scored by Carniello and Aldana, they earned a place back in the first division for the 2011–12 season.

== Players ==
=== Current squad ===
As of 12 August 2026.

Note: Flags indicate national team as defined under FIFA eligibility rules; some limited exceptions apply. Players may hold more than one non-FIFA nationality.

| No. | Pos. | Nation | Player |
|---|---|---|---|
| 1 | GK | ARG | Mayco Bergia |
| 12 | GK | ARG | Ramiro Martínez (footballer) |
| 3 | DF | ARG | Nicolás Ramos |
| 4 | DF | ARG | Agustín Solveyra |
| 13 | DF | ARG | Gabriel Fernández |
| 14 | DF | ARG | Juan Galetto |
| 23 | DF | ARG | Ulises Yegros (loan from Ferro) |
| 34 | DF | ARG | Ariel González (loan from Aldosivi) |
| 22 | DF | ARG | Luciano Echeverría (loan from Tucumán) |
| 6 | DF | ARG | Enzo Wuliger |
| 16 | DF | ARG | Roque Ramírez |
| 66 | DF | ARG | Lorenzo Moscoloni (loan from Rosario Central) |
| 2 | DF | ARG | Leonardo Flores |
| 5 | MF | ARG | Facundo Soloa |
| 15 | MF | ARG | Valentino Arro |
| 8 | MF | ARG | Matías Morello |
| 18 | MF | ARG | Juan Capurro |
| — | MF | ARG | Damiano Jaime |

| No. | Pos. | Nation | Player |
|---|---|---|---|
| 16 | MF | ARG | Thomas Rojas |
| 20 | MF | ARG | Marcos Fernández |
| 10 | MF | ARG | Juan Cavallaro |
| 21 | FW | ARG | Agustín Obando (loan from Boca Juniors) |
| 19 | FW | ARG | Ijiel Protti |
| — | FW | ARG | Federico Jourdan (loan from Kalamata) |
| 9 | FW | ARG | Lucas Albertengo |
| 7 | FW | ARG | Nahuel Cainelli |
| — | FW | ARG | Mauro Quiroga |
| — | FW | ARG | Martiniano Moreno |
| — | FW | ARG | Alexis Rodríguez (loan from La Guaira) |
| 11 | FW | ARG | Gabriel Esparza (loan from Temperley) |

=== Out on loan ===
Note: Flags indicate national team as defined under FIFA eligibility rules; some limited exceptions apply. Players may hold more than one non-FIFA nationality.

| No. | Pos. | Nation | Player |
|---|---|---|---|
| — | DF | ARG | Roque Ramírez (at River Plate Montevideo until 31 December 2022) |

=== Notable players ===
To appear in this section a player must have either played at least 50 games for the club, set a club record or played for their national team.

- (Argentina) Gustavo Alfaro (1988–92)
- (Argentina) Gabriel Schürrer (1989–90)
- (Argentina) Gustavo Semino (1996–97), (1998–99), (2000–01), (2004–05), (2007)
- (Argentina) Gonzalo del Bono (1997–99), (2000–06), (2007–08) (Note: Maximum goal scorer of the club with 56 goals.)
- (Argentina) Raúl "Speedy" González (1997–00)
- (Argentina) Lucas Bovaglio (1998–00), (2001–04), (2006), (2009–11), (2012–14)
- (Paraguay) Carlos Bonet (1998–02) (Note: Foreign player with highest number of appearances (124 matches) with the club.)
- (Uruguay) Carlos Goyen (1992–95) (Note: Foreign player with second highest number or appearances (98 matches) with the club.)
- (Argentina) Hugo Barrientos (2000–04)
- (Argentina) Franco Mendoza (2000–05)
- (Uganda) Ibrahim Sekagya (2001–02) (Note: Foreign player with third highest number or appearances (35 matches) with the club.)
- (Argentina) Darío Gandín (2001–04), (2011–13)
- (Argentina) Iván Juárez (2001–04), (2005–11), (2011–13) (Note: Highest number of appearances with the team with 312 games played)
- (Argentina) Ezequiel Medrán (2001–04)
- (Argentina) Carlos Araujo (2002–04)
- (Argentina) Marcelo Barovero (2002–07)
- (Argentina) Leonardo Di Lorenzo (2003–04) (Note: Highest number of appearances with in the Primera División Argentina, with 35 games.)
- (Argentina) Sergio Marclay (2004–05), (2006–07), (2009–10)
- (Argentina) Lucas Aveldaño (2005–08)
- (Argentina) Claudio Bieler (2006–07)
- (Uruguay) Martín del Campo (2006–07) (Note: Foreign player with fourth highest number of appearances (35 matches) with the club.)
- (Argentina) Alejandro Faurlín (2007)
- (Argentina) Cesar Carignano (2010–11), (2012–13) (Note: Top goalscorer of the Primera B Nacional 2010–2011 season, with 21 goals.)
- (Argentina) Rodrigo Depetris (2009–2015) (Note: Scored the goal of the victory against Colón in a match tiebreak.)

== Managers ==
- (Argentina) Mário Imbelloni (1970)
- (Argentina) Horacio Bongiovanni (Dec 21, 1988–??)
- (Argentina) Francisco Calabrese (1992–??)
- (Argentina) Roberto Rogel (1993–94)
- (Argentina) Ángel Bargas (19??)
- (Argentina) Carlos Biasutto (19??)
- (Argentina) Gustavo Alfaro (1992–95), (1998–00)
- (Argentina) Jorge Ghiso (Nov 12, 1997–98), (2001–02), (2006–07)
- (Argentina) Oscar Blanco (2002 – Nov 4, 2003)
- (Argentina) Alejandro Zurbriggen (interim) (Nov 9, 2003)
- (Argentina) Osvaldo Piazza (Nov 11, 2003 – July 4, 2004)
- (Argentina) Omar Labruna (interim) (Aug 16, 2004)
- (Argentina) José Luis Brown (2004–05)
- (Argentina) Jorge Ginarte (April 21, 2005 – Oct 18, 2005)
- (Argentina) Óscar Garré (2005–06)
- (Argentina) Juan Amador Sánchez (June 14, 2007–08)
- (Argentina) Carlos Marcelo Fuentes (June 23, 2008 – June 30, 2009)
- (Argentina) Carlos Trullet (2009 – March 12, 2012)
- (Argentina) Rúben Darío Forestello (March 13, 2012 – Nov 18, 2012)
- (Argentina) Victor Bottaniz (interim) (Oct 6, 2012 – Dec 3, 2012)
- (Argentina) Jorge Burruchaga (Dec 3, 2012 – May 26, 2014), (Jan 4, 2016 – March 24, 2016)
- (Argentina) Roberto Sensini (June 10, 2014 – April 4, 2015)
- (Argentina) Leonardo Astrada (April 14, 2015 – Nov 8, 2015)
- (Argentina) Juan Manuel Llop (March 28, 2016 – June 25, 2017)
- (Argentina) Lucas Bovaglio (July 10, 2017 – current)

== Institutional ==
=== Current Board ===
Executive Board 2017

- President: Eduardo Gays
- 1st Vice-president: Carlos Eguiazú
- 2nd Vice-president: Adrián Steinaker

=== List of all-time chairmen ===
- Eduardo Ripamonti (1907–1910)
- Alfredo Miles (1911)
- Eloy Gaitán (1912)
- Eusebio Forns (1913)
- Calesancio Stoffel (1914)
- Virgilio Fanti (1915)
- Ermindo Bertolaccini (1916)
- Juan Pablo Fiorillo (1917)
- Virgilio Fanti (1918)
- Octavio Zóbboli (1919–1921)
- Ermindo Bertolaccini (1922)
- Santiago Rodríguez (1923–1924)
- Ermindo Bertolaccini (1925)
- Bernardo Strubia (1926)
- Santiago Rodríguez (1927)
- Miguel Villabrica (1928)
- Ernesto Remonda (1928)
- José Gutiérrez (1929–1930)
- Pablo Comtesse (1931)
- Carlos Casabella (1932)
- Rinaldo Ripamonti (1933)
- Juan Cagliero (1934)
- José Gutiérrez (1935)
- Carmelo Sáenz (1936)
- Juan Báscolo (1936–1937)
- Carmelo Sáenz (1943)
- Juvenal Viotti (1944)
- Luis Radicci (1945–1946)
- Ricardo Santi (1947–1948)
- Luis Radicci (1949)
- Juan Cagliero (1950)
- Juan Báscolo (1951–1954)
- Juan Berzero (1955–1958)
- Ricardo Santi (1959–1960)
- Néstor Ruatta (1961–1964)
- Bernardo Kuschnir (1965–1968)
- Eduardo Ricotti (1969–1972)
- Aníbal Alberto (1972)
- David Alujes (1973–1976)
- Edison Valsagna (1977)
- Isidro Dellasanta (1977–1980)
- Egidio Bocco (1981–1989)
- Silvio Fontanet (1990–1996)
- Gabriel Gaggiotti (1997–2001)
- Ricardo Tettamantti (2002–2014)
- Homero Ingaramo (2014-2016)
- Eduardo Gays (2016-2020)
- Silvio Fontanini (2021-2023)
- Diego Kurganoff (2023-current)

== Honours ==
=== National ===
- Primera B Nacional (2): 2002–03, 2010–11
- Torneo del Interior (1): 1988–89

=== Regional ===
- Liga Rafaelina (17): 1923, 1950, 1951, 1953, 1964, 1965, 1973, 1975, 1976, 1977, 1981, 1982, 1983, 1987, 1994, 1996, 2013

=== Friendly ===
- Copa Ciudad de Rosario (1): 2012
- Copa Centenario Patronato de Paraná (1): 2014
