= Sergio Marclay =

Argentine footballer

Personal information
- Full name: Sergio Fabián Marclay
- Date of birth: 29 January 1982 (age 44)
- Place of birth: Quilmes, Argentina
- Height: 1.70 m (5 ft 7 in)
- Position: Forward

Youth career
- Quilmes

Senior career*
Years	Team	Apps	(Gls)
1998–2004	Quilmes	51	(7)
2004–2005	Atlético Rafaela	27	(6)
2005–2006	Everton	19	(1)
2006–2007	Atlético Rafaela	33	(5)
2007–2009	Quilmes	24	(6)
2009–2010	Atlético Rafaela	15	(1)
2010–2011	Gimnasia de Jujuy	14	(0)
2011–2012	Temperley	31	(1)
2012–2014	Gimnasia de Mendoza	42	(9)
2014–2016	Argentino de Quilmes	56	(26)
2016–2018	Sportivo Italiano	57	(12)
2018	Argentino de Quilmes	18	(1)

Managerial career
- 2022: Quilmes (women) (youth)
- * Club domestic league appearances and goals

Sergio Fabián Marclay (born January 29, 1982, in Quilmes, Argentina) is an Argentine former association football forward.

== Teams ==
- (Argentina) Quilmes 1998–2004
- (Argentina) Atlético Rafaela 2004–2005
- (Chile) Everton 2005–2006
- (Argentina) Atlético Rafaela 2006–2007
- (Argentina) Quilmes 2007–2009
- (Argentina) Atlético Rafaela 2009–2010
- (Argentina) Gimnasia y Esgrima de Jujuy 2010–2011
- (Argentina) Temperley 2011–2012
- (Argentina) Gimnasia y Esgrima de Mendoza 2012–2014
- (Argentina) Argentino de Quilmes 2014–2016
- (Argentina) Sportivo Italiano 2016–2018
- (Argentina) Argentino de Quilmes 2018

== Managerial career ==
In 2022, Marclay was appointed the coach for the under-18's and the under-14's of the Quilmes women's team. Later, he joined the technical department of the club.
