= COVID-19 vaccination in Argentina =

Plan to immunize against COVID-19

COVID-19 vaccination campaign in Argentina
- Date: 29 December 2020 – present
- Location: Argentina
- Cause: COVID-19 pandemic in Argentina
- Target: Immunisation of Argentines against COVID-19

The COVID-19 vaccination program in Argentina is an ongoing effort of mass immunization. Vaccination against COVID-19 began in Argentina on 29 December 2020 aiming at health professionals. Argentina struck a deal with the United Kingdom in November 2020 for a British made vaccine produced by the pharmaceutical company AstraZeneca and the University of Oxford. The vaccines are part of a deal where Argentina received 22.4 million doses. During the first week, 39,599 doses were applied to health professionals.

On 18 February 2021, vaccination on citizens aged over 70 began in the Province of Buenos Aires. Schools, among other sites, were used as temporary vaccination centres.

== Background ==
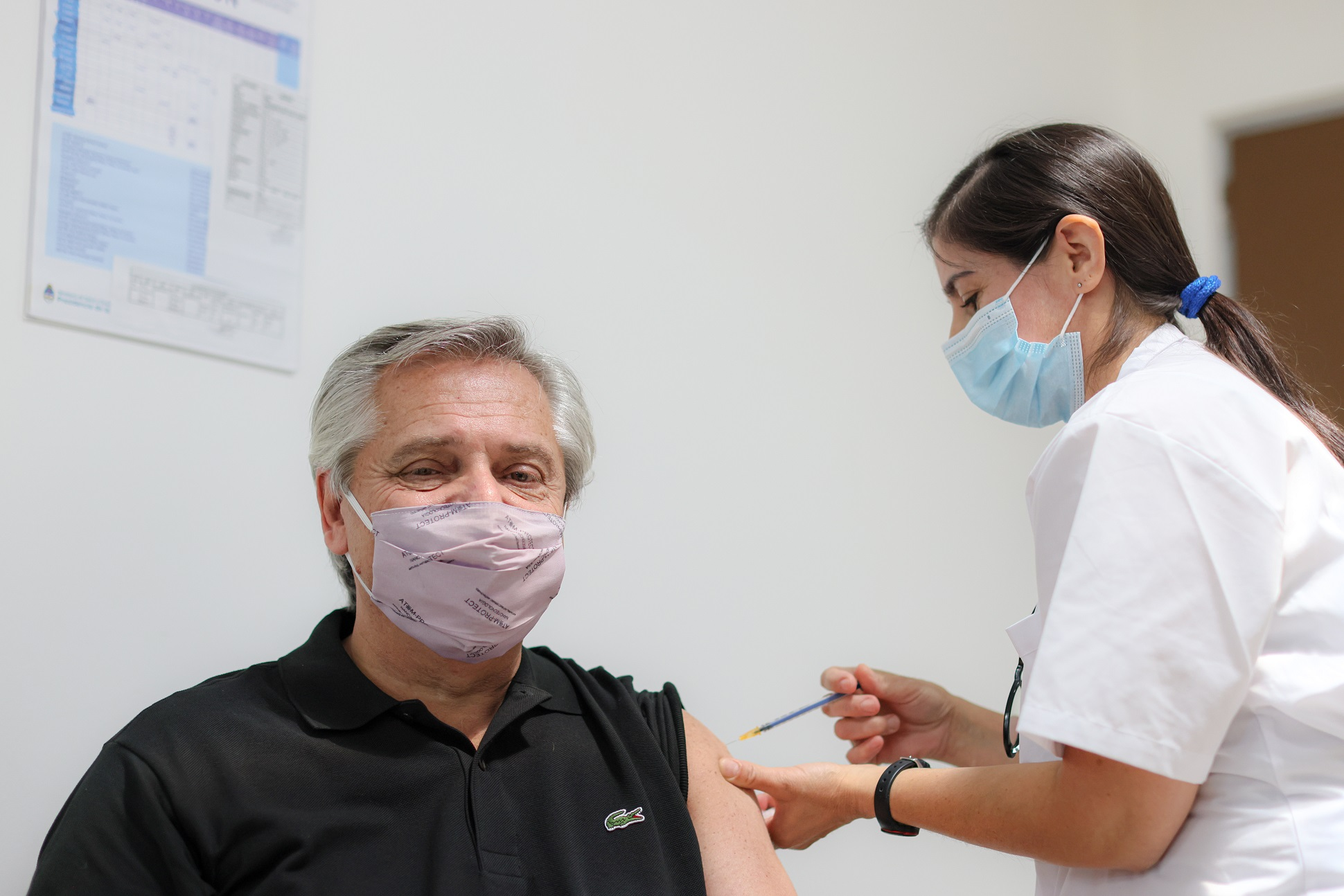
Argentinian president Alberto Fernández receiving the Sputnik V vaccine on 21 January 2021.

During the first days of November, the government announced that will acquire during December 2020 and January 2021, 25 million of doses from the Russian vaccine Sputnik V after it would enter phase III. Other vaccines such as the developed by University of Oxford and AstraZeneca, Pfizer, and China were also announced to be acquired eventually.

On 22 December the flight that would bring the first doses of the Sputnik V vaccine to the country left for Moscow, after negotiations began in early December. 300,000 doses arrived on 24 December, with the vaccination campaign beginning on 29 December. The governor of the province of Buenos Aires, Axel Kicillof, was among the first to receive the vaccine. One day later, the AZD1222 vaccine developed by University of Oxford and AstraZeneca was also approved in the country.

On 29 May 2021, health minister Carla Vizzotti met with Cuban president Miguel Díaz-Canel to discuss the possibility of distribution of the still unapproved Cuban-made vaccine SOBERANA 02.

On July 17, 2021, 3.5 million doses of Moderna vaccines arrived at Argentina as part of donation from the United States. Before that, on July 9, 2021, Argentina announced that it had procured 20 million doses from Moderna on its supply deal.

The European Investment Bank is collaborating with the Argentinian government to provide the country with $100 million to assist in the acquisition of COVID-19 vaccinations and to deploy vaccination campaigns.

== Vaccines on order ==
Vaccine	Approval	Deployment
Pfizer–BioNTech	Yes	Yes
Oxford–AstraZeneca	Yes	Yes
Sputnik V	Yes	Yes
Sinopharm BIBP	Yes	Yes
Moderna	Yes	Yes
Bharat Biotech	Yes	No
CanSino	Yes	No

== Vaccines in trial stage ==
Vaccine	Type (technology)	Phase I	Phase II	Phase III
CureVac	RNA	Completed	Completed	In progress
ReiThera	Viral vector	Completed	Completed	In progress
