= Quilmes Atlético Club (women) =

Quilmes
- Full name: Quilmes Atlético Club
- Nickname: Las Cerveceras (The Brewers)
- Founded: 28 August 2020; 6 years ago
- Ground: Alsina y Lora, Quilmes, Greater Buenos Aires
- Chairman: Christian Sterli
- Manager: Fernando Chiappino
- League: Primera División C
Home colours	Away colours

Quilmes Atlético Club Women is the women's association football section of the homonymous club based in the city of Quilmes, in Greater Buenos Aires. The team was established in 2020.

They play their home games at the youth football complex, known as "Alsina y Lora", where the junior teams also play their games.

== History ==
=== Formation ===
The women's football section of Quilmes was established on 28 August 2020, when the club began registration for the test of players of the professional team, which would begin to participate in the Primera División C in 2021. Due to the COVID-19 pandemic in Argentina, the said tests would only be carried out between 23 and 25 November.

=== First match ===
Quilmes played their first two friendly matches against Asociación Nueva Alianza (team from La Plata). The first match ended 1-1, with a goal from Mía González who had entered minutes before. In the second game, Las Cerveceras were defeated 2-1 with a goal from Florencia Cristaldo.
