= Gonzalo del Bono =

Argentine footballer (born 1981)

Personal information
- Date of birth: 8 February 1981 (age 45)
- Place of birth: Rafaela, Argentina
- Height: 1.77 m (5 ft 10 in)
- Position: Forward

Senior career*
Years	Team	Apps	(Gls)
1997–1999	Atlético de Rafaela	47	(13)
1999–2000	River Plate		
2000–2006	Atlético de Rafaela	154	(39)
2007–2008	Atlético de Rafaela	24	(7)
2009–2010	Crucero del Norte	16	(7)
2010	Atlético San Jorge	7	(2)
2011	9 de Julio de Rafaela	15	(10)
2011–2012	Crucero del Norte	23	(4)
2012–2014	9 de Julio de Rafaela	28	(11)

Managerial career
- 2021–2022: Atlético de Rafaela
- * Club domestic league appearances and goals

Gonzalo del Bono (born 8 February 1981) is an Argentine association football forward currently playing for 9 de Julio de Rafaela of the Torneo Argentino B in Argentina.

== Teams ==
- (Argentina) Atlético Rafaela 1997–1999
- (Argentina) River Plate 1999–2000
- (Argentina) Atlético Rafaela 2000–2006
- (Spain) Xerez 2006–2007
- (Argentina) Atlético Rafaela 2007–2008
- (Argentina) Crucero del Norte 2009–2010
- (Argentina) Atlético San Jorge 2010
- (Argentina) 9 de Julio de Rafaela 2011
- (Argentina) Crucero del Norte 2011–2012
- (Argentina) 9 de Julio de Rafaela 2012–
