= Martiniano Moreno =

Argentine footballer

Personal information
- Full name: Martiniano Moreno Díaz
- Date of birth: 14 March 2003 (age 23)
- Place of birth: General Villegas, Argentina
- Height: 1.78 m (5 ft 10 in)
- Position: Striker

Team information
- Current team: Atlético Rafaela

Youth career
- Atlético Villegas
- 2020–2023: Estudiantes LP

Senior career*
Years	Team	Apps	(Gls)
2023–2024	Estudiantes LP	9	(0)
2024	→ Guillermo Brown (loan)	17	(0)
2025	Deportes Santa Cruz	18	(8)
2026–	Atlético Rafaela	5	(2)
- * Club domestic league appearances and goals as of 18:31, 27 March 2026 (UTC)

Martiniano Moreno Díaz (born 14 March 2003) is an Argentine professional footballer who plays as a striker for Atlético Rafaela.

== Career ==
Born in General Villegas, Argentina, Moreno was trained at Atlético Villegas before joining Estudiantes de La Plata in 2020. He was promoted to the first team in 2023 and made his professional debut in the 3–1 loss against River Plate for the Argentine Primera División on 15 July of the same year. In 2024, he was loaned out to Guillermo Brown.

As a free agent, Moreno moved abroad and signed with Chilean club Deportes Santa Cruz in February 2025.

Back to Argentina, Moreno joined Atlético Rafaela in January 2026.
