= Oscar Carniello =

Argentine footballer (born 1988)

Personal information
- Full name: Oscar Matías Carniello
- Date of birth: 18 September 1988 (age 38)
- Place of birth: Vila, Argentina
- Height: 1.77 m (5 ft 10 in)
- Position: Centre back

Team information
- Current team: Newbery

Youth career
- –2008: Atlético de Rafaela

Senior career*
| Years | Team | Apps | (Gls) |
| 2008–2013 | Atlético de Rafaela | 152 | (13) |
| 2013–2014 | Colón | 17 | (0) |
| 2014 | Everton | 6 | (0) |
| 2014–2015 | San Martín | 4 | (0) |
| 2016–2018 | Atlético de Rafaela | 29 | (1) |
| 2018–2019 | Boca Unidos | 19 | (1) |
| 2019–2022 | Birkirkara | 59 | (3) |
| 2022–2023 | Marsaxlokk | 14 | (1) |
| 2023– | Newbery | | |
- * Club domestic league appearances and goals as of 25 June 2023

Oscar Matías Carniello (born 18 September 1988) is an Argentine professional footballer who plays as a defender for Newbery.

== Career ==
=== Club ===
Carniello's career began with Primera B Nacional club Atlético de Rafaela in 2008, he made 61 appearances and scored 5 goals in his first two seasons with Rafaela. In his third season, 2010–11, Carniello scored 4 goals in 31 games as the club won promotion to the 2011–12 Argentine Primera División. In July 2013, Carniello departed Rafaela to join fellow Primera División side Colón. 17 appearances followed prior to him leaving to sign for Chilean Primera División team Everton. However, he participated in just six matches for Everton before returning to Argentina to join San Martín in 2014 and subsequently won promotion from Primera B Nacional. Two years later, in July 2016, Carniello rejoined Atlético de Rafaela.

== Career statistics ==
=== Club ===
As of 11 January 2017.

Club statistics
| Club | Season | League | | | Cup (Note: Includes the Copa Argentina and Copa Chile.) | | League Cup | | Continental | | Other | | Total | |
| Club | Season | Division | Apps | Goals | Apps | Goals | Apps | Goals | Apps | Goals | Apps | Goals | Apps | Goals |
|---|---|---|---|---|---|---|---|---|---|---|---|---|---|---|
| Atlético de Rafaela | 2008–09 | Primera B Nacional | 25 | 1 | 0 | 0 | 0 | 0 | — | | 0 | 0 | 25 | 1 |
| Atlético de Rafaela | 2009–10 | Primera B Nacional | 36 | 4 | 0 | 0 | 0 | 0 | — | | 0 | 0 | 36 | 4 |
| Atlético de Rafaela | 2010–11 | Primera B Nacional | 31 | 4 | 0 | 0 | 0 | 0 | — | | 0 | 0 | 31 | 4 |
| Atlético de Rafaela | 2011–12 | Argentine Primera División | 35 | 2 | 1 | 0 | 0 | 0 | — | | 0 | 0 | 36 | 2 |
| Atlético de Rafaela | 2012–13 | Argentine Primera División | 25 | 2 | 1 | 0 | 0 | 0 | — | | 0 | 0 | 26 | 2 |
| Atlético de Rafaela | Total | | 152 | 13 | 2 | 0 | 0 | 0 | — | | 0 | 0 | 154 | 13 |
| Colón | 2013–14 | Argentine Primera División | 17 | 0 | 0 | 0 | 0 | 0 | — | | 0 | 0 | 17 | 0 |
| Colón | Total | | 17 | 0 | 0 | 0 | 0 | 0 | — | | 0 | 0 | 17 | 0 |
| Everton | 2013–14 | Chilean Primera División | 6 | 0 | 0 | 0 | 0 | 0 | — | | 0 | 0 | 6 | 0 |
| Everton | Total | | 6 | 0 | 0 | 0 | 0 | 0 | — | | 0 | 0 | 6 | 0 |
| San Martín | 2014 | Primera B Nacional | 3 | 0 | 1 | 0 | 0 | 0 | — | | 0 | 0 | 4 | 0 |
| San Martín | 2015 | Argentine Primera División | 1 | 0 | 0 | 0 | 0 | 0 | — | | 0 | 0 | 1 | 0 |
| San Martín | Total | | 4 | 0 | 1 | 0 | 0 | 0 | — | | 0 | 0 | 5 | 0 |
| Atlético de Rafaela | 2016–17 | Argentine Primera División | 6 | 0 | 1 | 0 | 0 | 0 | — | | 0 | 0 | 7 | 0 |
| Atlético de Rafaela | Total | | 6 | 0 | 1 | 0 | 0 | 0 | — | | 0 | 0 | 7 | 0 |
| Career total | | | 185 | 13 | 4 | 0 | 0 | 0 | — | | 0 | 0 | 189 | 13 |

== Honours ==
=== Club ===
Atlético de Rafaela

- Primera B Nacional: 2010–11
