= Horacio Bongiovanni =

Argentine former footballer

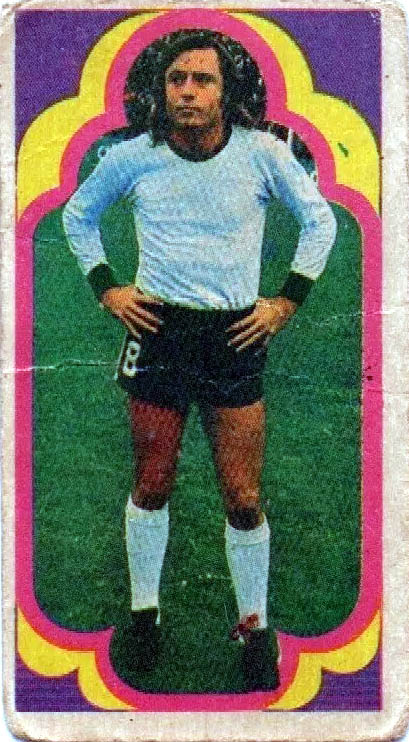

Personal information
- Date of birth: 8 August 1950 (age 76)
- Position: Midfielder

Senior career*
Years	Team	Apps	(Gls)
- Boca Juniors
- * Club domestic league appearances and goals

Horacio Bongiovanni (born 8 August 1950) is an Argentine former footballer who played as a midfielder.
