= COVID-19 pandemic in Argentina =

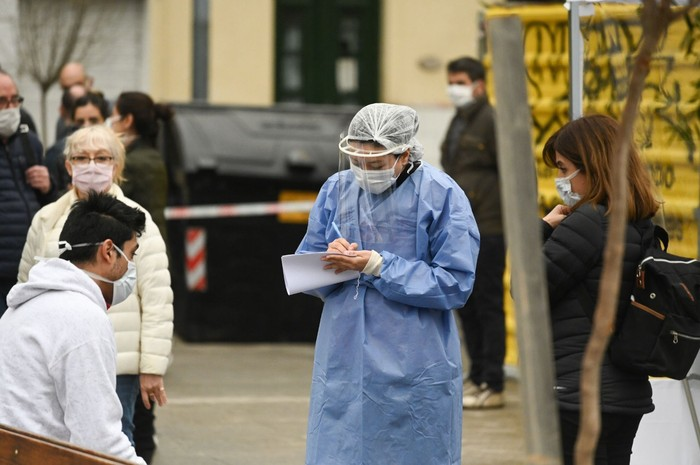
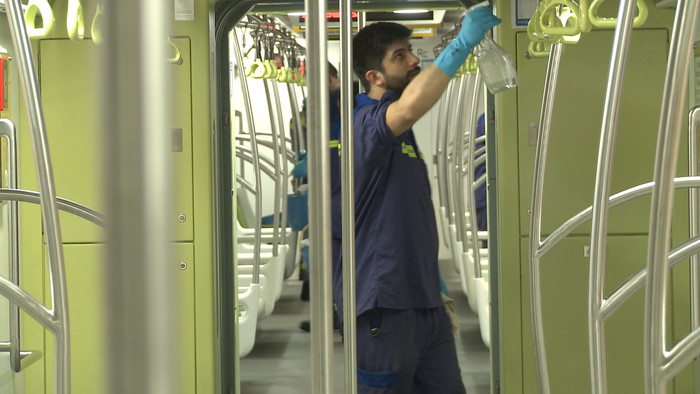
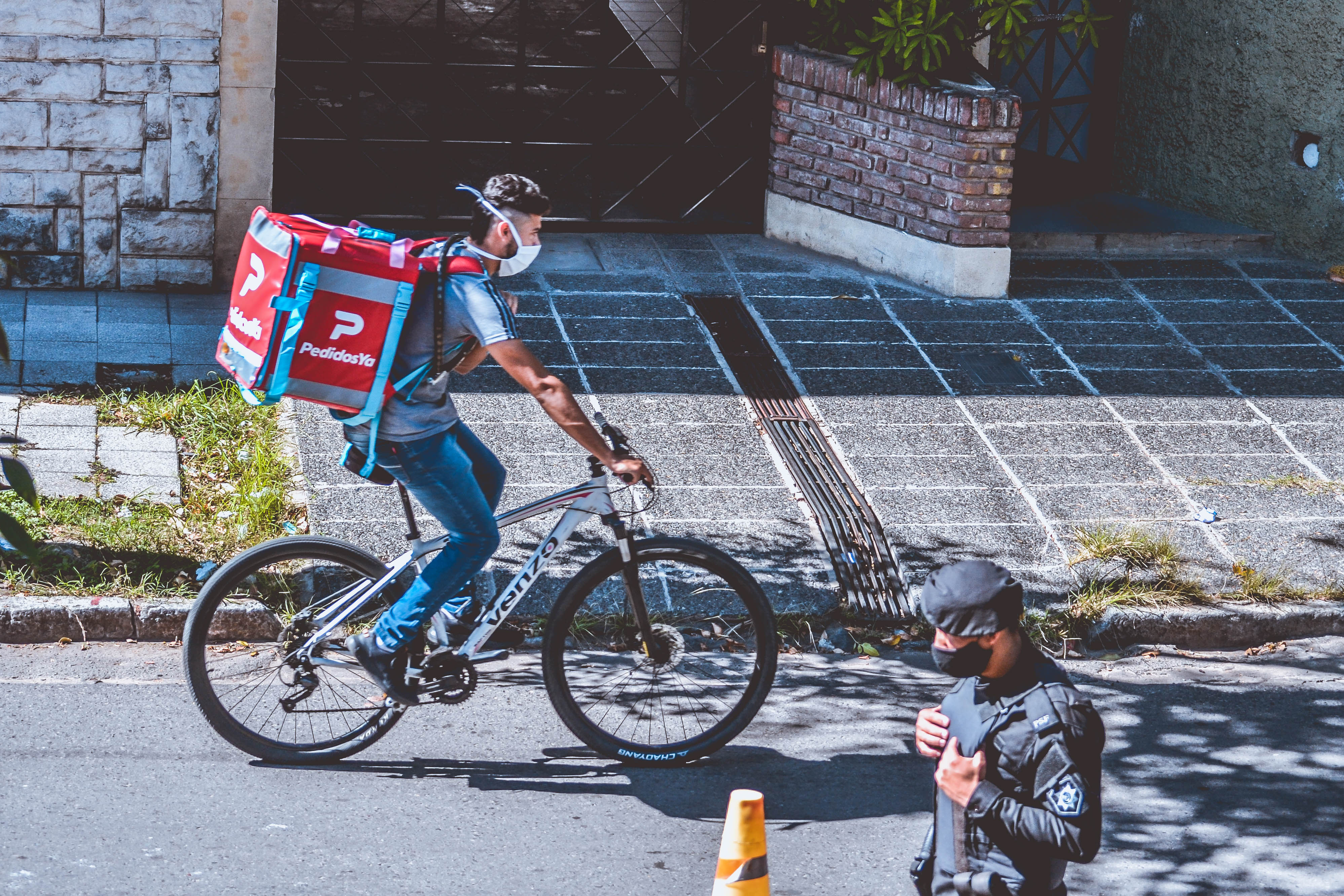
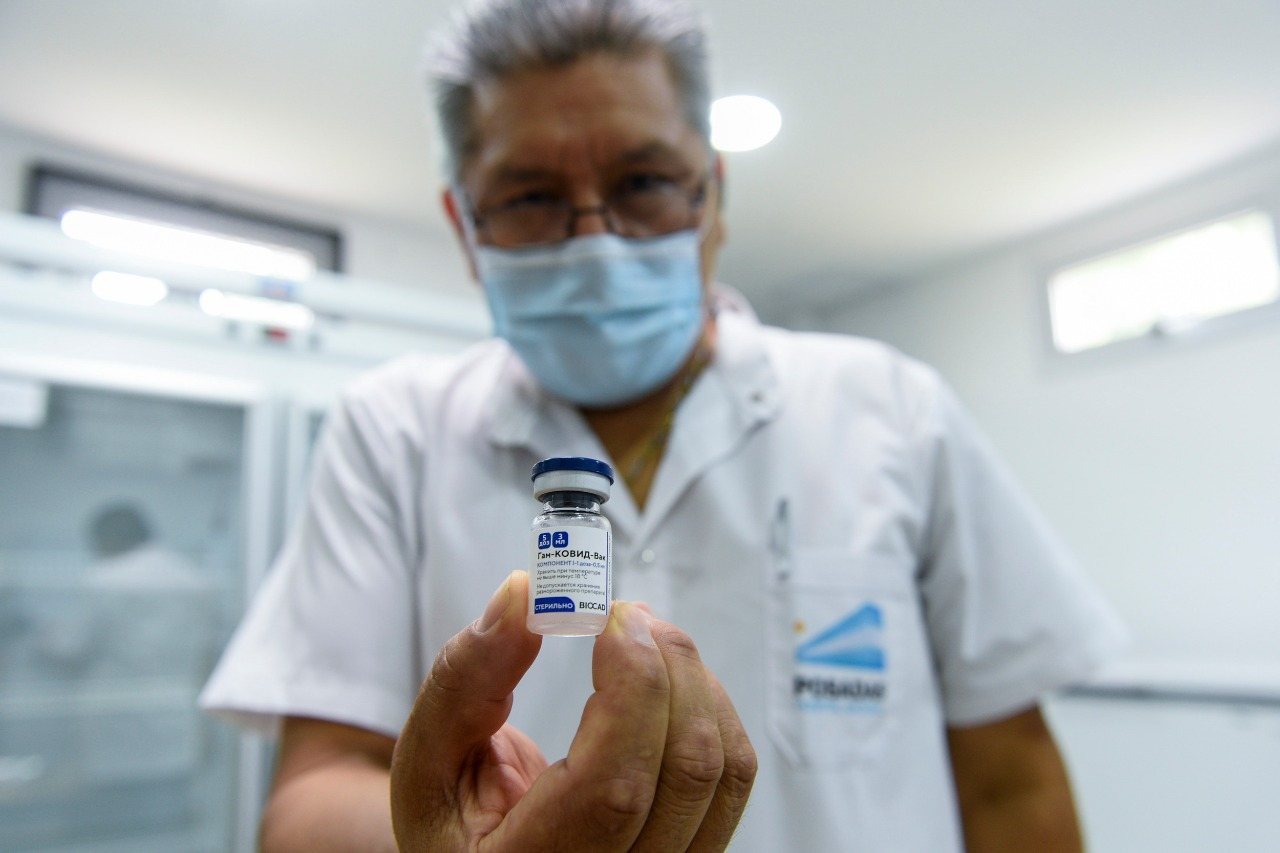
- (from the top, left to right): Contact tracing plan Detectar taking place in Buenos Aires to find patients with COVID-19; Cleaning the Buenos Aires Underground; A bicyclist and a police officer wearing masks in Santa Fe; A vial of the first component of the Sputnik V vaccine in the hands of an Argentine paramedic
- Disease: COVID-19
- Pathogen: SARS-CoV-2
- Location: Argentina
- First outbreak: Wuhan, Hubei, China
- Index case: Buenos Aires
- Arrival date: 3 March 2020 (6 years, 8 months, 2 weeks and 5 days)
- Confirmed cases: 10,120,270
- Recovered: 9,914,485
- Deaths: 130,865
- Fatality rate: 1.3%
- Vaccinations: 41,529,056 (total vaccinated); 34,900,612 (fully vaccinated); 116,978,520 (doses administered)

Government website
- Boletines epidemiológicos

The COVID-19 pandemic in Argentina is part of the worldwide pandemic of coronavirus disease 2019 (COVID-19) caused by severe acute respiratory syndrome coronavirus 2 (SARS-CoV-2). As of 5 November 2026, a total of 10,120,270 people were confirmed to have been infected, and 130,865 people were known to have died because of the virus.

On 3 March 2020, the virus was confirmed to have spread to Argentina. On 7 March 2020, the Ministry of Health confirmed the country's first documented death, a 64-year-old man who had travelled to Paris, France, who also had other health conditions; the case was only confirmed as positive after the patient's demise.

On 19 March 2020, a nationwide lockdown was established in Argentina. The lockdown was lifted throughout all the country, excepting the Greater Buenos Aires urban area (where 31.9% of the country's population live), on 10 May, with Greater Buenos Aires locked down until 17 July, where the lockdown was due to be gradually loosened in several stages to lead to the return to normality; restrictions were extended several times until 8 November 2020. During the second wave, another nationwide lockdown took place from 22 to 31 May 2021.

Responses to the outbreak have included restrictions on commerce and movement, closure of borders, and the closure of schools and educational institutions. Clusters of infections and deaths have occurred in nursing homes, prisons and other detention centers, and urban areas. The number of tests increased over time, although there were some concerns as there was less testing than in other countries of the region such as Chile and Peru. Even so, the government's responses to the pandemic were among the best received by the population in the region during the early stages of the pandemic.

== Background ==
On 12 January, the World Health Organization (WHO) confirmed that a novel coronavirus was the cause of a respiratory illness in a cluster of people in Wuhan, Hubei, China, who was reported to the WHO on 31 December 2019. The case fatality rate for COVID-19 has been much lower than the 2002–2004 SARS outbreak, but transmission has been significantly greater, with a significant total death toll. Model-based simulations for Argentina indicate that the 95% confidence interval for the time-varying reproduction number R_{t} exceeded 1.0 from April to July 2020, after which it diminished to below 1.0 in October and November 2020.

== Timeline ==
Cases

Deaths

=== February 2020 ===
After the cruise ship Diamond Princess was quarantined in the Port of Yokohama in Japan after 10 passengers were diagnosed with COVID-19 during the early stages of the COVID-19 pandemic, among the passengers diagnosed positive was the first Argentine infected, a 61-year-old man traveling with his wife, who had no symptoms. The patient was later transferred to a hospital in Japan. The other seven Argentines on board, including his wife, remained on the ship in quarantine until 21 February. The man was finally released on 17 February. He left Japan on 24 February and arrived in Argentina on 26 February.

=== March 2020 ===
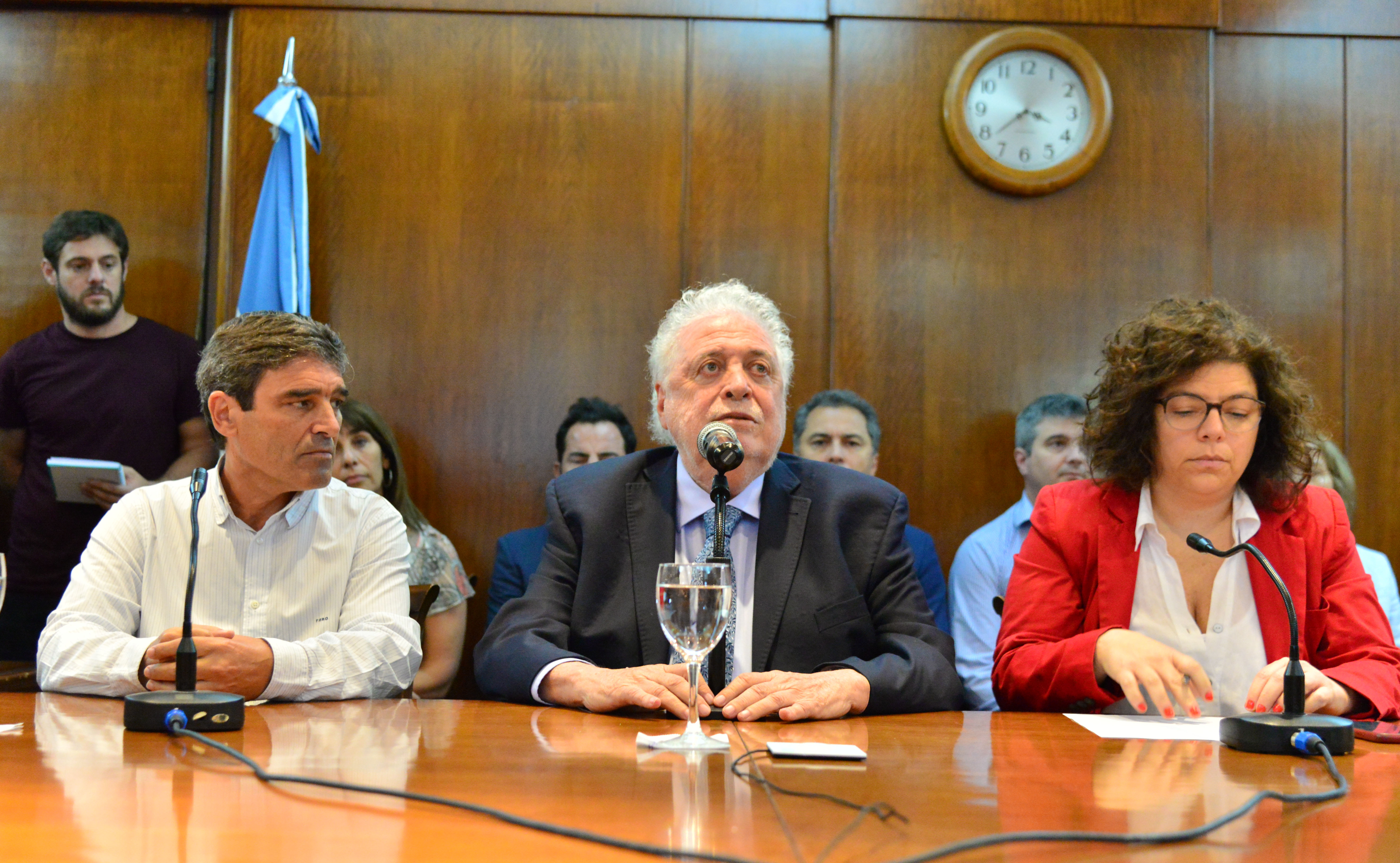
Minister of Health Ginés González García (center) announcing the first case of COVID-19 in the country, 3 March 2020

A first case of COVID-19 was confirmed in Buenos Aires on 3 March, in a 43-year-old man who had arrived two days earlier from Milan, Italy. Two days later, the second case was confirmed in a 23-year-old man living in Buenos Aires, who had recently returned from Northern Italy. Rapidly, on the next day the total cases increased to eight.

The Ministry of Health confirmed the country's first death from coronavirus in the country on 7 March, a 64-year-old man who had traveled to Paris who also had other health conditions. The person was not among the eight already diagnosed with the disease and was diagnosed post-mortem.

On 11 March, the government also announced a mandatory 14-day-quarantine to every person that returned to Argentina from highly affected countries including China, South Korea, Japan, Iran, the United States and all of Europe. The first cases from local transmission were confirmed on the next day in Buenos Aires and the provinces of Buenos Aires, Chaco, and Córdoba. In Chaco, the first native transmission was also confirmed. The first patient with the virus in the country was discharged and left hospital in Buenos Aires the next day.

Tierra del Fuego was put on lockdown on 16 March, becoming the first province to do so. The provinces of Chaco, Misiones, Salta, Jujuy, Mendoza and Tierra del Fuego closed their borders on 18 March. On the next day, in the night of 19 March, President Alberto Fernández announced a mandatory lockdown, in effect from midnight on 20 March until 31 March, but on 29 March Fernández announced that the mandatory lockdown would be extended until 12 April.

On 23 March, Ministry of Health officials reported the virus was spreading via "community transmission" in the City of Buenos Aires, its surroundings and some cities in Chaco, Tierra del Fuego and Córdoba provinces. March concluded with 1,054 confirmed cases and 27 fatal victims.

=== April 2020 ===
On 8 April, President Fernández announced that the mandatory lockdown would be extended beyond 12 April, with "flexibilization" of few activities only. In the night of 10 April, Fernández confirmed that the lockdown would be extended until 26 April in major cities, and that the flexibilization of restrictions in zones with lesser risk would be analysed. A third phase of the lockdown was later announced by the president on 25 March, extending it to major cities until 10 May.

After appearance of three asymptomatic cases, Buenos Aires authorities introduced compulsory masking starting on 14 April. Wearing a face mask was made obligatory for everyone on public transit and everyone who contacts the public in their position. Violators would face a fine. Authorities also prohibited the sale of N95 respirators to non-medical workers, suggesting the general public to use home-made masks instead.

April finally concluded with 4,415 confirmed cases, 218 deaths and 1,245 recoveries.

=== May–July 2020 ===
Number of cases (blue) and number of deaths (red) on a logarithmic scale.

On 8 May, Fernández announced that the national lockdown would be "relaxed" throughout the country with the exception of Greater Buenos Aires, where the lockdown was extended first until 24 May, and later until 7 June (on 23 May), due to a significant increase in the number of new cases in the previous days of the announcement. May ended with 16,838 confirmed cases, 539 deaths and 5,323 recoveries.

On 9 June, the government of the Formosa Province reported the first case of COVID-19 in its province, leaving the Catamarca Province as the only province that did not report any cases at the time.

Martín Insaurralde, the mayor of Lomas de Zamora was diagnosed with COVID-19 and isolated on 12 June. After having meetings with the mayor, the Ministry of Social Development was also tested. This led to the suspension of the previously planned president's visit to Catamarca, the only province that had not reported any cases to this date.

The first official data from ICU bed occupation became available on 24 June, with an occupation of 45 per cent throughout the country. A few days later, it was informed that June concluded with 64,517 confirmed cases, 1,307 deaths and 22,015 recoveries from the virus.

On 3 July, The Governor of the Catamarca Province confirmed its first case within the province. Catamarca was the last province to report its first case since the virus reached the country on 3 March.

At a press conference given by President Fernández, Governors Axel Kicillof (Province of Buenos Aires), Jorge Capitanich (Chaco), Gerardo Morales (Jujuy) and Arabela Carreras (Río Negro), and the Mayor of the City of Buenos Aires, Horacio Rodríguez Larreta on 17 July, it was announced that the lockdown would be loosened in the coming weeks, in an attempt to return to normality. Two weeks later, on 31 July, in another press conference, Fernández announced that the lockdown restrictions at that moment would continue until 16 August as there were a record of cases and deaths in the past days due to the virus. July concluded with 191,289 confirmed cases, 3,543 deaths and 83,767 recoveries.

=== August–September 2020 ===
On 9 August, the Ministry of Health confirmed a total of 61,867 new recoveries on that day. This big jump was due to a revision on the definition of a recovery, which now included (among the discharged from the hospitals) mild cases in which the system would automatically discharge 10 days after the symptom onset date. This led to a recovery rate of 70% of confirmed COVID-19 cases through the date. President Fernández announced on 28 August that meetings of up to ten people in the open air, maintaining two meters of distance and using a face mask were authorised throughout the country. That same day, it was announced that the eased lockdown would be extended again until 20 September. August finally concluded with 417,722 confirmed cases, 8,660 deaths and 301,182 recoveries.

During this month, schools and sports began the return to their activities. Over 10,000 students in San Juan became the first to return to face-to-face classes through social distancing on 10 August. The Argentine Football Association (AFA) announced that after health protocols being approved by the government, practices of the Men's First Division and Women's First Division would definitely return on 10 August.

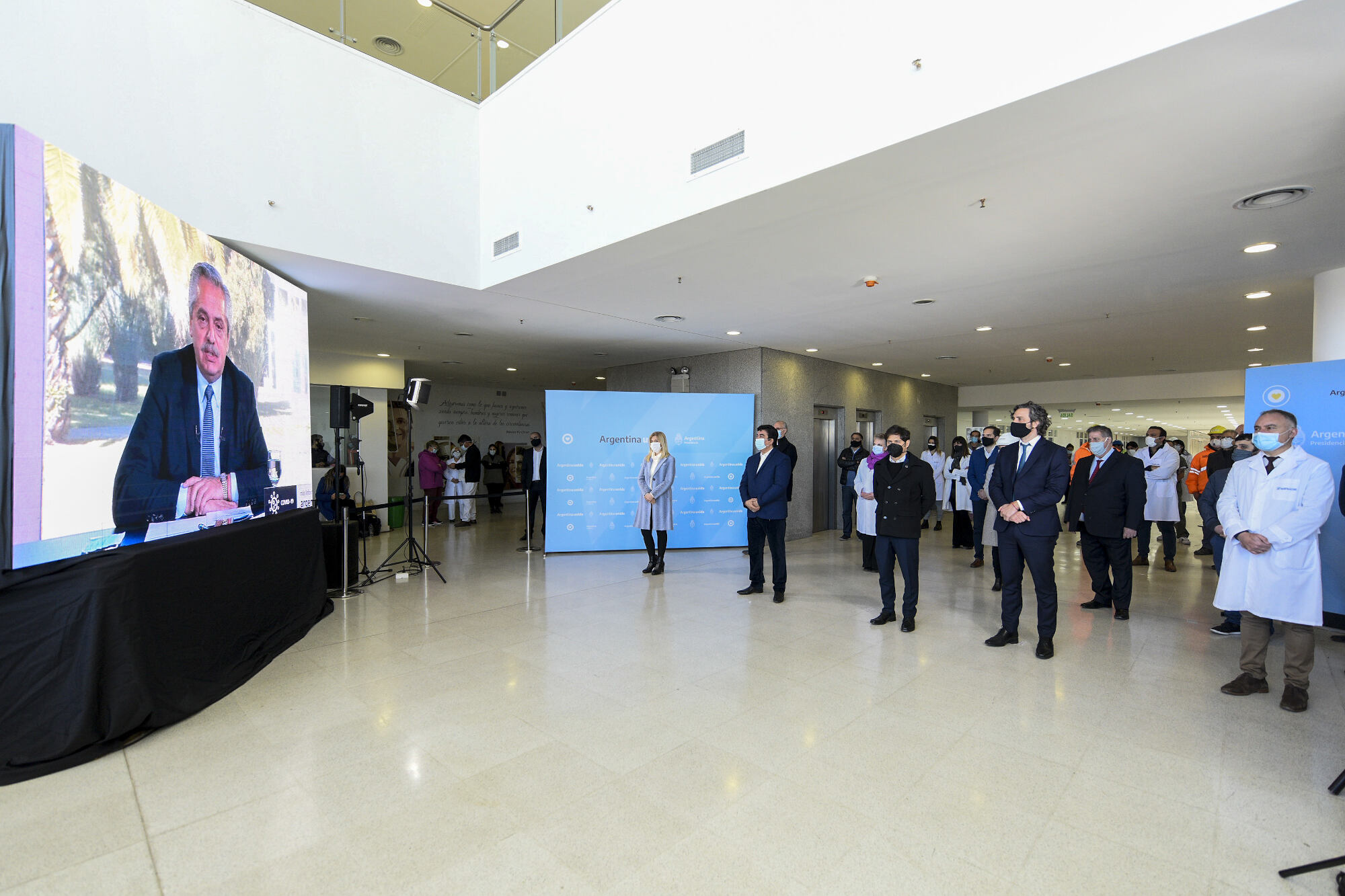
President Fernández and other members of the government inaugurate a hospital in La Matanza for COVID-19 patients.

On 14 August, it was confirmed that the governor of Jujuy (Gerardo Morales) and the Security Minister from the Province of Buenos Aires (Sergio Berni) tested positive for COVID-19. They both described that were "asymptomatic" and also "complying with isolation and all medical recommendations".

The lockdown was extended for three more weeks on 18 September, expecting it to last until 11 October. The contagion rate on the Greater Buenos Aires area dropped from 93 to 50.8 per cent from May though September, indicating that the virus increased its spreading through all the country. In the first 15 days of September, the provinces of Córdoba, Jujuy, La Rioja, Mendoza, Neuquén, Río Negro, Salta, Santa Cruz, Santa Fe, Tierra del Fuego and Tucumán registered exponential increases in their number of cases, with most of them showing high strain on their healthcare systems. On 25 September, the Health Access Secretary informed that during the previous week there was a "stabilization trend" in the Greater Buenos Aires area with a "high peak of positive cases". On the same day, it was confirmed that the Minister of Social Development, Daniel Arroyo, tested positive, while the Minister of Health of Santa Fe was hospitalised in a hospital in Rosario due to a worsening of her symptoms after testing positive for COVID-19. September concluded with 750,988 cumulative confirmed cases, 16,937 cumulative deaths and 594,632 recoveries.

=== October–December 2020 ===
On 2 October, the governor of the province of Buenos Aires, Axel Kicillof, isolated with his family after having contact with a government worker who tested positive for COVID-19. One week later, Fernández announced that due to the epidemiological situation in the previous weeks, the lockdown would continue for another two weeks until 25 October. Contagion rate from greater Buenos Aires diminished versus the rest of the country. As of this date, 65 per cent of the total daily confirmed cases came from all the country except the Greater Buenos Aires area, which was the main contagion focus in the past months. The provinces of Río Negro, Mendoza, Tucumán, Santa Fe, Salta, Santiago del Estero, Neuquén and Córdoba saw an increase in the number of occupied ICU beds, with Río Negro reaching to an 88 per cent of occupation.

On 20 October, Argentina confirmed over 1,000,000 positive cases, becoming the fifth country to do so and the second country in South America to pass the landmark. Three days later, it was announced that the lockdown would continue for another two weeks in provinces with a high number of daily new confirmed cases. October finally ended with a total of 1,166,911 cases, 31,002 deaths and 973,926 recoveries from the virus.

During the first days of November, the government announced that will acquire during December 2020 and January 2021, 25 million of doses from the Russian vaccine Sputnik V after it would enter phase III. Other vaccines such as the developed by University of Oxford and AstraZeneca, Pfizer, and China were also announced to be acquired eventually.

The president also said on 3 November, that "the horizon was starting to come into sight", after the 7-day average of new cases dipped significantly after hitting a high on 21 October. This led to an end on the lockdown established in the Greater Buenos Aires area after more than seven months, set to conclude on 8 November and moving into the social distancing phase. November concluded with 1,424,518 confirmed cases, 38,730 deaths and 1,257,214 recoveries.

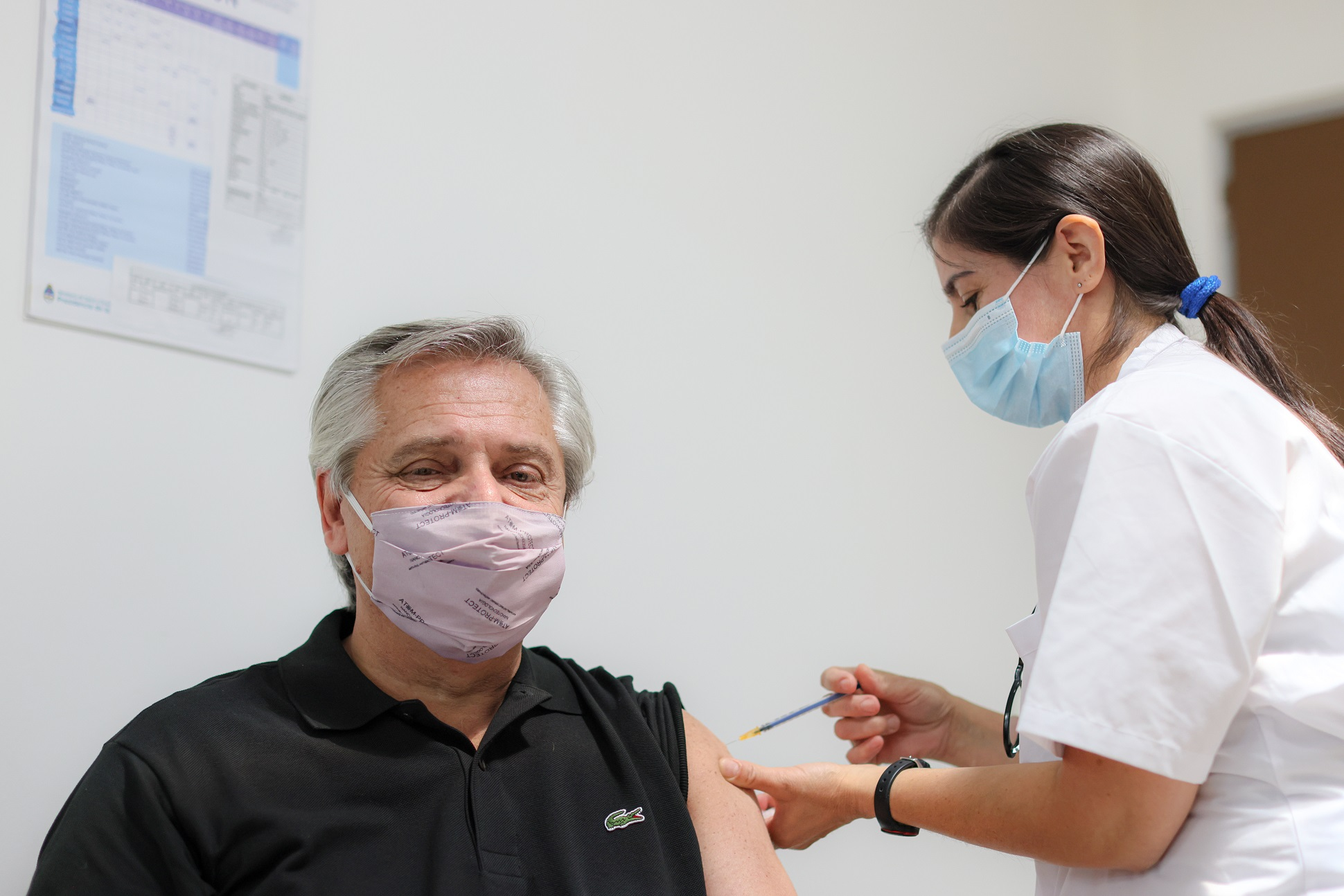
Alberto Fernandez became the first Latin American president to be inoculated, via the Sputnik V vaccine.

On 22 December the flight that would bring the first doses of the Sputnik V vaccine to the country left for Moscow, after negotiations began in early December. 300,000 doses arrived on 24 December, with the vaccination campaign beginning on 29 December. The governor of the province of Buenos Aires, Axel Kicillof, was among the first to receive the vaccine. One day later, the AZD1222 vaccine developed by University of Oxford and AstraZeneca was also approved in the country. The last report of December informed that there were 1,613,911 confirmed cases, 43,163 deaths and 1,426,659 recoveries from the virus at the end of 2020.

=== January–March 2021 ===
Towards the end of the Christmas and holiday season, there was a rise on the number of daily confirmed cases. This concerned President Fernández, whom appealed to call for "individual responsibility". On 6 January, the Chief of Government of the City of Buenos Aires, Horacio Rodríguez Larreta, tested positive for COVID-19.

On 8 January, the government announced an immediate national night-time curfew after a big rise in the number of infections in the previous weeks. It ran daily from 1–6 a.m., and was intended to reduce the viral circulation.

The first case from the lineage B.1.1.7 of the virus was confirmed on 16 January, one month after being reported in the United Kingdom in mid-December. This variant is known for showing evidence of increased transmissibility.

On 21 January, President Fernández became the first Latin American leader to be inoculated against the disease via the recently approved Sputnik V. He was later followed by Vice-President Cristina Fernández de Kirchner, who received the vaccine on 24 January.

On 19 February, the president asked the Minister of Health Ginés González García to resign, after media reported that people were able to use connections to get access to the COVID-19 vaccines. This came to light after journalist Horacio Verbitsky said he received a shot after being offered by the minister. On the next day, former Health Access Secretary Carla Vizzotti was sworn as the new Minister of Health, pledging fair vaccine access after the scandal.

On 29 March, the government confirmed community contact cases from various SARS-CoV-2 variants. Cases from the lineage B.1.1.7 (from the United Kingdom) showed an increase in the frequency of detection of the variant in Greater Buenos Aires during the previous epidemiological weeks. Other cases from the P.1 (from Brazil/Japan), P.2 (Brazil) and CAL.20C variants (United States), and L452R mutations were also found among the population.

=== April–August 2021 ===
President Fernández tested positive for COVID-19 on 3 April, showing mild symptoms. Fernández had been previously received the full vaccination against the virus earlier on the same year. During the first week of April, there was also an increase in the number of daily confirmed cases, leading to the begin of the second wave of the pandemic in the country. On 8 April, during a visit by United States Southern Command chief Craig S. Faller to the country, the United States announced the donation of three mobile hospitals, oxygen generators, among other supplies for other areas. The United States also donated equipment for training on response to situations of disasters or a pandemic.

New restrictions were applied since 16 April in Greater Buenos Aires after a rise in the number of new confirmed cases and ICU bed occupation, including a curfew from 8 p.m. to 6 a.m. and the closing of schools for two weeks. Even with those restrictions, cases continued to rise, leading to the government's decision to implement another nationwide lockdown from 22 to 31 May 2021.

After a delay in the delivery of second doses of the Sputnik V vaccine, the government announced on 5 August that they would begin applying Moderna and AstraZeneca vaccines as replacements of the second doses of the Russian vaccine. Later, it was reported that Argentina's Richmond laboratories delivered nearly a million doses of the first component of the Sputnik V vaccine produced in the country to the Ministry of Health.

During August, Buenos Aires City's Health Minister Fernán Quirós announced that the COVID-19 Delta variant was very close to entering into community transmission. It was later confirmed on 24 August that the first case of contagion via community circulation of the Delta variant was found in Lanús, in Buenos Aires Province.

=== September 2021–January 2022 ===
On 6 December, the health ministry announced the detection of the first positive case of SARS-CoV-2 Omicron variant in a fully vaccinated Argentine traveler, who entered country by airplane on 30 November from South Africa via the United States.

On 7 January, Argentina surpassed over 110,000 positive tests in a single day, marking a record number of cases for a fourth consecutive day due to the surge of Omicron cases.

On 11 January, Carla Vizzotti confirmed changes for isolation protocols and explained that "the testing strategy is focused on people with symptoms". She said "the virus is behaving in an endemic way" and stated that "most infections are very mild and moderate". She discouraged attending social gatherings and mass events, and went on to mention the value of immunity from vaccination and natural infection.

== Responses ==
=== Medical response ===
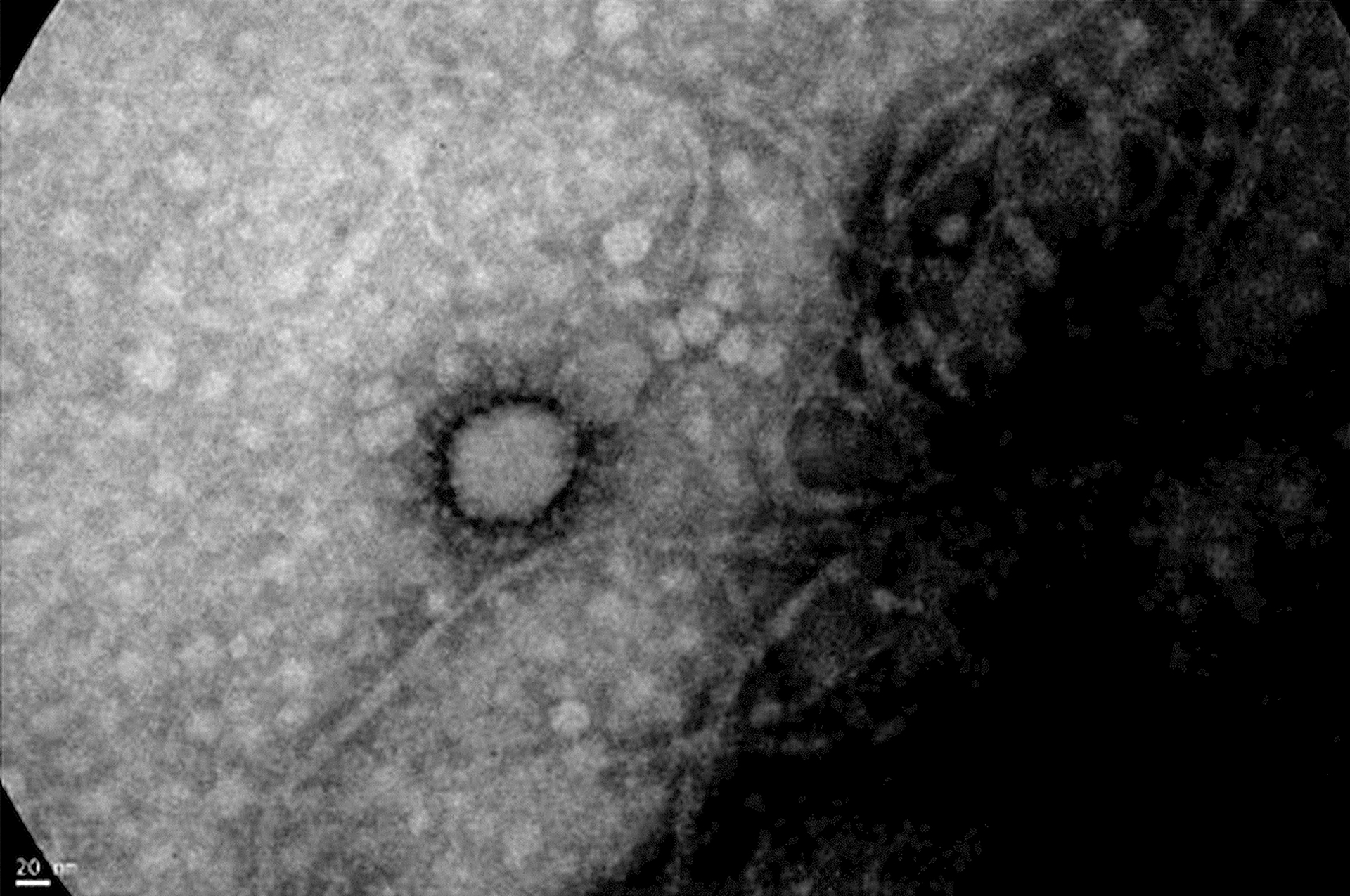
Image of SARS-CoV-2 taken by the Cell Biology and Neuroscience Institute "Professor E. de Robertis", UBA-CONICET.

==== Initial response ====
The Ministry of Health summoned health professionals to provide health services in the context of the pandemic, in search of reinforcing the teams made up by the national and provincial governments. This call included nurses, biochemists, physiotherapists and physicians, in particular in the fields of medical clinic, cardiology, pneumonology, adult and paediatric intensive care, emergentology, paediatrics and general and/or family medicine. Proposals from professionals from other specialties were also received. Around 4,000 people joined a call from the University of Buenos Aires (UBA) to summon volunteers to help on the influenza vaccination campaign, advanced medical students to be in triage in tents near hospitals where the patients will be first checked, volunteers to do a follow-up of isolated patients at home with a confirmed or suspected diagnosis of COVID-19, and volunteers to work on logistics.

==== Testing ====
The ANLIS-Malbrán (National Administration of Laboratories and Health Institutes "Dr. Carlos G. Malbrán") began carrying out 300 daily COVID-19 tests. Later, after 820 confirmed cases were reached, the Ministry of Health started the delivery of 35,000 reactives to expand the number of laboratories for diagnosis to all 24 jurisdictions to decentralise the testings, making the number of testings increase over time. Private medical clinics would be able to do up to 7,500 daily tests to decompress the public health system. Previously, the delivery of the diagnostic result was taking four to five days on average for patients in private clinics.

==== Contact tracing ====
As an effort to fight and contain the virus, the Ministry of Health implemented a plan of contact tracing in defined areas where an increase in the number of cases is detected or estimated. The plan launched first in Buenos Aires and was later extended throughout the country. The program, called Detectar (Detect in English; Strategic Testing Device for Coronavirus in Argentina Terrain), launched on May after a big jump in the number of cases in low socioeconomic class and densely populated neighbourhoods in Greater Buenos Aires, known as villas.

==== Drug therapy and vaccine development ====
On 17 April 2020, a clinical trial based on plasma donation of recovered patients from COVID-19 was created to find out if the antibodies of a recovered patient could benefit those who are being infected. It began on hospitals and hemotherapy centers in Greater Buenos Aires and was later extended to the rest of the country.

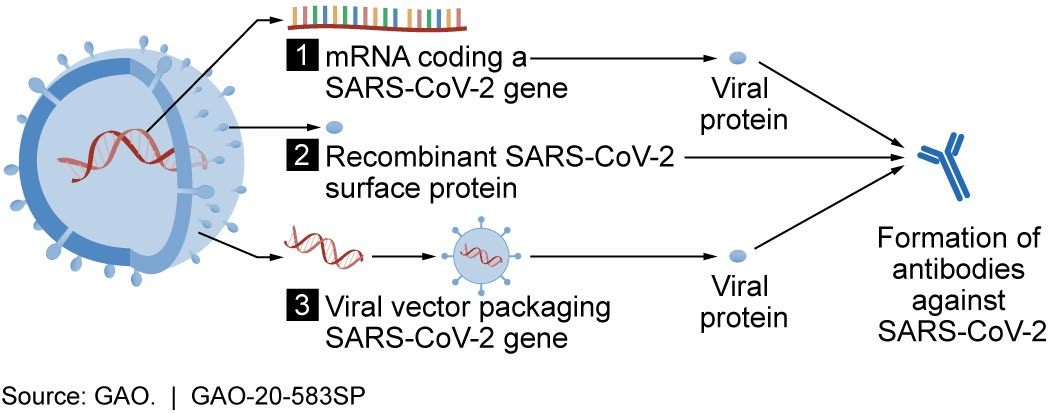
Potential candidates for forming SARS-CoV-2 proteins to prompt an immune response.

Argentine scientists developed a quick diagnosis test to detect the severe acute respiratory syndrome coronavirus 2 (SARS-CoV-2), approved by the National Administration of Medicines, Food and Medical Technology (ANMAT in Spanish). The test, called NEOKIT-COVID-19, allows to obtain results in almost an hour and it offers a high degree of sensitivity (which reduces the possibility of false negatives) and specificity (which minimises the probability of false positives). This test allows testing RNA samples and does not require complex equipment (such as thermal cyclers). It was expected that 10,000 tests would be produced within the first 10 days. On 13 June 2020, a new announcement of another quick diagnosis test to detect the SARS-CoV-2 was made. Called ELA-chemstrip, it was developed by Argentine scientists from the National University of Quilmes and the National University of General San Martín. Another SARS-CoV-2 diagnostic kit with RT-qPCR technology was approved in September 2020 by ANMAT, while a new kit under development (as of that date), would allow the joint detection of SARS-CoV-2 and the viruses that cause influenza.

On 31 May 2020, it was announced that Argentine scientists were also working to develop a COVID-19 vaccine, a project subsidised by the Ministry of Science, Technology and Productive Innovation. On 10 July 2020, pharmaceutical corporations Pfizer and BioNTech announced that the clinical trial for the COVID-19 vaccine BNT162 that was on phase I–II as of the day of the announcement, would begin on early-August in Argentina, soon after the trial began on Germany and the United States. After it would be approved by the ANMAT, the trial would take place at the Central Militar Hospital. The trial is made by mRNA constructs and consists of four vaccines, randomised, placebo-controlled, dose-finding and vaccine candidate-selection, and would begin its phase IIb-III after preliminary data from the previous phase were positive. One month later, Fernández announced that the vaccine produced by the University of Oxford and AstraZeneca (AZD1222) would begin production alongside Mexico after an agreement with the British pharmaceutical company and the biotechnology company mAbxience. Initially 150 million doses of the vaccine would be produced to supply all of Latin America (with the exception of Brazil). As of the day of the announcement, the vaccine, consisting of modified chimp adenovirus vector, was entering phase III.

A COVID-19 hyperimmune serum based on equine polyclonal antibodies was developed by Argentine biotech company Inmunova. The antibodies were obtained by injecting a recombinant protein of SARS-CoV-2 in these animals, with in vitro testings demonstrating the ability to neutralise the virus. On 24 July 2020, the trial entered its phase II–III after being approved by ANMAT.

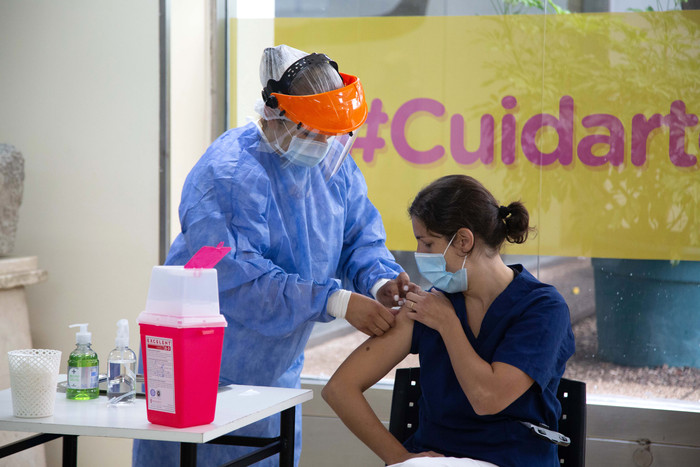
Health worker being vaccinated with Sputnik V against COVID-19 in Buenos Aires.

On 3 November 2020, President Fernández announced in an interview with Russian news agency that government would receive an initial of more than 10 million doses of the Sputnik V vaccine by as early as December 2020, after it would enter phase III. Other previously announced vaccines in development would also be acquired to a lesser extent by the government, such as those produced by the University of Oxford and AstraZeneca, Pfizer and China. Government officials also said that the deployment of any coronavirus vaccine in Argentina would not be mandatory. 300,000 doses of the Sputnik V vaccine arrived at the country in late December 2020. The Sputnik V and the BNT162b2 vaccines were the first to receive emergency approvals from ANMAT, On 30 December 2020, the University of Oxford and AstraZeneca's vaccine AZD1222 was also approved for use by ANMAT.

On 2 February 2021, it was announced that 1 million doses of the Sinopharm BIBP vaccine would arrive during February in Argentina.

=== Vaccination campaign ===
Vaccination against COVID-19 began in Argentina on 29 December 2020 aiming at health professionals. During the first week, 39,599 doses were applied to health professionals.

On 18 February 2021, vaccination on citizens aged over 70 began in the Province of Buenos Aires. Schools, among other sites, were used as temporary vaccination centres.

On 18 November 2021, health minister Vizzotti said that there was "sufficient stock" to vaccinate all the population with a booster dose. The campaign of the booster dose began in late October 2021, with people over the age of 70 and health personnel; and those above the age of 50 who completed their two doses with Sinopharm.

=== Public response ===
During the first weeks of the pandemic, people across the country used to applaud from balconies, terraces and windows of their houses and buildings at 9 pm, in order recognise the effort and work of health professionals, a demonstration similar to the ones that occurred during the pandemic in Spain and Italy.

Since late-May 2020, a few protestors began to rally in Buenos Aires to demand end of the lockdown, ignoring social distancing rules, and with the call to prioritise the re-opening of Argentina's economy and some conspiratorial overtones, due to the small and medium-size businesses and self-employed workers' economic struggle during this time. Despite the protests, a vast majority of Argentines were supportive of the lockdown, according to polls. Other protests were realised against the government policies to combat the pandemic, corruption and insecurity, and against the bill to reform some elements of the judiciary, but the conspiracy theories about the virus were still present in the protests.

== Government responses ==
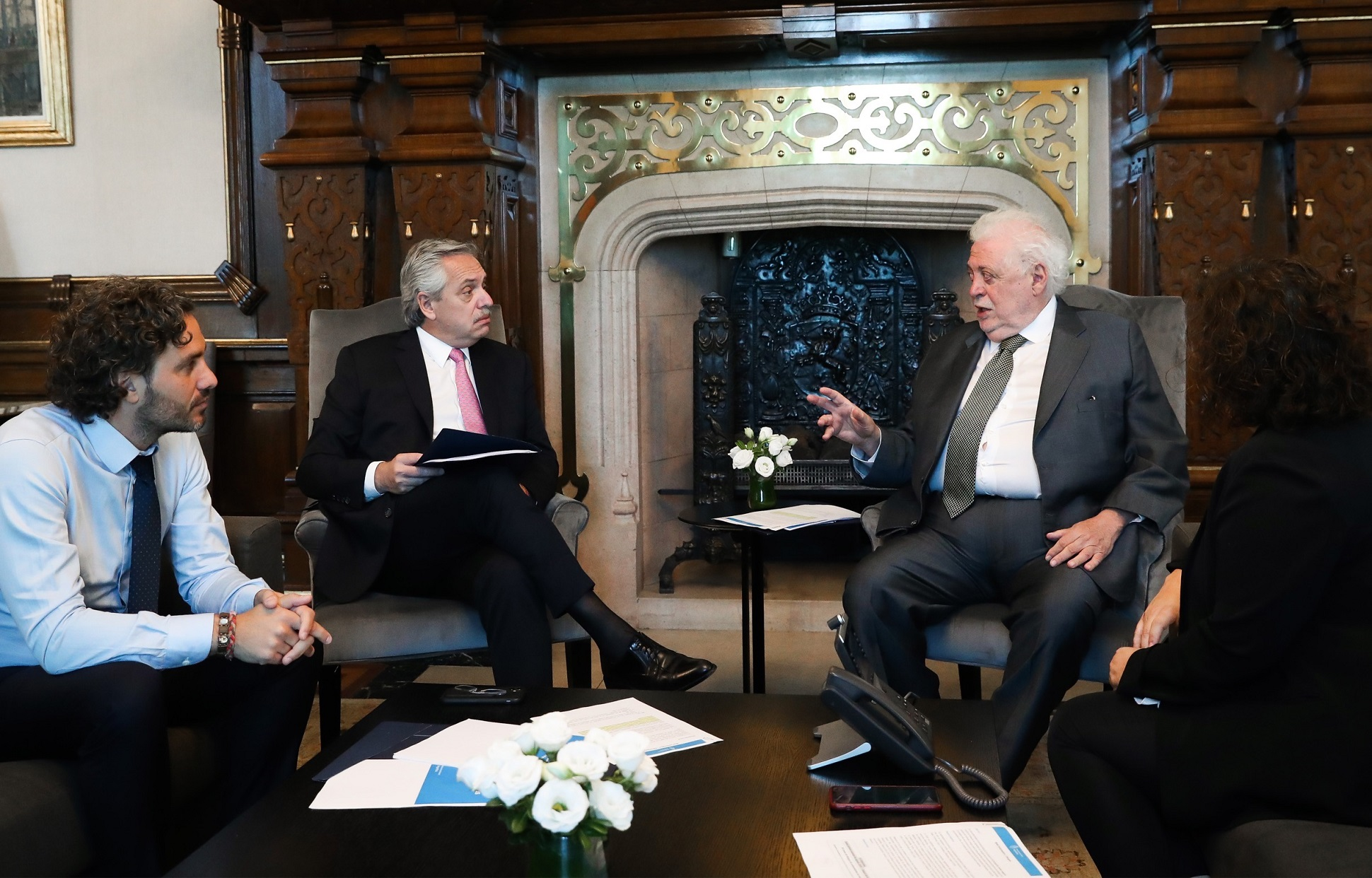
President Alberto Fernández meeting with officials about COVID-19 in late January 2020.

The government's responses to the pandemic was very well seen, including the mandatory lockdown and strict social distancing measures, resulting in a general better look in the number of cases and deaths than other countries in the region. The measures also brought some concerns with the economic impact that it could cause to the country. Even so, the way that president Fernández and its government handled the country's response to the spread of COVID-19 resulted in the best numbers of public approval since the president's assumption in December 2019. Argentina was among the Latin American countries that earned the best grades for their response to the pandemic, according to a poll conducted in the region, only behind Uruguay and Paraguay.

=== First measures ===
On 11 March 2020, the government announced a mandatory 14-day-quarantine to every person that returned to Argentina from highly affected countries such as China, South Korea, Japan, Iran, the United States and all of Europe.

On 15 March 2020, it was announced that the government would close its borders for a total of 15 days to non-residents and national parks, and the suspension of public and private school classes in all levels and flights from highly affected countries for 30 days.

On 16 March 2020, the province of Tierra del Fuego was put on lockdown, becoming the first province to do so. The provinces of Chaco, Misiones, Salta, Jujuy, Mendoza and Tierra del Fuego also decided to close their borders on 18 March 2020.

=== Nationwide measures ===
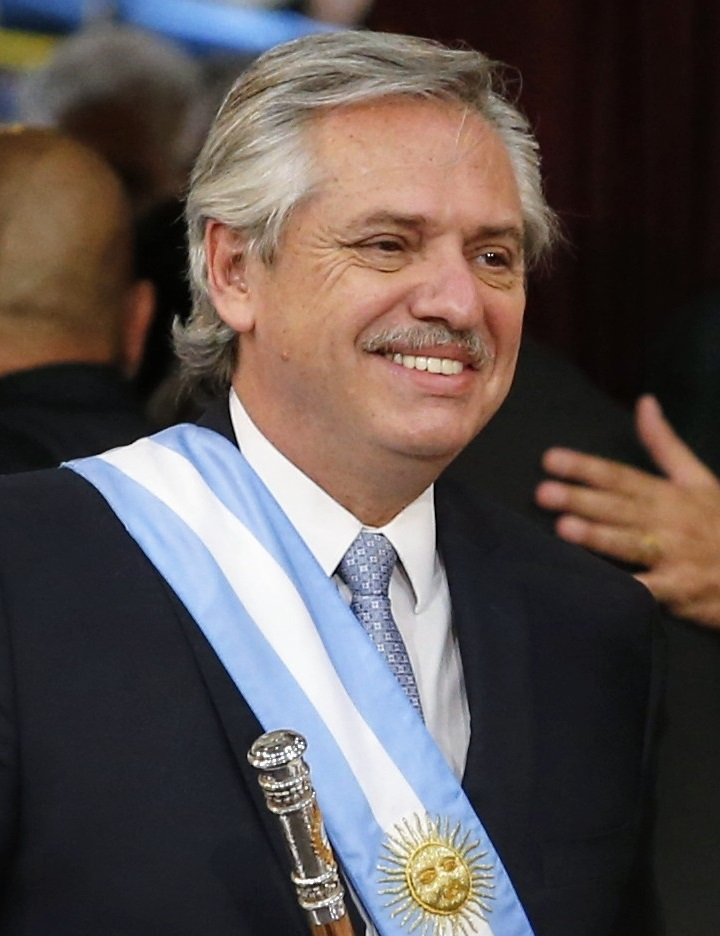
The announcement of the lockdown by President Alberto Fernández was generally well received, although there were concerns with its economic impact.

==== Mandatory lockdown ====
On 19 March 2020, President Alberto Fernández announced a mandatory lockdown to curb the spread of coronavirus. It would take effect from 20 March 2020 until 31 March 2020. It was among the strictest measures in the region.

The "preventive and mandatory social isolation" included the following measures:

- Mandatory lockdown for all residents,
- The move of Malvinas Day from 2 April to 31 March 2020,
- Allowance of purchases of foods, medicines and first need products,
- Transit control on the streets by Naval Prefecture, National Gendarmerie and Federal Police,
- Penalties to those that cannot justify their transit on the streets according to the Penal Code,
- Exception of the lockdown to state, health, food production, drugs production and oil industry workers and security forces,
- Creation of a government department that works on the pandemic and economic issues, and
- Guidelines to relieve the situation for non-formal sector.

On 29 March 2020, Fernández announced that the mandatory lockdown would be extended until 12 April 2020.

The announcement of the lockdown was generally well received, although there were concerns with its economic impact in the already delicate state of Argentina's economy, with analysts predicting at least 3% GDP decrease in 2020. Image of Fernández increased during the first weeks of the lockdown according to some surveys, but later suffered a slightly decrease in April 2020 due to the prolongation of the lockdown. The University of Buenos Aires also made a survey, in which most people agreed to the measures taken by the president.

Fernández announced a one-time emergency payment of 10,000 pesos (US$154) to lower-income individuals whose income was affected by the lockdown, including retirees. Because banks were excluded in the list of businesses that were considered essential in Fernandez's lockdown decree, they remained closed until the Central Bank announced banks would open during a weekend starting on 3 April 2020.

==== Administrated lockdown ====
On 10 April 2020, Fernández confirmed that the lockdown would be extended until 26 April 2020 under a "new phase" with new authorisations available for workers of some services such as banks, among others.

==== Geographical segmentation ====
The third phase of the lockdown was announced on 25 April 2020 by president Fernández. The lockdown would resume to workers of private construction, medical and dental care, industry production and online commerce, lawyers, and accountants, among others, in some provinces such as Entre Ríos, Jujuy, La Pampa, Mendoza, Misiones, Neuquén, Salta, San Juan, Santa Cruz and Tucumán, with the respective health protocols. Cities with population over 500,000 inhabitants are still under mandatory lockdown due to the community transmission of the virus.

==== Progressive reopening ====
On 8 May 2020, President Fernández announced alongside the City of Buenos Aires' Chief of Government Horacio Rodríguez Larreta and Buenos Aires Province Governor Axel Kicillof, that the national lockdown would enter its fourth phase throughout all the country (with the exception of the Greater Buenos Aires urban area), allowing the reopening of factories and business. The Greater Buenos Aires zone will maintain the geographical segmentation phase due to the number of cases that are still being registered in the area, but will allow children to go outside accompanied by an adult. The lockdown in the Greater Buenos Aires was later extended until 7 June 2020 after the number of cases in this area in the previous days showed a big increase. Later, on 4 June 2020, the lockdown was extended again until 28 June 2020 in the Greater Buenos Aires area after the country just surpassed 20,000 cases. New activities allowed in the area included opening of shops in "low concentration" areas, outdoor walks with children on the weekends, outdoor physical activities from 8 p.m. to 8 am, and religious services by streaming, among other measures taken by each municipality.

A survey realised during the first days of May 2020, expresses that the main concern of the surveyed people was the fear of virus contagion (50.9%) instead of the worries of a worsening in the economic situation (49.1%). Also, another survey expressed that 3 out of 10 Argentines believe the World Health Organization reports about the COVID-19 origins.

==== Lockdown tightening ====
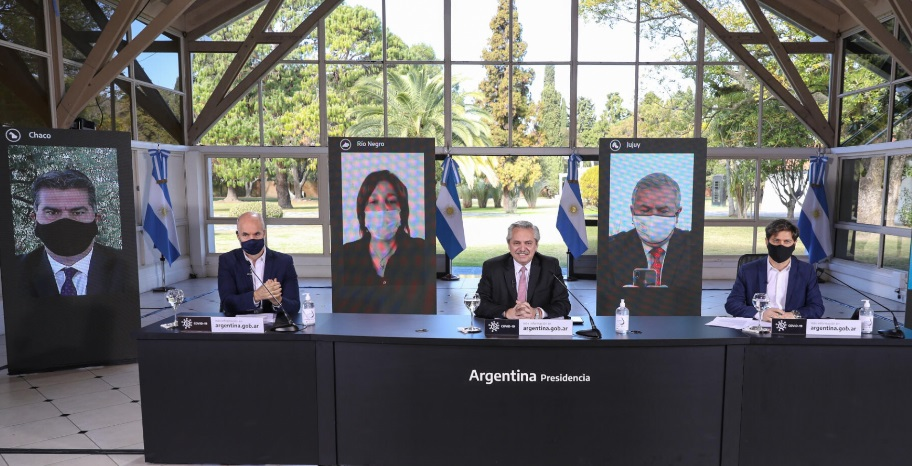
Press conference addressing the lockdown given by (from left to right) Governor Jorge Capitanich (Chaco), Mayor Horacio Rodríguez Larreta (City of Buenos Aires), Governor Arabela Carreras (Río Negro), President Fernández and Governors Gerardo Morales (Jujuy) and Axel Kicillof (Province of Buenos Aires).

President Fernández announced on 26 June 2020 that the restrictions on movement in Buenos Aires that were previously eased, would be tightened again since 1 July 2020 due to a spike in COVID-19 cases on Greater Buenos Aires. This phase of the lockdown would be extended until 17 July 2020. According to Fernández, this urban area saw an increase of 147% of COVID-19 cases, and an increase of 95% on deaths due to the disease during the previous 20 days of the announcement. Fernández also confirmed that 97% of detected cases across the country occur in the Greater Buenos Aires. New restrictions include: public transportation allowed only for essential workers, prohibition of outdoor activities and stronger transit control on the streets. Allowance of purchases of foods, medicines and first need products would be the only activity allowed without any permission.

==== Lockdown loosening ====
After the end of the previous phase of the lockdown in Greater Buenos Aires, President Fernández finally announced on 17 July 2020 that the lockdown would be gradually loosened in several stages to lead to the return to normality. New activities allowed include individual outdoor recreation activities, opening of local shops, car washers, clothing and footwear stores, hairdressing, waxing, manicure and pedicure shops in all neighbourhoods, return of administrative staff to schools, individual prayers in temples (with no more than 10 people on the site), return of dog walkers, opening of libraries (without staying in the place), and return of professional activities, such as lawyers and accountants, at least once a week. Public transportation would still be only allowed for workers in essential areas such as healthcare, security, gastronomy and others.

As the lockdown was due to expire on 2 August 2020, Fernández announced in a press conference on 31 July that the restrictions would continue until 16 August at least, after the country recorded a record daily tally of new cases and deaths on the previous day of the announcement. A few days later, the government decided to ban social gatherings across the country for 15 days amid surge of infections and fatalities. The lockdown was again extended after 147 days (on 14 August 2020), for two more weeks until 30 August. Several cities that experienced a big growth in the number of confirmed cases in the previous weeks were put back into a tighter lockdown. The cities of Tartagal, La Rioja, Chamical, Santiago del Estero and La Banda were expected to join the places that were already with a strict lockdown such as Greater Buenos Aires, Jujuy (Libertador Gral. San Martín, Manuel Belgrano, El Carmen and San Pedro), Santa Cruz (Río Gallegos) and Tierra del Fuego (Río Grande).

On 28 August 2020 it was announced that the eased lockdown would be extended again until 20 September 2020. Also, meetings of up to ten people in the open air, maintaining two meters of distance and using a face mask were authorised throughout the country. As the lockdown was due to expire on 20 September 2020, two days earlier President Fernández confirmed another extension of the lockdown for three weeks until 11 October 2020. Local authorities are still in charge of applying new restrictions in each territory.

After three weeks, Fernández announced that due to the epidemiological situation in the weeks prior to 9 October 2020, the lockdown would continue until 25 October with new measures to decrease circulation in 18 provinces. In Buenos Aires new activities such as the gradual return to face-to-face classes, habilitation of domestic service, cultural events, construction and other social and commercial authorisations were announced by Mayor Rodríguez Larreta on the same day.

As the country surpassed the million cases on 19 October 2020, President Fernández announced four days later that the lockdown would be extended again for two weeks in the provinces of Chubut, Córdoba, Mendoza, Neuquén, Río Negro, San Luis, Santa Fe and Tucumán, and in Greater Buenos Aires, as these provinces have been accounting for 55 per cent of the country's total cases in the previous weeks. In Greater Buenos Aires the gradual opening of activities would continue in cities with a decrease in the number of daily cases. Openings in internal areas in bars and restaurants, gyms, artisan fairs, public pools, museums and schools were confirmed to apply in Buenos Aires.

==== Social distancing ====
On 6 November 2020, Fernández announced that the lockdown would come to an end in Greater Buenos Aires to move to the social distancing phase, although it could continue in other provinces until 29 November 2020. This was due to a decrease in the number of cases after eight weeks. Gradual openings would begin to be implemented to all educational levels, restaurants and bars with indoor services and private construction, and outdoor social gatherings would be allowed.

A restriction to nighttime activities was applied on 11 January 2021 after a rise of the number of COVID-19 cases in the previous weeks. The curfew would run daily from 1 to 6 a.m., being intended to reduce the circulation of the virus. The shutting down of clandestine parties attended by young people are also encouraged, which experts believe is a key factor behind the recent surge in cases. Not every province applied the curfew, like Córdoba and Jujuy. The City of Buenos Aires closed all commercial business between 1 and 6 a.m. beginning 10 January 2021, but without restrictions on circulation unlike the rest of the provinces.

On 30 January 2021, social distancing was extended until 1 March 2021, with the decree altered to allow for return of face-to-face classes at schools nationwide since February.

==== Second wave restrictions ====
The government announced on 14 April 2021 that from the following day new restrictions would apply to Greater Buenos Aires for two weeks after a rise in the number of daily cases and ICU bed occupation. Measures included the close of schools, curfew between 8 p.m. and 6 a.m. and the suspension of indoor sports, recreational, religious and cultural activities.

A month later, a nine-day nationwide lockdown was announced after the number of daily cases continued to rise. It took place from 22 to 31 May 2021, with only essential businesses opened, classes suspended and restaurants only open for home delivery and pick-up services. Also, citizens were only allowed to circulate between 6 a.m. and 6 p.m., with social, economic, religious and sporting activities banned.

==== Second loosening of restrictions ====
In October 2021, after the number of infections considerably decreased and having reached the mark of more than 70% of the population vaccinated, some regions, especially Buenos Aires lifted the face mask mandate when outdoors. The order was signed by the Mayor of Buenos Aires Horacio Rodríguez Larreta. Many other provinces and cities followed suit, with only being the face mask mandate being obligatory when indoors.

== Impact ==
=== Healthcare ===
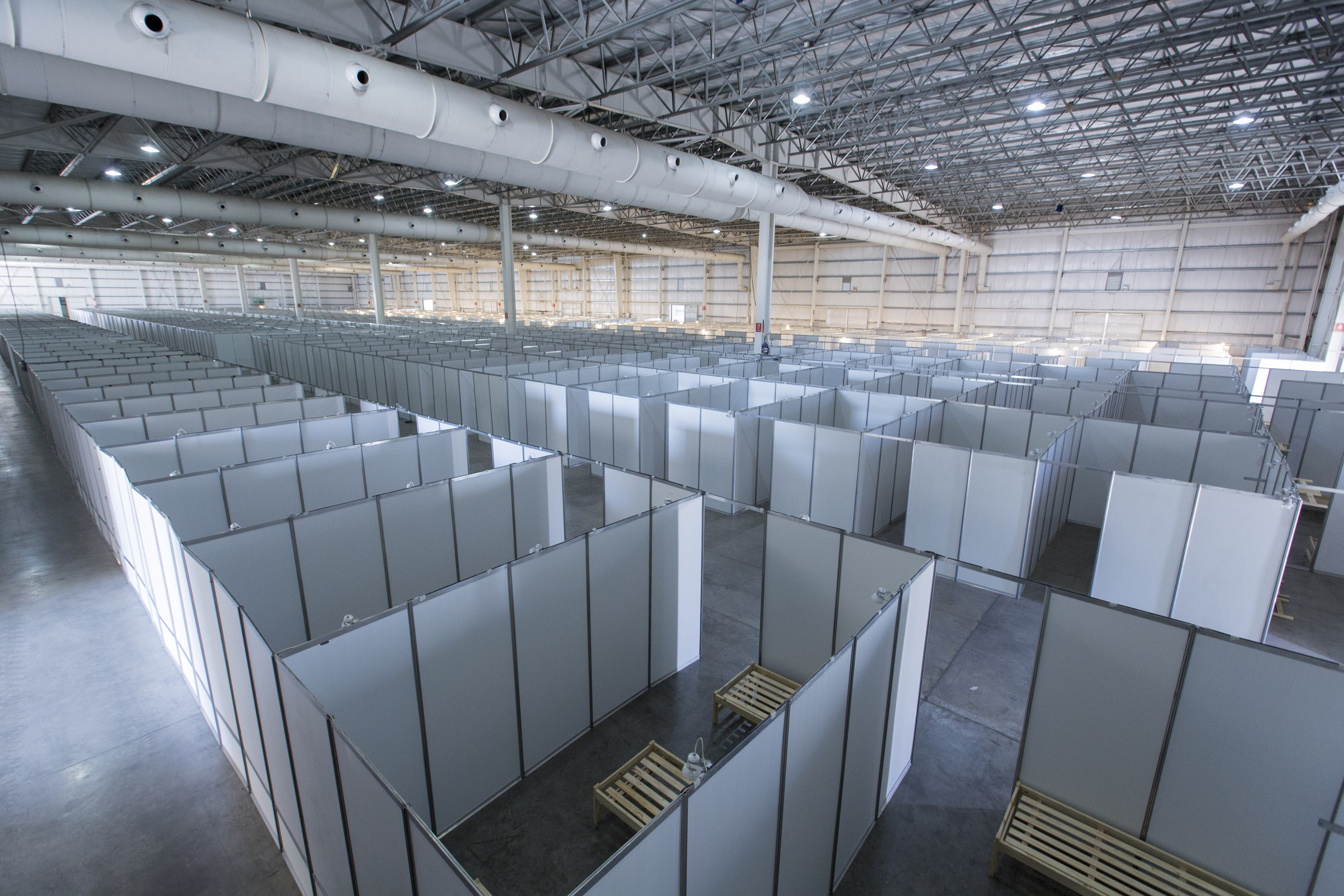
Field hospital built in Tecnópolis, Villa Martelli.

On 23 March 2020, Argentina's President Fernández asked the general secretary of the Chinese Communist Party, Xi Jinping, for 1,500 ventilators as Argentina had only 8,890 available. Previously, President Fernández announced the construction of eight emergency hospitals to deal with the pandemic on mid-March 2020. 2,452 non-hospital beds were made available to patients in the final stage of recovering from the disease from hospitals in the province of Buenos Aires.

During the pandemic, more than 400 health professionals were infected, making the 15 per cent of the total confirmed cases as of 19 April 2020. According to the Argentinian Intensive Care Society, there are only 1,350 physicians trained for that speciality. Later the Ministry of Health summoned different health professionals, making that number rise over 3,122. The province of Chaco had the worst rate of health professionals infected, with the 52 per cent of the total cases of that jurisdiction in April 2020.

Argentina's health system was also dealing with a Dengue fever outbreak, with more than 14,000 cases since 29 July 2019, and the worse measles outbreak since the end of its endemic circulation, after 174 cases and a death were confirmed since 2019.

Until 18 July 2020, there were 181,043 confirmed cases of influenza (down 64.4% versus the same period in 2019), 26,323 cases of pneumonia, 24,643 cases of bronchiolitis in children under 2 years (down 84% versus the same period in 2019), and 9,495 cases of severe acute respiratory infections. Regarding the circulation of respiratory viruses, adenovirus, parainfluenza, influenza B and influenza A predominated as of that date. Also, eight deaths from influenza were registered through that date, from which three of them also tested positive for SARS-CoV-2.

=== Economy ===
Due to the national lockdown, the economical activity suffered a collapse of nearly 10% in March 2020 according to a consultant firm. The highest drop was of the construction sector (32%) versus March 2019. Every economical sector suffered a collapse, with finance, commerce, manufacturing industry and mining being the most affected. The agriculture sector was the least affected, but overall the economic activity for the first trimester of 2020 accumulates a 5% contraction. It was expected that the extension of the lockdown beyond April 2020 would increase the collapse of the Argentinian economy. In March 2020, the primary fiscal deficit jumped to US$1,394 million, an 857% increase year-to-year. This was due to the public spending to combat the pandemic and the drop in tax collection due to low activity in a context of social isolation. In June 2020, industrial production fell 6.6% versus June 2019. This was better than the forecast announced by analysts and a smaller drop than in the previous months since the beginning of the pandemic.

President Fernández announced a 700 billion pesos (US$11.1 billion) stimulus package due to the pandemic, worth 2% of the country's GDP, and have focused on providing increased health spending, including for improvements in virus diagnostics, purchases of hospital equipment and construction of clinics and hospitals; support for workers and vulnerable groups, including through increased transfers to poor families, social security benefits (especially to low-income beneficiaries), unemployment insurance benefits, and payments to minimum-wage workers; support for hard-hit sectors, including an exemption from social security contributions, grants to cover payroll costs; and subsidised loans for construction-related activities; forbearance, including continued provision of utility services for households in arrears; and credit guarantees for bank lending to micro, small and medium enterprises (SMEs) for the production of foods and basic supplies. The country would also have to face its ninth sovereign default in history due to the recession.

Measures also have been aimed at encouraging bank lending through lower reserve requirements on bank lending to households and SMEs, regulations that limit banks' holdings of central bank paper to provide space for SME lending, temporary easing of bank provisioning needs and of bank loan classification rules, and a stay on both bank account closures due to bounced checks and credit denial to companies with payroll tax arrears.

According to a survey, approximately 143,000 SMEs were not able to pay salaries and fixed costs, even with government assistance, so they might had to borrow or increase their own capital contribution. 35,000 of these companies were considering to close their business.

The International Monetary Fund (IMF) reported that the COVID-19 crisis would plunge Argentina's GDP by 9.9 per cent, after the country's economy contracted by 5.4 per cent in first quarter of 2020, with unemployment rising over 10.4 per cent in the first three months of the year, before the lockdown started. Other reports also indicate that the economy might shrink between 10% and 12% during 2020.

Argentina's economy contracted a record 19.1% in the second quarter of 2020 versus the same period of 2019 as the pandemic reduced production and demand, though was slightly better than analyst forecasts. The previous record was held during the 1998–2002 Argentine great depression, with a 16.3% drop in 2002. The unemployment rate during the second quarter of 2020 jumped to 13.1%, up from the 10.6% rate that was held in the same period in 2019, reaching up to 26% in Mar del Plata, a tourism-centered city. It was the highest unemployment rate since 2004.

After the reopening of June 2021, the economy in Argentina expanded more than expected, growing 10.8 percent in June compared versus 2020 after activity declined during April–May 2021.

=== Travel ===
After announced a mandatory quarantine to every person that returned to Argentina from highly affected countries, the government closed its borders, ports, and suspended flights. The Argentina 2000 airports signed an agreement with the Ministry of Science, Technology and Innovation to reimburse 100% of the charges originated by the air cargo that enters the country that are directly or indirectly related to the COVID-19.

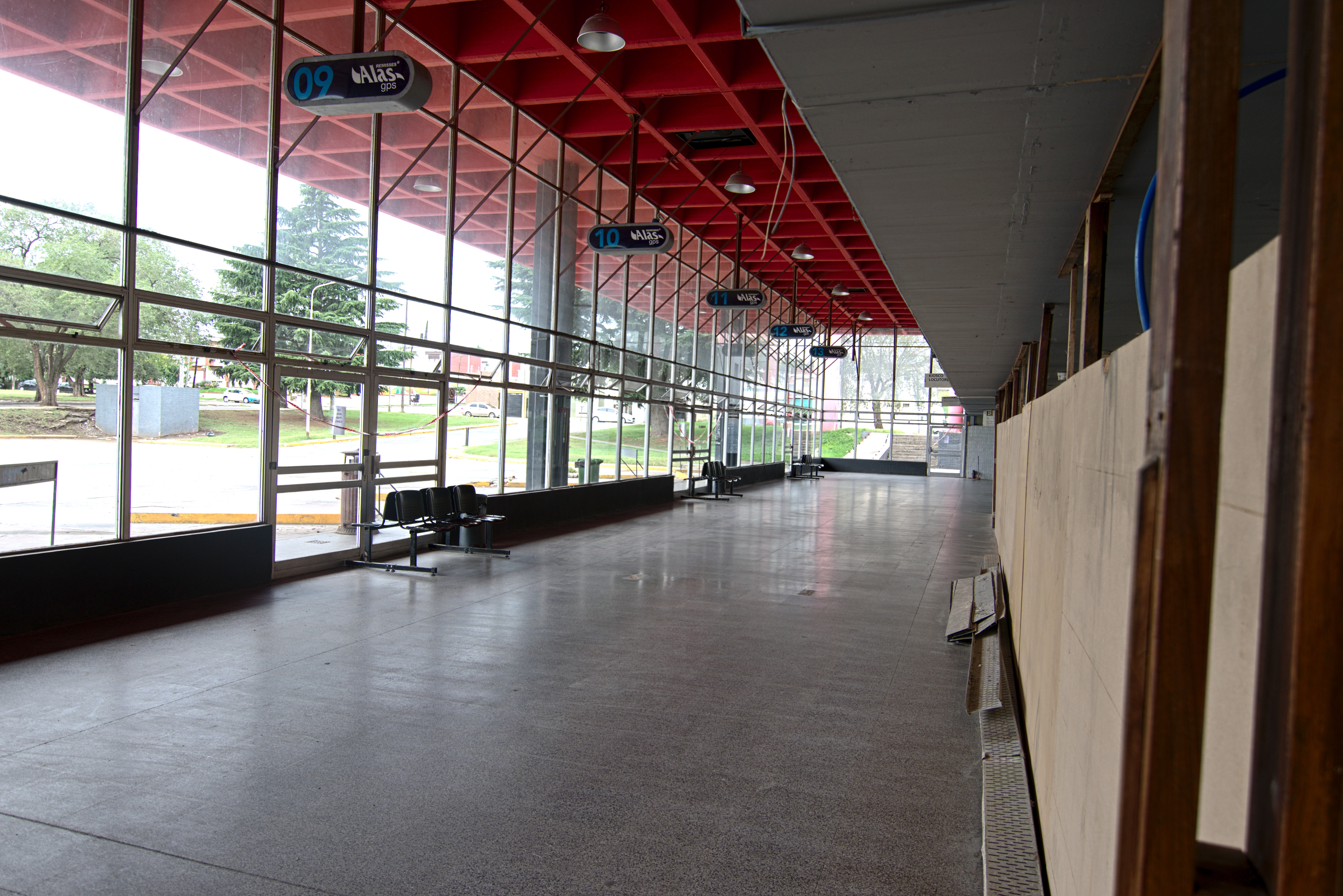
An empty bus station in Tandil in late March 2020.

Since 1 April 2020, the government allowed the return of Argentine residents stranded abroad, with a maximum of 700 passengers per day. Seven border crossings opened temporarily to allow the repatriation of Argentina's inhabitants. Hotels for local tourism closed too, being only open to people staying in a situation of lockdown though the time it lasts. Several tourism-related cities also saw a massive migration from Argentine residents after the announcement of the national lockdown. It was severely criticised by the government.

According to the International Air Transport Association (IATA), Argentina was expected to loosen its travel ban earlier than the date that was previously announced by the government (1 September 2020). Later, it was announced that the government was planning to authorise foreign flights with a maximum passenger capacity of 70%, as soon as mid-August 2020. By September 2020, government announced regular flights could return on the next month. Following this travel ban, one of the most strict in the world, airline LATAM Argentina closed definitely on 17 June 2020, due to "the conditions of the local industry, aggravated by the pandemic".

During the last week of July 2020, flag carrier airline Aerolíneas Argentinas sold over 188 thousand tickets, with the company reporting that 54 per cent of passengers bought their tickets to travel from December 2020 to March 2021, while another 27 per cent did so to travel between September and November 2020.

On 22 September 2020, low-cost carriers such as Flybondi, JetSmart Argentina, and legacy airline Aerolíneas Argentinas confirmed that they had moved the dates of their flights with 12 October as the expected restart date, while the Ministry of Transport assured that regular domestic flights would resume in November 2020. Two days later, it was announced that American Airlines would resume its daily flights to Miami since 7 October 2020, on a special flights schedule including two weekly flights to Madrid and Santiago de Chile, three flights a month to New York City, four weekly flights to São Paulo, and flights to Lima (three per month) and Asunción (two per month).

The country resumed regular domestic flights on 22 October 2020 after an interruption of seven months, with protocols requiring passengers to wear face-masks and have travel certificates. Some provinces also required COVID-19 tests with negative result before boarding aircraft or arriving.

On 26 December 2020, the country limited the entry to the country again due to the new COVID-19 strains across the globe, and the rising of infections. The measures were expected to last until 28 January 2021. This was expected to last until September 2021.

=== Social impact ===
Argentina was reported to be among the countries in the region whose population adhered to the lockdown the most. Apple reported a decrease of 83 per cent on vehicular mobility through 26 April 2020, although 4,900 people were arrested across the country for violating the lockdown. According to Google, since the lockdown, people movement in restaurants, shopping centers, cinemas and museums dropped by 86 per cent, the presence of mobile phones on public transportation dropped 80 per cent, and in offices a 57 per cent. The presence in residential zones increased by 27 per cent.

==== Education ====
Schools and universities closed indefinitely after the president's announcement of the lockdown. In response to the pandemic, classes moved to online distance learning. 14 million students have been affected by the school closures. Later, the government announced that was evaluating how they would open the schools in the future, and that they were working on the distribution of netbooks to students that do not have access to computers, with the criteria for distributing them based on socioeconomic indicators.

On 9 June 2020, the Ministry of Education expressed that 85 per cent of students would be able to return to classes in August, though with special hygiene measures in place, but schools in the Greater Buenos Aires area would have to wait until infections in the region begin to drop off. Three months later, on 3 August 2020, the Ministry of Education confirmed that the provinces of Catamarca, San Juan and Santiago del Estero would begin a process of returning to class under a system that would involve dividing students into groups that could attend classrooms in weekly shifts. On that day, schools of Catamarca and Santiago del Estero opened with directive, administrative and teaching personnel from the last years of primary and secondary levels, that were expected to prepare protocols to restart classes on 18 August 2020. Over 10,000 students in San Juan became the first to return to face-to-face classes through social distancing on 10 August 2020. The Minister of Education, Nicolás Trotta, also announced that classes would end throughout the country in December 2020 as expected.

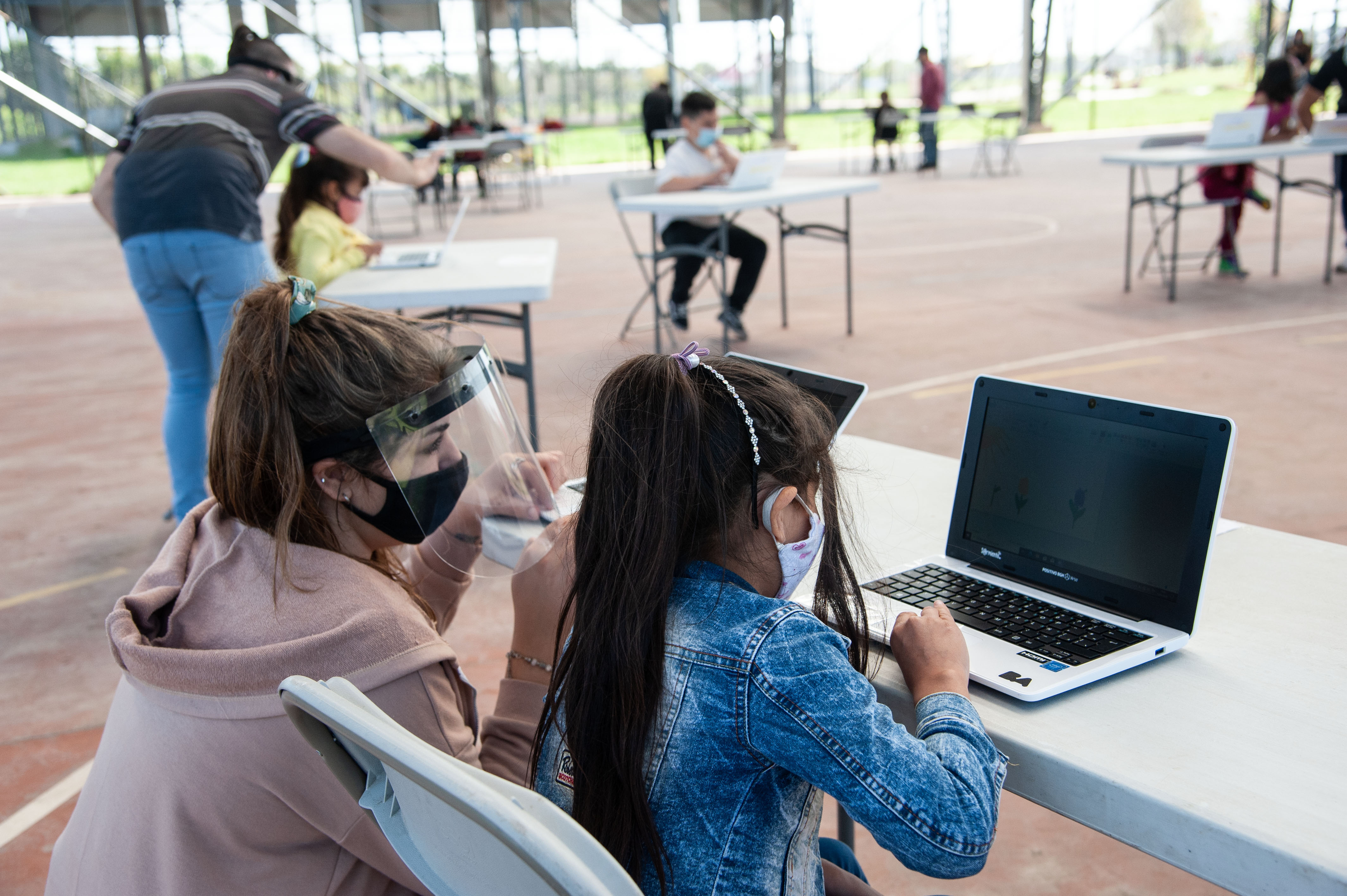
School in the City of Buenos Aires, October 2020.

During October 2020, the opening of educational institutions was confirmed by the Government of the City of Buenos Aires. Students of the last years of primary and secondary public schools would be able to assist voluntarily to the institutions, with protocols indicating that there will not be more than 10 people together, with an assistance of between two and four days per week, from one to four hours, in outdoor spaces. Private schools in the City of Buenos Aires were also allowed to return to face-to-face activities since 16 October 2020. One week later, the first case of a COVID-19 positive school worker was confirmed in a school in Barracas, Buenos Aires, where the school had to close due to the protocols. School activities in the Province of Buenos Aires were also confirmed by governor Kicillof to begin in October in 24 municipalities, and finally restarted for senior year students in 15 small districts, while in other 79 bigger districts only "rebonding" school activities were allowed. A private report estimated in November that 34% of Argentine students were allowed to attend these "rebonding" school activities, while 1% of them were in fact attending in-person classes at the time.

In November 2020, the City of Buenos Aires allowed a progressive back to school for all students, and then announced that the 2021 school year would start earlier than usual, on 17 February 2020, with teachers unions protesting against the reopening of schools. The Province of Buenos Aires allowed school activities in 32 bigger districts during November 2020.

Finally, on 17 February 2021, schools re-opened to students in five out of the 24 jurisdictions.

==== Criminality ====
During the pandemic, robberies and homicide went down during the lockdown in most of the country, and increased again as time passed and some restrictions were lifted. In the City of Buenos Aires, under the strictest lockdown, crime went down a 48 per cent during the first quarter of the year, and a 56 per cent during July 2020, but violence on those crimes increased. In the Province of Buenos Aires, also under strict lockdown, 5,980 armed thefts were reported during the first 97 days of the lockdown, against 13,878 on the same period of the previous year. Also, 201 murders (16 less than in 2019), and 120 attacks with injured victims (against 197 from the previous year) were reported.

In Greater Buenos Aires, an increase in crimes committed by people with no previous record was seen. They were qualified as "survival crime[s]" by the Minister of Security of the province, Sergio Berni. To deal with this increase in crime, an "Immediate Response Taskforce" was created for the Federal Police, and gendarmes were deployed in the area. The national Minister of Security, Sabina Frederic, stated that, even though in the first days of lockdown crime had gone down a lot, as the health precautions relaxed, crime increased, especially the violence used.

In the Buenos Aires' Atlantic coast, a popular summertime vacation place, there was a wave of thefts against summer houses. This was fuelled by the lockdown and how difficult it was for the house owners (most of them from Greater Buenos Aires) to access their properties and reinforce security.

On 7 September 2020, Buenos Aires Provincial Police protests spiked through the province, fuelled by having to deal with COVID-19 in the front line, while not being provided any personal protective equipment and earning a monthly minimum wage of 40,000 pesos (about 430 U.S. dollars), with overtime being paid at 50 pesos (2,30 U.S. dollars) per hour. Police stopped patrolling, responding only to urgent 911 emergency calls.

==== Slums ====
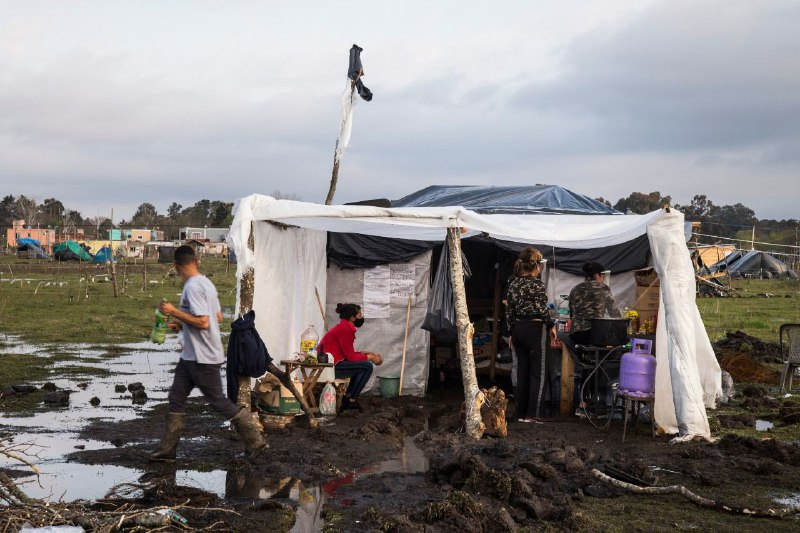
Slum created after a land occupation in Guernica, Buenos Aires.

Argentina has a long-standing housing access and slums problem, which was only worsened by the pandemic. Special testing and containment efforts had to be put in place in lower-income neighbourhoods, mostly after outbreaks in Buenos Aires (Villa 31 and Barrio Mujica) and Quilmes (Villa Azul and Villa Itatí) shantytowns. These areas, with scarce access to water and ventilation, as well as overcrowding, make complying to the mandatory lockdown difficult and facilitate the COVID-19 rapid spread. The DetectAr testing campaign in Buenos Aires' slums included research of housing conditions and the taking of samples in common areas (such as meal centers) for RT-qPCR tests, which showed high SARS-CoV-2 prevalence. The COVID-19 crisis also increased "land occupations" by social movements, in which they forcefully appropriated lands to establish slums. This was also favoured by laws suspending evictions as a relief measure for the crisis.

It has been estimated that, by September 2020, 4,300 hectares (11,000 acres) of both private and public lands had been usurped in the Buenos Aires Province, the most notable one being located in Guernica, comprising about 100 hectares (250 acres). Housing projects, which had been unfinished for years, were also occupied in some areas. This sparkled political criticism both from the insides of the government, as well from the political opposition, with the Security Minister of the Province of Buenos Aires suggesting that occupations were organised by social movements from inside the governing coalition. Justice started investigations on this possible involvement. Some government members initially refused evictions of occupied land, but days later turned into a more critical view. Other sectors of society claimed occupations should not be evicted, and that unused lands should be distributed to the most needed.

In the Patagonia region, occupations by people referencing themselves as Mapuches also surged amid the pandemic. One of a 480 hectares (1,200 acres) National Parks area in Villa Mascardi received the biggest national media attention. This caused demonstrations of people against the occupation, which ended in the National Minister of Security starting legal complaints against the demonstrators.

==== Public transportation ====
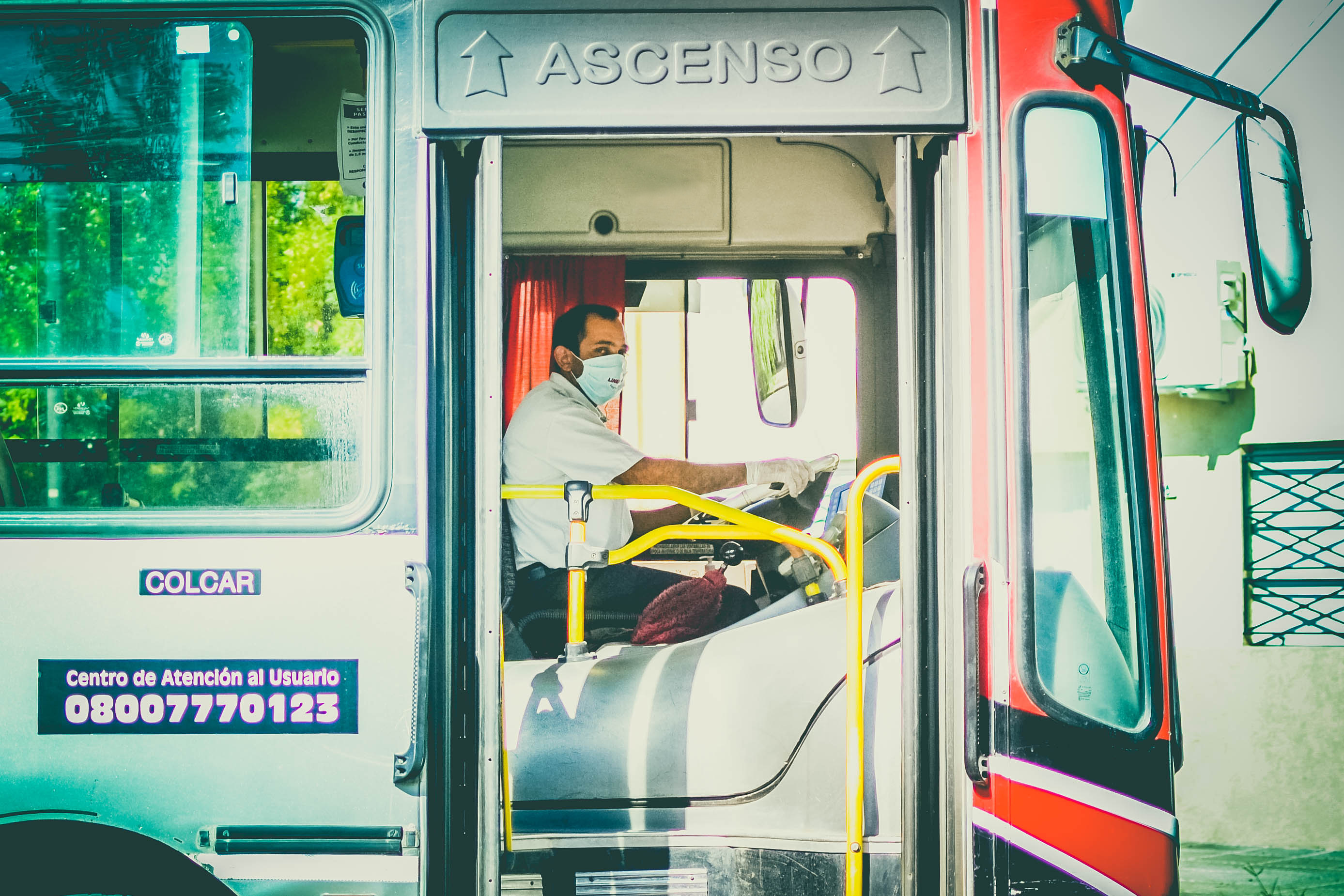
A bus driver with a face mask in Argentina.

The government imposed a series of measurements for public transportation (taxis, buses and train services) focused on the hygiene of the units and recommendation of travel only if it's essential. Public transportation services offered a Saturday-schedule until the start of the "administrated lockdown" on 13 April 2020. Since this day, all public transportation services returned to the normal schedules, but still maintaining the hygiene measures to prevent the spread of the virus.

On 4 May 2020, the government announced a new protocol that orders that public transportation will only occupy 60 per cent of its capacity. The combis and mini-buses services will also begin to work again since the begin of the mandatory lockdown.

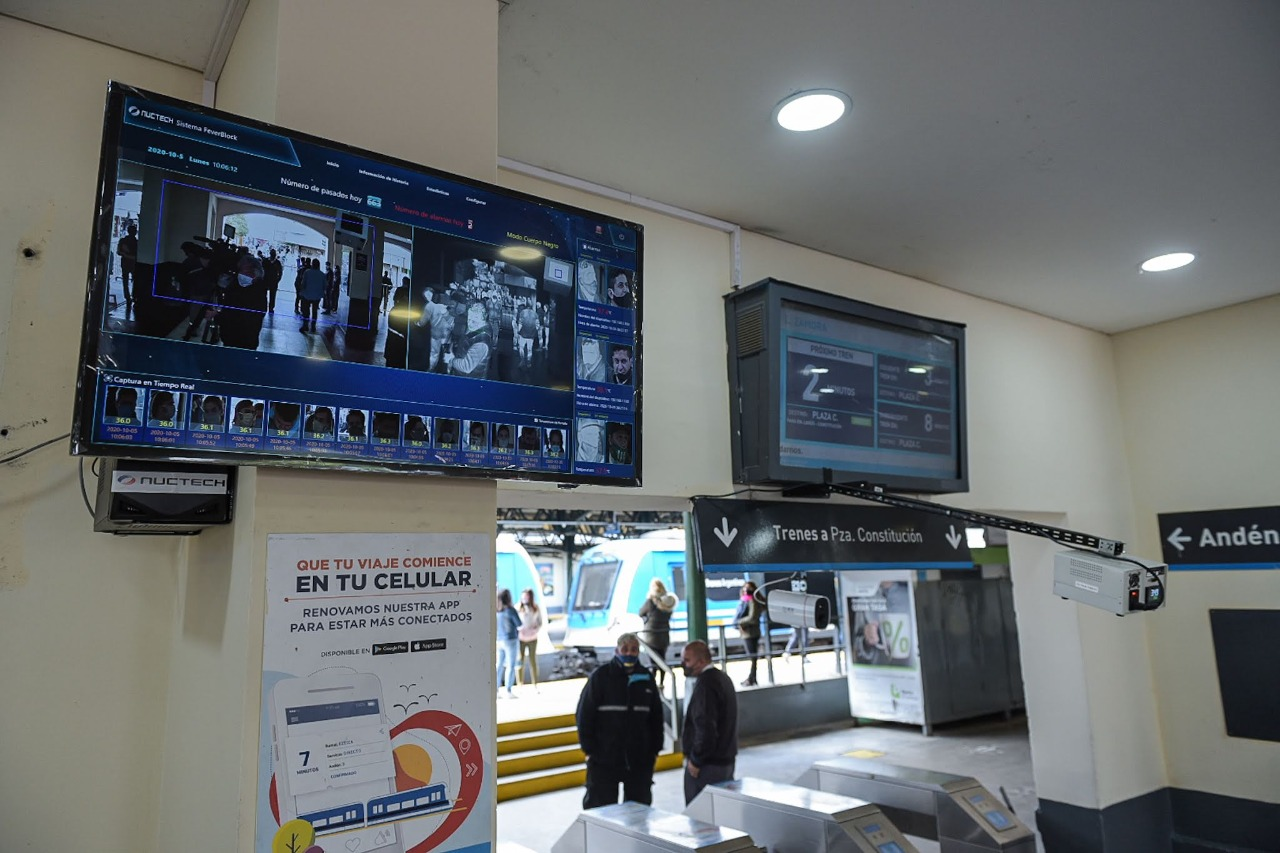
Thermal cameras installed in the Lomas de Zamora train station.

After the use of public transportation in Greater Buenos Aires grew by 60 per cent in early June 2020, the government announced new measures to allow only "essential workers" for the use of train, bus and underground services. Train passengers were forced to reserve seats to travel since 29 June 2020. Under the lockdown tightening that came into effect on 1 July 2020, public transportation use in Greater Buenos Aires dropped by 30 per cent (around 300,000 passengers) on the first days compared versus the previous week.

On 4 August 2020, the Sarmiento Line of train interrupted its service after COVID-19 cases were detected among its employees. 36 workers tested positive for the virus and 130 people had to be isolated. Since the beginning of the pandemic, the line accumulated 56 confirmed cases of COVID-19 to that date.

==== Human rights ====
As for the human rights situation, claims were made on police brutality, an increase of domestic violence, human trafficking, and the right to freedom of movement. Particularly, two cases of police brutality received substantial attention on national media: the death of Luis Espinoza, who was killed by the Tucumán Provincial Police during a control of lockdown abidance, and the disappearance of Facundo Astudillo Castro, who was later found dead near Bahía Blanca, after being stopped several times by the Buenos Aires Provincial Police for not complying with the lockdown measures. Police involvement in the latter is suspected but has yet not been proven. The UN made claims to the Argentine government on these cases.

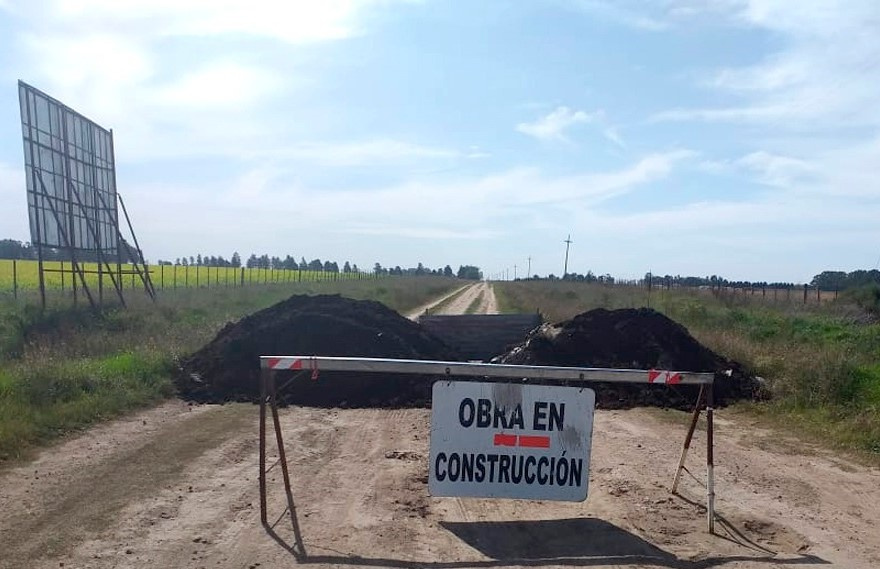
Barricade in Coronel Suárez, Buenos Aires.

Mobility was heavily restricted, with strict checkpoints in province's borders, which allowed entrance only on a limited number of cases with a permit. Dirt barricades were built in some cities' entrances. This led to cases of citizens not being able to greet a family member on their deathbed despite having the required permits, and patients dying due to ambulances not being allowed to enter another province. Some people had to camp in the provincial borders. It was estimated that around 8,000 people were stranded trying to access the Formosa Province, which led to a ruling of the Supreme Court of Argentina stating they should be granted access. Truck drivers also criticised the roadblocks and lockdown control measures in roads, stating they had to wait for up to 20 hours in police checkpoints, and considering the measures as inhumane, among other reasons, for being unable to make bathroom stops for hours.

Commercial flights were restricted from April to the end of October 2020, following one of the longest lockdowns worldwide, and causing criticism from the International Air Transport Association.

==== Media ====
Since the start of the national lockdown, broadcast television saw a 30 per cent increase of viewership during the week between 17 and 22 March 2020. The networks increased the airtime of talk shows and news programming, while reality shows were still in production.

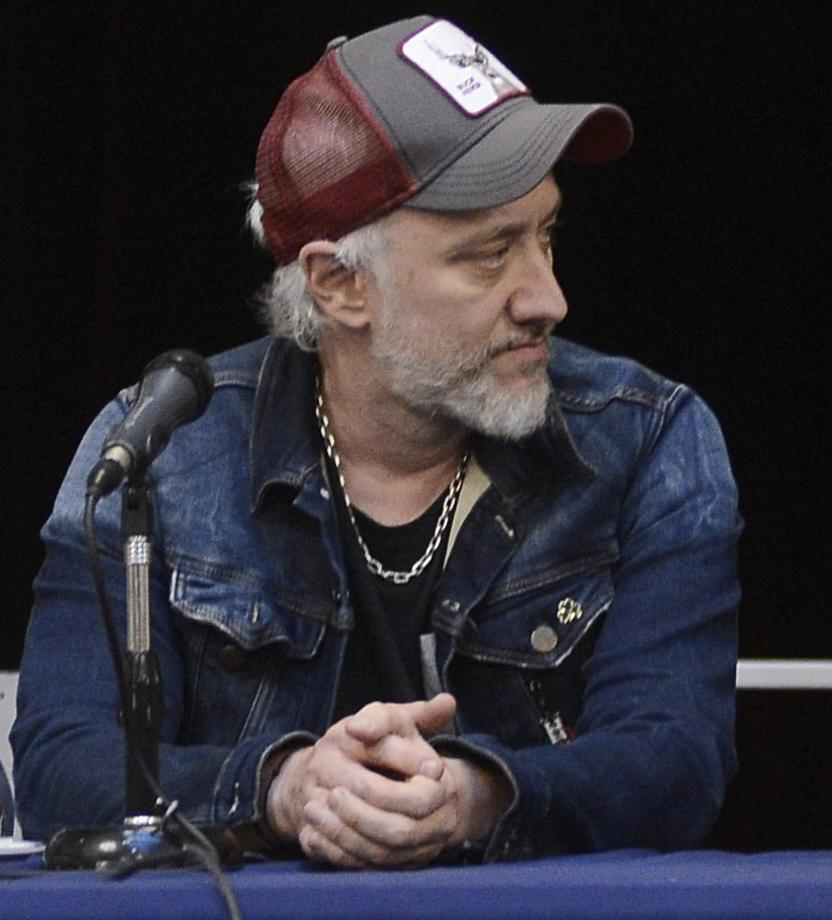
Andy Kusnetzoff, host of PH: Podemos Hablar (Telefe) tested positive for the virus in August 2020.

A fundraising special show aimed to the Red Cross for supplying hospitals and health centers aired throughout all six broadcast networks (América TV, Televisión Pública, El Nueve, Telefe, El Trece and Net TV) on 5 April 2020. The show, called "United for Argentina", included celebrities and famous people from the Argentine media. Donations reached a total of 87,938,624 Argentine pesos (ARS).

The only telenovela that was airing on broadcast television before the beginning of the pandemic, Separadas (from El Trece), was removed from the schedule after its 19 March 2020 airing and production was suspended temporarily. Two months later, producing company Pol-ka definitely cancelled the show due to "economic reasons", leaving Argentine television without any scripted programming.

The first cases of COVID-19 reached Argentine television in June 2020. The first confirmed case was from El Nueve's sports journalist Guillermo Ferro. Later, three producers from Telefe's El Precio Justo were also diagnosed, making the show to enter on hiatus and schedule reruns to air instead. El Precio Justo's hostess Lizy Tagliani later reported that she was diagnosed positive for COVID-19. Telefe also announced that talk show Cortá por Lozano would be broadcast with the hostess and panellists from their homes as a preventive measure. An employee from América TV was also diagnosed with COVID-19 on 18 June 2020. On 27 June 2020, news channel C5N implemented a protocol to prevent new infections after one of their journalists, Fernanda Arena, tested positive for COVID-19.

Through the beginning of September, several journalists, hosts, crew and famous personalities from television and radio tested positive for the virus. Santiago del Moro, Catherine Fulop, Guido Kaczka, Andy Kusnetzoff, Alejandro Fantino, Baby Etchecopar, Eduardo Feinmann, Nicole Neumann and Maju Lozano were among the people from the Argentine media that have been tested positive.

==== Sports ====
On 12 March 2020, FIFA announced that the first two rounds of the South American qualification for the 2022 World Cup due to take place during that month were postponed to later dates. The same day, CONMEBOL announced that the Copa Libertadores would be temporarily suspended. Later, on 17 March 2020, CONMEBOL announced that the 2020 edition of Copa América was postponed to 2021.

On 13 March, the 2020 running of Rally Argentina was postponed. The MotoGP's Gran Premio Motul de la Republica Argentina was also scheduled to take place during the year but was later cancelled on 31 July.

On 15 March 2020, President Fernández announced that, among other measures, he intended to keep football matches ongoing but without audience. The first match suspended by the Argentine Football Association (AFA) was between Club Atlético Independiente and Club Villa Mitre from the Copa Argentina. It was supposed to be played on 17 March, but was moved to 1 April 2020. On that same day, every football category was suspended indefinitely, being the match between Club Atlético Colón and Rosario Central (for the Superliga) the last played, on 16 March 2020.

After months of uncertainty, a tentative date for the return of football was announced. It was expected that since 31 July 2020, the teams would be able to return to practice after the players, coaching staff and club employees are tested, following the steps that were taken in European football, making the tournament to return on mid-September. Later, on 4 August 2020, the Argentine Football Association announced that after health protocols were approved by the government, practices of the Men's First Division and Women's First Division would definitely return on 10 August, later being joined by the second division on 2 September and the rest of the categories on 7 September 2020. Before returning to practice, several clubs such as Boca Juniors, River Plate, Independiente, Racing, San Lorenzo and Vélez Sársfield, among others, tested its players with positive results for COVID-19.

On 18 August 2021, the Minister of Tourism and Sports, Matías Lammens, announced that football with spectators would return between late September and early October, with sporting venues limited to reach 30 percent capacity.

== See also ==
- COVID-19 pandemic by country and territory
- COVID-19 pandemic in South America
- COVID-19 misinformation
- 2020 in Argentina
- 2021 in Argentina
- COVID-19 vaccination in Argentina
- Living with COVID-19
