= Horacio =

Horacio a masculine given name, is a variant of Horace. The given name Horacio is found sporadically throughout all of Latin America. Horacio is a boy's name with Latin origins said to mean 'timekeeper'.

The Portuguese spelling is Horácio. A related name is Horatio.

== People with the name ==
- Horacio Accavallo (1934–2022), Argentine boxer
- Horacio Agulla (born 1984), Argentine rugby player
- Horacio Ahuett Garza (born 1964), Mexican engineer
- Horacio Allegue (born 1972), Spanish rower
- Horacio Altuna (born 1941), Argentine comics artist
- Horacio Álvarez Mesa (1881–1936), Spanish politician, lawyer and journalist
- Horacio Ameli (born 1974), Argentine footballer
- Horacio Anasagasti (1879–1932), Argentine engineer
- Horacio Marcelo Arce (born 1970), Argentine footballer
- Horacio Arruda (born 1960), Canadian physician
- Horacio Badaraco (1901–1946), Argentine anarchist and journalist
- Horacio Baldessari (born 1958), Argentine footballer
- Horacio Barrionuevo (born 1939), Argentine footballer
- Horacio Ernesto Benites Astoul (1933–2016), prelate of the Roman Catholic Church
- Horacio Bernardo (born 1976), Uruguayan writer
- Horacio Bocaranda (born 1965), Venezuelan–American TV and film director
- Horacio Bongiovanni (born 1950), Argentine footballer
- Horacio Cabrera (born 1958), Cuban rower
- Horacio Calcaterra (born 1989), Argentine footballer who plays for Peru
- Horacio Campi (1917–?), Argentine sailor
- Horacio Carabelli (born 1968), Uruguayan sailor and engineer
- Horacio Carbonari (born 1974), Argentine footballer
- Horacio Carbonetti (born 1947), Argentine golfer
- Horacio Cardo (1944–2018), Argentine painter and illustrator
- Horacio Cardozo (born 1979), Argentine footballer
- Horacio Carochi (1586–1666), Italian Jesuit priest and grammarian
- Horacio Cartes (born 1956), Paraguayan politician and businessman
- Horacio Casarín (1918–2005), Mexican footballer
- Horacio Casco (1868–1931), Argentine fencer
- Horacio Castellanos Moya (born 1957), Honduran writer
- Horacio Cervantes (born 1981), Mexican footballer
- Horacio Chiorazzo (born 1976), Argentine footballer
- Horacio Cifuentes (born 1998), Argentine table tennis player
- Horacio Colombo (born 1934), Argentine basketball player
- Horacio Coppola (1906–2012), Argentine photographer and filmmaker
- Horacio Cordero (born 1950), Argentine footballer
- Horacio Cordero (painter) (1945–2014), 10th Marquis de Sosa, Argentine painter
- Horacio d'Almeida (born 1988), French volleyball player
- Horacio de Almeida (born 1975), Timor-Leste official
- Horacio de la Costa (1916–1977), Filipino Jesuit priest, historian and academic
- Horacio de la Iglesia (fl. from 2000), Argentine-born biologist
- Horacio de la Peña (born 1966), tennis player from Argentina
- Horacio de la Vega (born 1975), Mexican modern pentathlete and sports administrator
- Horacio Díaz Luco (1943–2025), Chilean footballer
- Horacio Duarte Olivares (born 1971), Mexican politician
- Horacio Echevarrieta (1870–1963), Spanish businessman and politician
- Horacio Elizondo (born 1963), Argentine football referee
- Horacio Erpen (born 1981), Argentine association footballer
- Horacio Esteves (1941–1996), Venezuelan sprinter
- Horacio Estol (fl. 1944–1959), Argentinian journalist in New York
- Horacio Estrada (born 1975), Venezuelan baseball player
- Horacio Etchegoyen (1919–2016), Argentine psychoanalyst
- Horacio Farach (fl. 1965–2004), Argentine physicist
- Horacio Ferrer (1933–2014), Uruguayan-Argentine poet
- Horacio Flores (born 1951), Mexican sprint canoer
- Horacio Fontova (1946–2020), Argentine actor
- Horacio Franco (born 1963), Mexican musician
- Horacio Gallardo (born 1981), Bolivian road bicycle racer
- Horacio García (born 1990), Mexican boxer
- Horacio García (sailor) (1931–2015), Uruguayan dinghy sailor
- Horacio Garza Garza (fl. from 1991), Mexican politician
- Horacio Gómez Bolaños (1930–1999), Mexican actor
- Horacio González (1944–2021), Argentine teacher and essayist
- Horacio Gramajo (1900–1943), Argentine bobsledder
- Horacio Guarany (1925–2017), Argentine folklore singer
- Horacio Gutiérrez (born 1948), Cuban-American classical pianist
- Horacio Guzmán (1913–1992), Argentine lawyer and politician
- Horacio Hasse (born 1940), Guatemalan footballer
- Horacio "El Negro" Hernández (born 1963), Cuban drummer and percussionist
- Horacio Hidrovo Peñaherrera (1931–2012), Ecuadorian poet
- Horacio Hidrovo Velásquez (1902–1962), Ecuadorian poet
- Horacio Humoller (born 1966), Argentine footballer
- Horacio Iglesias (1942–2004), Argentine swimmer
- Horacio Iglesias (bobsleigh) (1903-unknown), Argentine bobsledder
- Horacio Jaunarena (born 1942), Argentine politician
- Horacio Lavandera (born 1984), Argentine pianist
- Horacio LeDon (born 1967), Cuban American businessman
- Horacio Tomás Liendo (1924–2007), Argentinian military officer
- Horacio Llamas (born 1973), Mexican basketball player
- Horacio López (born 1961), Uruguayan athlete, basketball player and writer
- Horacio López Salgado (born 1948), Mexican footballer
- Horacio Lores (born 1939), Argentine politician
- Horacio Lugo (born 1966), Argentine footballer
- Horacio Macedo Esquivel (born 1963), Mexican footballer
- Horacio Malvicino (1929–2023), Argentinian musician
- Horacio Mancilla (fl. from 1991), Mexican voice actor and writer
- Horacio Martínez, several people
- Horacio Massaccesi (born 1948), Argentine politician
- Horacio Matarasso (born 1967), Argentine ornithologist
- Horacio Matuszyczk (born 1961), Argentine footballer
- Horacio Mendizábal (1847–1871), Argentine poet, translator and activist
- Horacio Miranda (born 1931), Filipino sports shooter
- Horacio Montemurro (born 1962), Argentine footballer
- Horacio Monti (1911–unknown), Argentine sailor
- Horacio Morales Jr. (1943–2012), Filipino economist and politician
- Horacio Moráles (1943–2021), Argentine footballer
- Horacio Muñoz (1896–1976), Chilean footballer
- Horacio Muratore (1951–2026), Argentine basketball executive
- Horacio Nava (born 1982), Mexican race walker
- Horacio Neumann (1946–2008), Argentine footballer
- Horacio Olivo (1933–2016), Puerto Rican actor and comedian
- Horacio Orzán (born 1988), Argentine footballer
- Horacio Pacheco (born 1983), Bolivian football manager
- Horacio Pagani (disambiguation), several people
- Horacio Pancheri (born 1982), Argentine actor and model
- Horacio Peña (disambiguation), several people
- Horacio Peralta (born 1982), Uruguayan footballer
- Horacio Perdomo (born 1960), Uruguayan basketball player
- Horacio Piña (born 1945), Mexican baseball player
- Horacio Podestá (1911–1999), Argentine rower
- Horacio Quiroga (1878–1937), Uruguayan author and writer
- Horacio Ramiro González (born 1956), Argentine politician
- Horacio Rodríguez Larreta (born 1965), Argentine economist and politician
- Horacio A. Rega Molina (1899–1957), Argentine poet
- Horacio Rosatti (born 1956), Argentine lawyer, politician and judge
- Horacio D. Rozanski (born c. 1968), Argentine-born American businessman
- Horace François Bastien Sébastiani de La Porta (1771–1851), French general, diplomat, and politician
- Horacio Seeber (1907–1972), sailor from Argentina
- Horacio Sequeira (born 1995), Uruguayan footballer
- Horacio Serpa (1943–2020), Colombian lawyer and politician
- Horacio Siburu (1922–2000), Argentine modern pentathlete
- Horacio Sicilia (born 1974), Argentine rower
- Horacio Simaldone (born 1958), Argentine footballer
- Horacio Sánchez (born 1953), Mexican footballer
- Chango Spasiuk (Horacio Spasiuk, born 1968), Argentine chamamé musician and accordion player
- Horacio A. Tenorio (1935–2021), Mexican general authority in the Church of Jesus Christ of Latter-day Saints
- Horacio Terra Arocena (1894–1985), Uruguayan architect and politician
- Horacio Tijanovich (born 1996), Argentine footballer
- Horacio Troche (1935–2014), Uruguayan footballer
- Horacio Usandizaga (1940–2026), or El Vasco, Argentine politician
- Horacio Vaggione (born 1943), Argentinian composer
- Horacio Valenzuela (born 1954), Chilean prelate of the Catholic Church
- Horacio Vásquez (1860–1936), Dominican Republic general and politician
- Horacio Vázquez-Rial (1947–2012), Argentine-born writer and translator
- Horacio Verbitsky (born 1942), Argentine investigative journalist and author
- Horacio Villafañe (1963–2011), Argentine musician, singer and songwriter
- Horacio Villalobos (born 1970), Mexican TV host and actor
- Horacio White (1927–2017), Argentine swimmer
- Horacio Zeballos (born 1985), Argentine tennis player

== People with the name Horácio ==
- Horácio de Faria (born 1947), Portuguese footballer
- Horácio de Matos (1882–1931), Brazilian politician and colonel
- Horácio Gonçalves (born 1962), Portuguese footballer
- Horácio Macedo (born 1930), Portuguese rally driver
- Horácio Roque (1944–2010), Portuguese financier and businessman

== Fictional characters ==
- Horácio, a baby Tyrannosaurus rex, in the Brazilian comic strip Horacio's World

== See also ==
- Horatio
