= Orazio =

Orazio is a male given name of Italian origin, derived from the Latin name (nomen) Horatius, from the Roman gens (clan) Horatia.

People with this given name include:

- Orazio degli Albizzi (1610–1676), Roman Catholic bishop
- Orazio Alfani (c. 1510–1583), Italian painter
- Orazio Antinori (1811–1882), Italian explorer and zoologist
- Orazio Arancio (born 1967), Italian former rugby union player and current coach and sports director
- Orazio Attanasio (born 1959), Italian economist and professor
- Orazio Bacci (1864–1917), Italian politician
- Orazio di Giampaolo Baglioni (1493–1528), Italian aristocrat and condottiero (mercenary commander)
- Orazio Bassani (died 1615), Italian musician and composer
- Orazio Benevoli (1605–1672), Italian composer
- Orazio Bernardini (1899–1967), Italian admiral
- Orazio Filippo Bianchi (1680–1757), Italian lawyer and classical scholar
- Orazio Bianchi, Italian Baroque painter
- Orazio Antonio Bologna (born 1945), Italian classical philologist and poet
- Orazio Borgianni (c. 1575–1616), Italian painter and etcher
- Orazio Brunetti (1630–?), Italian engraver and painter
- Orazio Bruni (born c. 1630), Italian engraver
- Orazio Cambiasi, 16th-century Italian painter
- Orazio Comes (1848–1917), Italian botanist
- Orazio Costa (1911–1999), Italian theatre director
- Orazio Cremona (born 1989), South African shot putter
- Orazio Fagone (born 1968), Italian sledge hockey player and former speed skater
- Orazio Falconieri (died 1664), Italian nobleman
- Orazio Fantasia (born 1995), Australian rules footballer
- Orazio Farinati (1559–1616), Italian painter
- Orazio Farnese, Duke of Castro (1532–1553), husband of Diane de France
- Orazio de Ferrari (1606–1657), Italian painter
- Orazio Fidani (1610–1656), Italian painter
- Orazio Giovan Battista Ravaschieri Fieschi (died 1645), Prince of Belmonte and patrician of Genoa
- Orazio Fontana (1510–1571), Italian painter
- Orazio Frezza, 17th-century Italian painter
- Orazio Fumagalli (1921–2004), Italian sculptor
- Orazio Gaigher (1870–1938), Italian-Austrian painter and illustrator
- Orazio Gentileschi (1563–1639), Italian painter
- Orazio Giaccio, 17th-century Italian composer
- Orazio Giraldi (died 1617), Roman Catholic priest
- Orazio Giustiniani (1580–1649), Italian Roman Catholic cardinal
- Orazio Grassi (1583–1654), Italian mathematician, astronomer and architect
- Orazio Greco, 16th-century Roman Catholic priest
- Orazio Costante Grossoni (1867–1952), Italian sculptor
- Orazio Ludovisi (1561–1640), Italian nobleman, military commander, patrician of Bologna; brother of Pope Gregory XV
- Orazio Maffei (1580–1609), Roman Catholic cardinal
- Orazio Mariani (1915–1981), Italian sprinter
- Orazio Marinali (1643–1720), Italian sculptor
- Orazio Marucchi (1852–1931), Italian archaeologist
- Orazio Michi (1594–1641), Italian composer and harpist
- Orazio Minimi (1646–1701), Roman Catholic priest
- Orazio Mochi (1571–1625), Italian sculptor
- Orazio Annibale della Molara (1585–1643), Roman Catholic bishop
- Orazio Di Negro (1809–1872), Italian politician and admiral
- Orazio Orazi (1848–1912), Italian painter
- Orazio Orlando (1933–1990), Italian actor
- Orazio Pannitteri (born 1999), Italian footballer
- Orazio Pierozzi (1884–1919), Italian World War I flying ace
- Orazio Porta, 16th-century painter
- Orazio Querci (1875–1970), Italian entomologist
- Orazio Satta Puliga (1910–1974), Italian automobile designer
- Orazio Rancati (1940–2023), Italian footballer
- Orazio Rapari (1544–1595), Roman Catholic bishop
- Orazio Riminaldi (1586–1631), Italian painter
- Orazio Romanzi (born 1970), Italian racewalker
- Orazio Russo (1973–2026), Italian footballer
- Orazio Samacchini (1532–1577), Italian painter
- Orazio di Santis (fl. 1568–1577), Italian engraver
- Orazio Schena (1941–2024), Italian footballer
- Orazio Schillaci (born 1966), Italian politician
- Orazio Schipano (died 1596), Roman Catholic priest
- Orazio Silvestri (1835–1890), Italian geologist and volcanologist
- Orazio Solimena (1690–1789), Italian painter
- Orazio Sorbello (born 1959), Italian footballer and manager
- Orazio Spínola (1547–1616), Italian Catholic cardinal
- Orazio Svelto (1936–2026), Italian physicist, academic and author
- Orazio Talami (1624–1708), Italian painter
- Orazio Tedone (1870–1922), Italian mathematician and physicist
- Orazio Torriani (fl. 1602–1657), Italian architect
- Orazio Torsellino (1545–1599), Italian historian and author
- Orazio Toscanella (1510–1580), Italian classical philologist and translator
- Orazio Vecchi (died 1605), Italian composer
- Orazio Vecellio (c. 1528–1576), Italian painter

== See also ==
- D'Orazio, a surname derived from the name
- Horace (disambiguation)
- Horatio (disambiguation)
- Horatius (disambiguation)
