= Orazi =

Orazi is an Italian surname. Notable people with the surname include:

- Angelo Orazi (born 1951), Italian footballer and manager
- Manuel Orazi (1860–1934), Italian artist
- Orazio Orazi (1848–1912), Italian priest and painter

== See also ==
- Orazio
