= Horatio =

Horatio (/həˈreɪʃiːoʊ/) is an English male given name, an Italianized form of the ancient Roman Latin nomen (name) Horatius, from the Roman gens (clan) Horatia. The modern Italian form is Orazio, the modern Spanish form Horacio. It appears to have been first used in England in 1565, in the Tudor era during which the Italian Renaissance movement had started to influence the English culture. The name Horace is another related name from the same Latin source.

== History ==
Prominent English-language examples of the name "Horatio" include: Horatio de Vere, 1st Baron Vere of Tilbury (1565–1635), an English military leader, was one of the earliest English holders of the name, born 34 years before Shakespeare invented the character Horatio in his 1599/1601 play Hamlet. He was a grandfather of Horatio Townshend, 1st Viscount Townshend (1630–1687), whose son Charles Townshend, 2nd Viscount Townshend (a ward of Col. Robert Walpole (1650–1700) of Houghton Hall in Norfolk) married Dorothy Walpole, one of the latter's daughters and a sister of Horatio Walpole, 1st Baron Walpole (1678–1757) (and of Robert Walpole, 1st Earl of Orford (1676–1745), the Prime Minister). The name Horatio was subsequently much used by the Walpole family and by the 1st Baron Walpole's illustrious younger cousin Admiral Horatio Nelson, 1st Viscount Nelson (1758–1805), his father's great-great grandson, born one year after 1st Baron Walpole's death. The 1st Baron Walpole's son, Horatio Walpole, 1st Earl of Orford, 2nd Baron Walpole (1723–1809) served as a godfather at the christening of Admiral Horatio Nelson in 1758, who for that reason, as was common, was given his name. The Admiral died without issue, but his great-nephew Horatio Nelson, 3rd Earl Nelson (1823–1913) (born with the surname "Bolton", eventual heir and great-nephew of the Admiral's elder brother William Nelson, 1st Earl Nelson, heir of the Admiral) carried on the name.

== People ==
- Horatio Alger Jr. (1832–1899), American author
- Horatio Allen (1802–1889), American civil engineer and inventor
- Horatio Saint George Anson (1903–1925), British electrical engineer
- Horatio Thomas Austin (1801–1865), British Royal Navy officer and arctic explorer
- Horatio Barber (1875–1964), British aviation pioneer
- Horatio Beck (1810–1872), American politician
- Horatio L. Birdsall (1833–1891), American Civil War soldier awarded the Medal of Honor
- Horatio Bottomley (1860–1932), English swindler, publisher and politician
- Horatio Bridge (1806–1893), American naval commodore
- Horatio Brown (1854–1926), Scottish historian
- Horatio Caro (1862–1920), English chess player
- Horatio Chriesman (1797–1878) American surveyor, mayor in Mexican Texas and participant in the Texas Revolution
- Horatio Clare (born 1973), British author
- Horatio Davies (1842–1912), London businessman, politician and magistrate
- Horatio Dresser (1866–1945), New Thought religious leader and author
- Horatio Earle (1855–1935), American road advocate
- Horatio Fields (born 2002), American football player
- Horatio Gates (c. 1727–1806), American Revolutionary War general
- Horatio Greenough (1805–1852), American sculptor
- Horatio Hale (1817–1896), American-Canadian ethnologist, philologist and businessman
- Horatio Hathaway (1831–1898), American industrialist, politician and philanthropist
- Horatio Hocken (1857–1937), Canadian politician, social reformer and a founder of what became the Toronto Star newspaper
- Horatio J. Homer (1848–1923), Boston's first African-American police officer
- Horatio Nelson Jackson (1872–1955), American automobile pioneer and physician
- Horatio Jones (pioneer) (1763–1836), American soldier and pioneer in Western New York
- Horatio M. Jones (1826–1906), Justice of the Territorial Supreme Court of Nevada
- Buck Jones (American football) (1888–1985), NFL football player in 1922
- Horatio King (1811–1897), American politician, Postmaster General of the United States
- Horatio Herbert Kitchener, 1st Earl Kitchener (1850–1916), British field marshal
- Horatio Luro (1901–1991), American thoroughbred horse racing trainer
- Horatio Mann (1744–1814), English politician
- Horatio McCulloch (1806–1867), Scottish landscape painter
- Horatio Needham (1796–1863), American politician and lawyer
- Horatio Nelson, 1st Viscount Nelson (1758–1805), British admiral
- Horatio Palavicino (c. 1540–1600), Italian-born financier and political agent in England
- Horatio Parker (1863–1919), American composer
- Horatio Frederick Phillips (1845–1924), early aviation pioneer from the United Kingdom
- Horatio Potter (1802–1887), Episcopal bishop in the Diocese of New York
- Horatio Powell (1806–1869), English jockey
- Horatio Gordon Robley (1840–1930), British major general
- Horatio Ross (1801–1886), Scottish sportsman and pioneering amateur photographer
- Horatio Sanz (born 1974), Chilean-born American comedian
- Horatio Seymour (Vermont politician) (1778–1857), United States senator from Vermont
- Horatio Seymour (1810–1886), American politician, 18th governor of New York
- Horatio Sharpe (1718–1790), 22nd proprietary governor of Maryland
- Horatio D. Sheppard (c. 1809–1879), American physician who founded the first penny press newspaper in the United States
- Horatio Spafford (1828–1888), lawyer, hymn writer
- Horatio Gates Spafford Sr. (1778–1832), writer and inventor, father of Horatio Spafford
- Horatio Torromé (1861–1920), British/Argentinian figure skater
- Horatio Townshend (c. 1683–1751), English banker and politician
- Horatio Townshend, 1st Viscount Townshend (1630–1687), English politician
- Horatio P. Van Cleve (1809–1891), Union Army general during the American Civil War
- Horace Vere, 1st Baron Vere of Tilbury (1565–1635) (also Horatio de Vere), English military leader, grandfather of Horatio Townshend, 1st Viscount Townshend
- Horatio Walker (1858–1938), Canadian painter
- Horatio Walpole, 1st Baron Walpole (1678–1757), English diplomat
- Horatio Walpole, 1st Earl of Orford (1723–1809), British politician, son of the 1st baron Walpole
- Horatio Walpole, 2nd Earl of Orford (1752–1822), English politician, son of the 1st earl
- Horatio Walpole, 3rd Earl of Orford (1783–1858), British politician, son of the 2nd earl
- Horatio Walpole, 4th Earl of Orford (1717–1797), commonly known as Horace Walpole, English author, art historian, antiquarian and politician
- Horatio Walpole, 4th Earl of Orford (third creation) (1813–1894), British politician, son of the 3rd earl
- Horatio Wills (1811–1861), Australian pastoralist and politician
- Horatio Wright (1820–1899), American engineer and American Civil War Union Army general
- Horatio Nelson Young (1845–1913), American Civil War sailor awarded the Medal of Honor

== Fictional characters ==
- Horatio (Hamlet), in the play Hamlet by William Shakespeare
- Horatio Caine, a police lieutenant in the television series CSI: Miami
- Horatio Hellpop, in the comic book series Nexus
- Horatio Hornblower, naval hero in a series of C. S. Forester novels
- Horatio McCallister, in the animated sitcom The Simpsons
- Horatio the Elephant, a Sesame Street muppet
- Horatio 2.0, a robotic tarsier in the TV series The Nutshack

== See also ==
- Horatius (disambiguation)
- Horace (given name)
- Horacio
