= Oswaldo Castro =

Ecuadorian journalist and statistician (1902–1992)

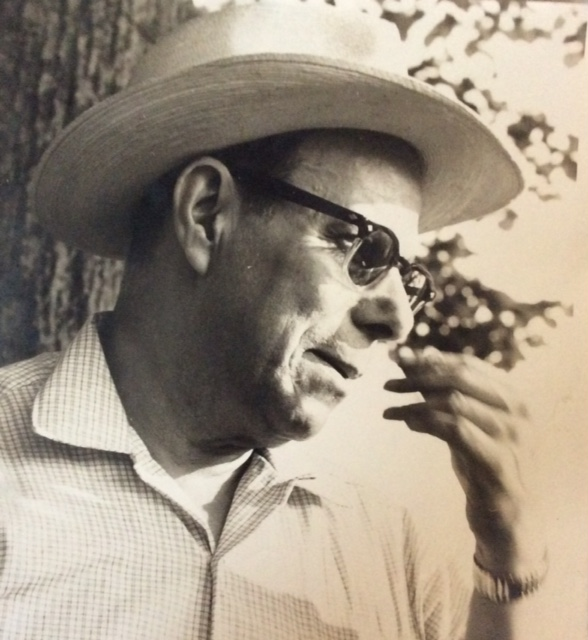
- Born: July 29, 1902; Chone, Ecuador
- Died: June 26, 1992 (aged 89); Bethesda, Maryland, USA
- Resting place: Portoviejo, Ecuador
- Occupations: poet, journalist, statistician, translator, novelist
- Writing career
- Pen name: Oscar Waldoosty
- Language: Spanish, English, Italian

Oswaldo José de los Ángeles Castro Intriago (29 July 1902 – 26 June 1992) was an Ecuadorian journalist, teacher, poet, statistician, translator/reviser, and novelist. He was instrumental in founding Chone's first newspaper, the cultural weekly El Iris; in organizing the first census of the city of Quito, Ecuador as president of its technical commission; and in promoting the United Nations' Food and Agriculture Organization as its liaison officer for Southern Latin America. While in retirement in Madrid, Spain, he published La Mula Ciega (1970), a loosely autobiographical novel about two teenagers coming of age in the early 1900s with Chone, Bahía de Caráquez, Quito, Guayaquil, and the Galápagos as backdrops.

== Youth and journalism ==
Castro was the son of Carlos María Castro Araus (1873–1945) from Portoviejo, Ecuador; and Olimpia Edeltrudis Intriago Minaya (1881–1963) from Riochico, Ecuador. Both of his parents died in Bahìa de Caráquez, Ecuador. He was born in Chone, Manabí, Ecuador on July 29, 1902.

From 1907 to 1914 Castro attended El Vergel, a private school founded and directed by Raymundo Aveiga Moreira (1876–1959), in Chone, Ecuador. At fourteen, under the tutelage and guidance of his teacher and with several of his schoolmates, most notably Enrique Amadeo Bolaños Moreira (1898–1929), he edited and wrote articles for Chone's first cultural weekly, El Iris. The only newspaper available in Chone at the time was El Horizonte, a weekly published in Portoviejo, the capital of Manabí province. El Iris was launched on April 23, 1916, its few copies painstakingly handwritten for lack of a printing press. Good penmanship was a highly desirable and respected skill at the time and was part of El Vergel's eight-year curriculum along with the more traditional subjects. El Iris' readership consisted of a few families arbitrarily selected by the young publishers. There arose an aura of suspense every week among these families to see if they would be the ones to receive the prized manuscript. Many years later during a visit by cultural historiographer, Horacio Hidrovo Peñaherrera, Columba Coppiano Delgado was able to produce a pristine copy of El Iris destined specifically to her by the young journalists. Items of interest were gathered from the private library of Guadalupe Martínez de Santos, a wealthy Mexican actress and neighbor; from illustrated magazines arriving from Europe which the boys were allowed to read at the post office before their patrons picked them up; and from news-about-town submitted by collaborating young itinerant reporters. Examples of these diverse topics were: the tercentenary of Miguel de Cervantes (most probably written by Bolaños); La Galerna, an account of the gales besetting the Cantabrian Sea (written by Castro), social, literary, humor, and daily life columns, as well as updates on World War I. The students took sides: some for the Triple Alliance, some for the Triple Entente; that is to say, Germanophiles versus Francophiles. After perhaps seven issues and the acquisition of a printing press generously donated by Colonel Juan Crecencio Álvarez Loor, El Iris was taken over by the Centro Social Juventud Chonense. By 1921, it was a well-established popular semanario chonense under the directorship of Ramón Verduga Cornejo. Due to the exodus of many of its writers, El Iris folded in 1935.

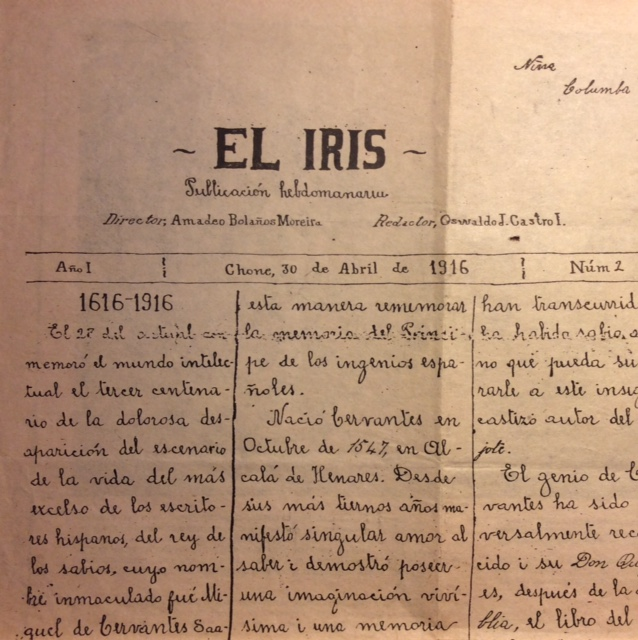
Chone's first weekly, El Iris, 1916–1935; a copy owned by Columba Coppiano Delgado

Castro's interest in journalism would surface again in Portoviejo when, in 1934, he joined the editorial board of the nascent Diario Manabita, today known as El Diario. Macario Gutiérrez Solórzano wrote, "He was always restless, impulsive, exuberant, and even anarchic." His journalistic output would continue with articles such as La Mística de Pasternak, written for the newspaper's twentieth anniversary edition. He also wrote articles under the anagrammed pseudonym Oscar Waldoosty for Guayaquil's El Universo newspaper.

Romantic poems as well as those appealing for social justice were written for the newspaper El Comercio, in Quito, as well as for Argos and Iniciación, illustrated monthly magazines dedicated mainly to poetry and socio-political critique published in the 1920s, Portoviejo's "golden age" of vibrant poetic activity. Contributions to these magazines came mainly from a group of young Manabitan poets. Castro sent his poems to Portoviejo while he was still a student in Quito. In 1972, Spain's La Tijera Literaria also published his poetry. (See "list of poems".) His technical papers were published in professional magazines and journals, most notably Trimestre Estadístico, Eslabón, in Quito; Instituto Iberoamericano de Cooperación Económica in Madrid; Moneda y Crédito also in Madrid; An article in English entitled Two men and a flower about Hernando de Soto and Simon Bolivar could not be found although the Clarion-Ledger of Jackson, Mississippi, wrote of its genesis. One of his last journalistic articles on literature, ¿Crísis de la novela en Ecuador? (published in El Universo), was written in Madrid during his retirement.

== High school, higher education, and teaching ==
From 1918 to 1924, Castro attended Colegio San Gabriel. All of its students were required to take their examinations in the secular Instituto Nacional Mejía during the years of the discrediting of private or religious institutions in favor of accredited state and secular ones espoused by General Eloy Alfaro. No sooner did he receive his diploma than he was arrested for revolutionary activities, spending three months as a political prisoner in Portoviejo's Cuartel de Infantería [army barracks]. Of that incident, fellow Manabitan novelist Othon Castillo, wrote: "Such a spectacle, I couldn't miss... I saw some heavily escorted men marching off to the army barracks... my attention was caught by a youth marching with them. 'He's just a crazy kid... just graduated from school... joined up with the revolutionaries as a telegraph operator. His name is Oswaldo Castro Intriago,' my father told me." From 1928 to 1931 he attended Escuela de Comercio Marco A. Reinoso in Guayaquil, from which he received a certificate in Accounting and Business Administration. During those years he also attended the University of Guayaquil, Faculty of Law and Social Sciences, and from 1936 to 1937, the Faculty of Economics. He received a certificate in Law and Social Sciences, and another in Economics. On August 20, 1939, the student body of the Department of Economics unanimously voted him first President of the nascent University of Guayaquil Association of the School of Economic Sciences. After a hiatus in the workforce, chiefly in teaching, banking, and accounting, he competed and won a scholarship to study in the United States out of a pool of 10,000 according to historiographer, J. Gonzalo Orellana, not an unlikely figure since U. S. veterans had been returning home to the tune of 200,000 a month after the Second World War. Post graduate work abroad included a series of courses relating to bio statistics taken in the School of Public Health, University of Michigan 1945–46; a certificate in Census Statistics from the United States Census Bureau International School, Suitland, Maryland, 1946–47, with special focus on census training and census legislation; a certificate in Economic and Agricultural Statistics from the University of Rome, Italy in conjunction with the University of Nebraska and the Food and Agricultural Organization of the United Nations, in Rome in 1956.

Excelling in every subject, he would soon become a teacher himself, first as a laboratory assistant in his school's physics lab, then as a teacher of History of Literature at Colegio Vicente Rocafuerte, of Accounting at Marco A. Reinoso School, both in Guayaquil; of Math, English, and World History at Olmedo High School, in Portoviejo. He also taught economics at Universidad Central de Quito, now the Central University of Ecuador. His next teaching experience found him in the halls of the University of Michigan, Ann Arbor, in 1946, assisting in the teaching of vital statistics. "And it just so happened" writes Castillo, "that the day he arrived at the University in Ann Arbor, Michigan, taking his entrance exam, they find that the man knows a lot about the topic and as a stimulus they make him a Teaching Assistant..." His interest and love of statistics and teaching never left him. In early 1947 he was able to procure ten scholarships for Ecuadorians interested in statistics to study abroad; and in retirement he wrote a short textbook, Análisis Estadístico Elemental ("Elementary Statistical Analysis") for non-math majors.

== Poetry ==
From a generous repertoire, some published, some not, the guiding thread in Castro's poetry were the French symbolist poets; the Russian Revolution; and an almost clinical, scientific look at his poetic material. Méndez Herrera states that Castro, in a fit of pique (not unlike the rashness of his contemporaries, the Generación decapitada poets), burned his early poems. His two unpublished collections of poems, Llamarada [Blaze] and Oro Blanco [White Gold], as well as a short story Una de tantas [One of Many] were probably lost at this time. He was able to recover some of his poetry only years later when a friend from his hometown, "knowing of that death sentence decreed by the author, had learned by heart the pyromaniac poet's verses" and recited them back to him, and they now struck that "ingrate poet with unexpected sweetness." The transition from French poetic symbolism to revolutionary social concern is clearly outlined in the poem Ayer y Hoy [Yesterday and Today] written in 1935 (see below). The year 1932 found him a member of the Guayaquil faction of the ABE (Ala Bolchevique Ecuatoriana), and the following year attending the First Congress of the Ecuadorian Communist Party Central Committee also in Guayaquil, a political adhesion that may have cost him an expulsion, albeit a temporary one, and perhaps even a job.

LA SONRISA DE TUS MANOS

La sonrisa de tus manos de Princesa decadente,
la sonrisa de tus manos de gentil Samaritana
ha besado mis cabellos, las arrugas de mi frente
y mis dos ojos ingenuos que se ríen del Nirvana.

Y en mis dos ojos ingenuos que se ríen del Nirvana
como en un cristal he visto la eclosión de tu candente,
de tu lúbrica mirada cual la de una cruel gitana
o la de Ila que amó a Buda allá en el lejano Oriente.

Y en tus ojos dos luceros de misterios de erotismo,
cual los ojos de Teresa de Jesús, la loca amante
de los rezos solitarios, miré impresa la brillante

y la suave castidad de tu carne de histerismo,
y tu carne de histerismo, con estertores paganos,
me brindó como un presente la sonrisa de tus manos.

[The smile of your hands], Quito, 1923.

While in retirement he revisited the poetry of his youth, such as the poem, "La sonrisa de tus manos" [The smile of your hands], (see blue box) written when he was 21. Almost half a century later, he used the poem almost like a script in the narrative of his novel, and then literally grafted it seamlessly to an untitled poem the novel's young protagonist was writing to his beloved. Clearly Castro's desire to fuse disciplines (poetry and prose) also included the fusion of time. Often poems submitted for publication by the young poets of the Argos generation were set to music. That "golden" period encompassed many arts, and music was a must in many Portoviejo households. Castro was a proficient piano and guitar player as were others in his circle. Of his poems set to music, chiefly by pianist and composer Constantino Mendoza Moreira, only two Aterrizaje [Landing] and Cantando el Recuerdo [Singing the Memory] have been published.

=== List of poems ===
- Sigo rimando versos (Quito, 1922)
- Va llegando el hastío (Quito, 1922)
- Thinking (Quito, 1922)
- ¡Tarde! (Quito, 1922)
- Frio... (Quito, 1923)
- Mi nocturno (Quito, 1923)
- Figulina de humo (Quito, 1923)
- La sonrisa de tus manos (Quito, 1923)
- Miss Chone, Salve: (Chone, 1928)
- Cantando el recuerdo (Set to music as a Tango by Constantino Mendoza Moreira)
- Pibe de montaña adentro (Guayaquil, 1935)
- Ayer y hoy (Guayaquil, 1935)
- Aterrizaje (Bahìa de Caráquez, 1958 – Set to music as a Pasillo by Constantino Mendoza Moreira)
- Untitled (Madrid, 1970)
- Buenos días luna (Madrid, 1972)

== The magus of math, the Segura of statistics ==
Two factors guaranteed Castro's success in making the leap from South to North America: the first was his knowledge of mathematics, the second, his persuasive communication skills and English. An anecdote written by former pupil Cicerón Robles Velásquez will show the first. "When a math teacher, who enjoyed a well-deserved reputation, came from Rocafuerte High School in Guayaquil to our Olmedo High School in Portoviejo, I was present at an exchange between the two: Don Oswaldo and him. The Guayaquileian showed off a brilliant knowledge of his subject, and when he revealed the solution to a complicated theorem, Don Oswaldo took a piece of chalk and with two numerical strokes produced the same solution taking a different route from that of the great Rocafuerte School teacher. I remember the spontaneous pat on the back (abrazo) the Guayaquileian gave the Manabitan as a reward for his mathematical feat." Perhaps it was this episode that earned him the moniker "magus of math." In it one can glimpse the influence of Castro's old high-school math teacher, Tomás Rouseau. This insightful man took special interest in students who showed a true love of learning, teaching them material which was above and beyond the curriculum, and surely Castro was among them. It was this dexterity in math and statistics that opened doors for him in his non-teaching career, first in banking and then as Director of Statistics and Census in the Ministry of Economics in Quito in 1944. During this tenure, Castro was sent abroad to acquire knowledge of census techniques. Ecuador had had no previous census experience and was scheduled to participate in the census of the Western Hemisphere planned for 1950. Equipped, then, with a solid knowledge of these fields, it was not long before he was picked not only to teach statistics, as mentioned above, but to lead the University of Michigan's School of Public Health student delegation touring Toledo, Ohio in their field research, and to observe the Herman Hollerith tabulating machines at IBM in Endicott, New York, among other census/statistics related excursions. He quickly garnered the title, the Segura of Statistics. Yet all this would have been impossible without fluent English, no easy feat for a forty-three-year-old with only a theoretical knowledge of the language. After all, he had taught English at Olmedo High School in Portoviejo. The following excerpt from a Mississippi newspaper article shows how Castro was able to pull out of this morass: "Instead of nightschool... Castro went to the movies, every day. He saw musical comedies, gangster pictures, and westerns: he saw the same picture over and over until he could recite whole scenes like a parrot. Now, after ten months in the country, he speaks glibly of things being "swell" or "on the beam," with the faintest of south-of-the-border accent."

== The statistician ==
A surge of statistical activity arose in Washington, DC beginning in mid-1946, peaking in 1947, and rippling beyond; and Castro was in the thick of it. The meetings, roundtables, and conferences that convened began dealing with the confluence of statistical methods, not only as applied to population and housing, but now also to incorporate the production of food and other land resources in order to reap the most from the forthcoming 1950 Census of the Americas. All this in view of rebuilding and ameliorating the sorry state of post-war economies. The idea was to put into practice Nobel Peace Prize recipient (and first Director General of FAO), John Boyd Orr's vision for alleviating world hunger through cooperation and harmony rather than dominance and conflict. Slowly but steadily, massive postwar geopolitical plates were moving. On March 15, 1946 Castro completed his studies at the University of Michigan. In a letter dated March 7, 1946 with letterhead: "University of Michigan, School of Public Health, Ann Arbor, Michigan, Office of the Dean", giving an early release of his grades. Henry F. Vaughan, Dean of Public Health adds "... You did good work with us, especially in your own field of bio statistics. Let me tell you how much pleasure it gave us to have you at the School of Public Health this last year." and quickly left for Washington, D. C. to continue his work with his sponsoring agency, the United States Department of Commerce, Bureau of Census. They sent him south, to North Carolina. "This will introduce Mr. Oswaldo Castro... to observe some of the pre-test in Wilmington, including the training of the enumerators and editing the schedules, in the local office," stated his perfunctory letter of introduction. Wilmington, North Carolina was a "test-tube" city, the first city in the United States where a comprehensive interim census was made, and Castro was its official foreign observer. Then back to Washington to await and study the Wilmington census results. Mid September, Halbert L. Dunn, Chief of the National Office of Vital Statistics, sent him back to the south, this time to observe the registration and tabulation of census data in Jackson, Mississippi, where he remained for over a month. In late October 1946 Castro was among the international demographers from fifteen countries in New York City invited by the Population Association of America. He attended the Association's meeting on October 25 and 26, 1946. On October 29 and 30, he participated in the "Post-war Problems of Migration" roundtable at the annual conference of the Milbank Memorial Fund. Back again in Washington, he attended a conference on census procedures given by the Bureau of Census, Department of Commerce on November 1, and on November 2 a roundtable on world population and nutrition given by the United Nations Food and Agriculture Organization. He filled the double role of delegate representing Ecuador as Director of Statistics and Census, and trainee of the United States Department of Commerce, Census Bureau. Perhaps it was here that the crucial link between his knowledge of statistics and of agricultural needs through his banking experience back home solidified. The standards for population statistics were being developed "under the auspices of the Inter-American Statistical Institute; those for agriculture under the Food and Agriculture Organization (FAO)." The doors of FAO began to open and soon he would be tapped to be their Liaison Officer for the southern part of Latin America, a post he would easily fill thanks to his communication and integrating skills. It was precisely these skills that enabled him to put to use the census practices he had observed in North Carolina and Mississippi and to bring together census experts he had met up north to work closely with their Ecuadorian counterparts. Hence, the road to the first census of Ecuador's capital, Quito, became quite smooth.

== Quito census ==
On Thursday, June 26, 1947, Castro in front of a large gathering in the sports field of Quito's Instituto Nacional Mejia, uttered these words, "Enumerators, Patrol Leaders, Segment Leaders, Ladies and Gentlemen, do you swear by God, by the Fatherland, and by your personal honor, to faithfully fulfill the duties entrusted to you?" A resounding "We do!" answered him in unison. The Census of Quito started the very next morning at precisely 6 AM; and then, at exactly 1:46 PM, the blaring of sirens, the clanging of bells, the shrill voices of multiple radio station anchors, pronounced it over. At 8:30 that evening, Castro, on behalf of the Census Junta, released the results. But how could such a monumental task have been accomplished in just under eight hours, while the one he had witnessed in Wilmington, North Carolina had taken over a week? With military precision, the Junta, under the leadership of Miguel Ángel Zambrano, had planned and foreseen every aspect of the census execution. Actuary Peter Thullen, also a Census Technical Commission member, had joined Castro in studying Quito's existing statistical data, taking full advantage of work done in the past by institutions such as Quito's Department of Health. Press and radio cooperated in every way. Participation in the census was cast in a patriotic light. As early as March census experts from the Inter-American Statistical Institute began arriving in Mariscal Sucre airport, and Castro was there to welcome them. Simultaneously teachers at the university, high school, and elementary school level were recruited and instructed in census enumerating techniques and introduced to the art of canvassing, a word new to them. They in turn recruited and trained their students, both university and high school (seniors), as enumerators; while the elementary school teachers imparted to the children the need and importance of censuses in general and of the imminent census of Quito in particular, a message that was absorbed and brought home to parents, grandparents, friends and relatives. Under the Census Propaganda directorship of Gustavo Vallejo Larrea and future novelist, Arturo Montesinos Malo (1913–2009) who had also helped in the training of enumerators, a million flyers containing general census instructions were distributed throughout the city, some in the form of tags attached to popular snacks and soft drinks, many dropped from airplanes. Upper echelons of society had been informed through Castro's well-publicized lectures given in Quito City Hall and in the Ecuadorian–North American Center. They were inspired and perhaps moved to indignation upon hearing his words, "I've been working with the Census Bureau in Washington, D. C. where they have a large map of countries that have implemented population censuses; in there are all countries of the Americas, those who have had censuses cover a white space... to Ecuador corresponds a large black blotch... for which it has been named 'the demographic jungle of the Americas'." Quito's Mayor Jacinto Jijón y Caamaño along with the Municipal Council and other dignitaries had attended these lectures. With the city thus prepared, two thousand one hundred and thirty two enumerators set forth that morning in cars, on foot, and on horseback and were welcomed with (literally) open doors and often with coffee and snacks. Interpreters were on the ready in case of non-Spanish speakers; to wit: English, German, French, Czech, Russian, and, most importantly, Quechua. Census planners had divided Quito into seven segments, each of which comprised 147 zones. An executive order had been procured from President José María Velasco Ibarra. Quito streets were deserted. Only enumerators roamed from house to house, leaving a red notice on doors to indicate that the household had been registered. When they encountered an imminent death or birth scenario, they waited patiently at the door. Nine deaths and twenty births were recorded in Quito in those eight hours. An anecdote tells of an enumerator on horseback who came across a hermit living in a cave in the highest part of the Pampa Chupa area of the city. He quickly whipped out a special census form designed for just such an encounter, and having registered the resident, finding no door on which to peg his red form, nailed it to a near-by tree. From 3 to 7 P M. results were gathered and tabulated by 50 bank adding machines and respective personnel of the Banco Central and other financial institutions: Banco del Pichincha, Banco de Préstamos, Caja de Pensiones, Oficina del Comercio; under the directorship of Carlos Procaccia, Banco Central's Director of Economic Research. There were 211,174 residents in Quito on June 27, 1947. Granted, it was just a provisional figure and a trial census, as was the one Castro had studied in Wilmington, North Carolina, but one that was most valuable for the implementation of the general census of Ecuador scheduled for 1950. As Calvert Dedrick, Coordinator of the United States Department of Commerce's International Statistics Bureau of the Census, had said a month earlier on his visit to Ecuador, "I think there is a good atmosphere in this country: one can see a lot of interest and I'm sure the census of Quito will be a valuable trial, a good test; but Ecuadorians must go further; that is, they must do a complete census of their country."

== Promoter of FAO in Latin America ==
By the end of August 1947 Castro was off again, back to the United States to prepare for the forthcoming International Congress of Statistics and Demography of the United Nations. This recently created international body had requested specifically that governments send technical personnel and not diplomats to fill these posts, a message Castro would later stress in all his visits through South America. From September 6 through 18 he participated in The First General Assembly of the Inter-American Statistical Institute along with fellow Ecuadorian delegate, Luis López Muñoz. He was President of the International Statistics Division. Shortly thereafter he became FAO's Liaison Officer for southern South America, joining colleagues, William G. Casseres, Liaison Officer for Central America and the Caribbean, and A. G. Sandoval, Liaison Officer for northern South America, in this continent-encompassing effort. Castro had received ample training for this endeavor not only from his innate communication and speaking skills he had honed in the United States, but also as a spokesperson for the Ecuadorian National Committee of the United Nations' newly formed FAO, directed by Ecuadorian U.N. expert and Human Rights advocate, Arturo Meneses Pallares, early August 1947; and as designated Statistics and Census Representative for said Committee in mid August. A whirlwind tour followed that would take him to ten countries in two and a half months. It started with a week-long collaborative meeting on November 2, 1947, at the Inter-American Institute of Agricultural Sciences in Turrialba, Costa Rica, and then a quick stint through Panama, Colombia, and Ecuador before visiting his target countries in South America: November 20 to December 2, Peru; December 2 to December 11, Bolivia; December 11 to December 23, Chile; January 4, 1948 to January 13, Argentina; January 13 to January 22, Paraguay; January 22 to January 28, Uruguay. He visited various statistical and agricultural institutions in these countries, and delivered clear and concise reasons for his mission. The message was the same, slightly tweaked to meet the circumstances of each country — the history of FAO; praise and vision of its founder; the need for a coordinated effort to address poverty and hunger, ravages of the recent war, through better growth and distribution of food and other resources; the importance of the 1950s Census of the Americas and the World Agricultural Census; the merits of joining FAO, purveyor of technical advice and of information on financial assistance; an announcement of the creation of three regional hubs to be based in Central, Pacific, and Atlantic South America; and an exhortation to attend the conference on forestry in Teresopolis, Brazil in April, and on nutrition in Montevideo, Uruguay in July. He held press conferences in venues arranged for him in advance by likeminded technical functionaries or, when these were not forthcoming, in his hotel lobby, where newspaper reporters, pad in hand, were offered "cocktails," new to their experience, along with his message. Newspapers printed his words in a favorable and newsworthy light, as can be seen in the reference section, although the three-pronged headline in Chile's Las Últimas Noticias might be a bit tongue-in-cheek with whiffs of Hollywood in the air. It begins with eye-catching "FAO, three-letter fairy god-mother, seeks a cure to poverty and hunger," is quickly amended by bigger, bolder letters, "We will help people who suffer from hunger: fishery plan," finally settling into a third sub-headline, "Chile also will cooperate with the world organization in feeding Europe." Castro's promotion of FAO was cast in the light of a crusade against hunger.

On December 19, 1947, he was received by President Gabriel González Videla, former Chilean ambassador to the United Nations. Chile eventually became FAO's regional hub for the Pacific. On February 10, he returned to Washington, reporting on his findings and giving his recommendations. He had prepared the terrain for future interaction between FAO and Latin America. The link between demographic and agricultural censuses and their importance had been made, thus facilitating these two components of 1950's hemispheric census. The two promised conferences were well attended. Perónist Argentina would not form part of the technical organizations of the United Nations at this time, although they sent observers to the Teresopolis and Montevideo conferences. As Statistical Information Officer of FAO's Publications Branch, Castro himself attended the follow-up of the 1948 Montevideo Conference on Nutrition, held in Rio, June 5–13, 1950, joining the delegation headed by nutritionist Wallace R. Aykroyd, Then early in 1951, he boarded the Saturnia and headed to Rome to a behind-the-scenes, behind-the-desk position at FAO's world headquarters.

== Translator/reviser of words and memories: the writing of a novel ==
Castro moved from visibility to anonymity with ease, for his true love had always been language. From now on his work would lack name recognition and acquire a job number. He translated and revised FAO documents, working papers, and books in the fields of diplomatic correspondence, nutrition, economics, statistics, and forestry in Rome until 1956, and in budgetary matters for the Fifth Commission for the United Nations back in New York until the end of 1962. Then returning once more to Rome he revised papers on economics and statistics for FAO's 1962–1963 budget. His last work was designated as Job D6420/S 7–54545, a 250-page Spanish translation of G. W. Chapman's "A Manual on Establishment Techniques in Man-made Forests" FAO, FO:MISC/73/3, 1973. Residing in Europe in semi-retirement, he began to write his memories of the "corner of the tropics" where he was born in the form of a narrative adumbrating magic realism a full year before the term hit mainstream, and narrowly missing the full impact of the Latin American Boom. Now, vivid in his mind, the colors, sounds, smells, tastes, songs, words, dreams, of his youth splash his narrative with vibrancy. "That multifaceted experience of a town and a people when pulsed by the harmony of inspiration, becomes a veritable score that everyone can hear... and the writer feels empty or frustrated if he has not fulfilled the tacit duty of setting it down ... in a book.... And this is how, it seems to us, La mula ciega, was born...," Spanish writer and translator, José Méndez Herrera, wrote in the prologue to the novel's first edition. He interweaved the fabric of his narration with multiple threads of sayings, proverbs, and aphorisms: seventy six, to be exact, which later Professor Francisco Soldevilla from the University of California extracted for a critical study. Influenced by the English literature of his time, specifically Henry Miller and John Cleland's then recently published Fanny Hill, he introduced a thread of erotica, not often seen in Spanish letters. He tested the waters by reading his material to friend Luis Coloma Silva, who had been Ecuador's Representative to the U. N. in the late '50s. Coloma's response, "How is your project... going? I hope you soon decide to publish, I harbor the certainty of its success, for the new focus on "real reality" is set in pure and nimble language and all this in an environment of exuberant, tropical color. Full speed ahead, then! There's no time to lose!" encouraged him to proceed. He published La Mula Ciega in November 1970 in Madrid. To his dismay, whole passages were cut; and even so, Franco's Editorial Management Office of the Ministry of Information and Tourism banned the novel, prohibiting its distribution in Spain and its territories, and any sales transaction in pesetas. A few copies reached Latin America at the author's expense. Spanish editor Alfaguara, with whom arrangements had been made before censorship was unable to distribute. The free-fall from enthusiasm to dismay is reflected in Uruguayan critic H. Alvarez M.'s words: "With this novel filled with passion, fantasy, and color, this Ecuadorian writer residing in Spain is revealed as one of the most outstanding creators of contemporary Ecuador," followed in the very next issue by: "The work presents undeniable esthetic, thematic, and stylistic values and constitutes a courageously defined and valuable account of what we deem to be daily occurrences carefully studied by the author... Perhaps because of these values, because of the crudeness of its language, because of the honesty of its approach, the book in question has just been banned in Spain, victim of another outrage, impossible to understand in this century." Perceiving his work as mutilated, he meticulously glued back the expurgated passages, in a vain attempt to make it whole again.

And yet, reviewers such as Ecuadorian R. A. Carbo Noboa and Mexican Cristina Romero while wholeheartedly agreeing with the censorship could not help but admire the "pure, poetic quality... in describing our scenery, our people, our traditions which could be Ecuadorian or Mexican;" or, in the case of Carbo Noboa, "In what is folkloric and indigenous, I must point out that it is difficult to write something more beautiful." Walter Rubin who saw similarities with Jiménez' Platero in the poetic purity of Castro's narrative deemed the erotic and rustic to have been represented with artistic mastery. Mid 1972, he entered his novel in Caracas' second Rómulo Gallegos Prize competition. A telegram stamped July 27, 1972, from the National Fine Arts and Culture Institute informed him that the jury, composed of Antonia Palacios, José Luis Cano, Domingo Miliani, Emir Rodríguez Monegal and Mario Vargas Llosa, had given the prize to Gabriel García Márquez with his novel One Hundred Years of Solitude. Castro's was among the 30 semi-finalist novels of the 165 submitted that year. "In a strict sense of historical-cultural justice, I think Gabriel García Márquez must have read and learned from Horacio Hidrovo Velásquez in Un hombre y un rio [A Man and a River]; from Oswaldo Castro Intriago in La mula ciega [The Blind Mule]; from Othon Castillo Vélez in Sed en el puerto [Thirst in the Port]; ..." Julio Hernández Luna would say many years later. With the brouhaha of the censorship dying down and retaining the lasting merit of descriptive and poetic expression immortalizing the northern coast of Ecuador at one time, the novel would see four more editions and an English translation. In 2008, recognizing the cultural value of the work, the Ecuadorian Ministry of Culture included the novel among works contributing to the propagation of national identity, allocating funds for its dissemination.

== Death and legacy ==
Castro died on June 26, 1992, in Bethesda, Maryland. He had a double funeral: one in Bethesda and one in Portoviejo where he was interred. Numerous accolades and commemorations were given to him from his native province; a school named after him, a literary prize, and even a coffee. In 2008, Chone's theater group, "Arte Popular" under the directorship of Roger Bustamante produced a hybrid theater/video work entitled, "Homage to Oswaldo Castro and his blind mule." In November 2015, his novel was revisited by the students of the Universidad Politécnica Salesiana in Cuenca. In February 2021, Chone's Grupo Ariel released a song entitled "La mula ciega," by Hermogenes Williams Rodriguez (lyrics and vocal) and Jósse Cedeño (music and arrangement) thanking Castro for his work and highlighting the novel's characters. Gutiérrez Solórzano best described Castro's life trajectory: "An admirer of Descartes, Oswaldo Castro, like the French philosopher, wanted to be both 'author and actor of everything in this life'."
