= Horatio (disambiguation) =

Horatio is a male given name.

Horatio may also refer to:

== Places in the United States ==
- Horatio, Arkansas, a city
- Horatio, Mississippi, an unincorporated community
- Horatio, Ohio, an unincorporated community
- Horatio, Pennsylvania, an unincorporated community
- Horatio, South Carolina, an unincorporated community

== Other uses ==
- Horatio (Hamlet), a character in the play Hamlet by William Shakespeare
- HMS Horatio (1807), a frigate
- HMT Horatio (T153), a Second World War naval trawler
- Horatio High School, Horatio, Arkansas
- Horatio (crater), a crater on the Moon
- Horatio, a faction in the strategy game Endless Space

== See also ==
- Horatio Stump, a hill on King George Island in the South Shetland Islands
- Horace (65–8 BC), Roman poet
- Horacio
- Horatius (disambiguation)
