= Servius Cornelius Maluginensis (consular tribune 386 BC) =

4th century BC Roman senator, general and consul

Servius Cornelius Maluginensis was a politician and general of the Roman Republic. He was elected consular tribune seven times in 386, 384, 382, 380, 376, 370, and 368 BC. Despite having one of the most successful careers of the Republic, Servius' life is little known.

== Family background ==
Servius belonged to the patrician gens Cornelia, one of the oldest and most successful gentes of the Republic; no other gens had more consulships than the Cornelii. The cognomen Maluginensis is the first recorded among the Cornelii; it was first borne by Servius Cornelius, also the first consul of the gens.

Servius was the son of Publius Cornelius Maluginensis, consular tribune in 404, and the grandson of Marcus Cornelius Maluginensis, consul in 436. He also had an elder brother, Publius Cornelius Maluginensis, the first to bear the famous cognomen of Scipio, who was consular tribune in 397, 395, and 394.

The cognomen indicates that the family originated from (or had properties in) a town name Malugino, although no place of that name has been subsequently identified.

== Career ==
=== Consular tribune (386 BC) ===
Servius was elected consular tribune for the first time in 386. His colleagues were Marcus Furius Camillus, Quintus Servilius Fidenas, Lucius Quinctius Cicinnatus, Lucius Horatius Pulvillus, and Publius Valerius Potitus Poplicola. The consular college was dominated by Camillus, who had saved Rome from the Gauls four years earlier. As a result of this, the other tribunes voluntarily gave up their independent authority, becoming de facto subordinates of Camillus. In this year the Volscians of Antium attacked the Pomptine territory, land that the Romans coveted. As a result, Camillus decided to lead a campaign against the Antiates, assigning the other five tribunes with duties to attend to while he conducted his campaign. To Servius Cornelius, he delegated control over the city and state while he was away from the city.

=== Consular tribune (384 BC) ===
Servius was elected consular tribune a second time in 384. His colleagues were Publius Valerius Potitus Poplicola, Marcus Furius Camillus, Servius Sulpicius Rufus, Gaius Papirius Crassus, and Titus Quinctius Capitolinus.

=== Consular tribune (382 BC) ===
Servius was elected consular tribune a third time in 382. His colleagues were Spurius Papirius Crassus, Lucius Papirius Mugillanus, Quintus Servilius Fidenas, Gaius Sulpicius Camerinus, and Lucius Aemilius Mamercinus.

=== Consular tribune (380 BC) ===
Servius was elected consular tribune a fourth time in 380. His colleagues were Lucius Valerius Poplicola, Publius Valerius Potitus Poplicola, Licinus Menenius Lanatus, Gaius Sulpicius Peticus, Lucius Aemilius Mamercinus, Gnaeus Sergius Fidenas Coxo, Tiberius Papirius Crassus, and Lucius Papirius Mugillanus.

=== Consular tribune (376 BC) ===
Servius was elected consular tribune a fifth time in 376. His colleagues were Lucius Papirius Mugillanus, Licinus Menenius Lanatus, and Servius Sulpicius Praetextatus.

=== Consular tribune (370 BC) ===
Servius was elected consular tribune a sixth time in 370. His colleagues were Lucius Furius Medullinus, Aulus Manlius Capitolinus, Servius Sulpicius Praetextatus, Publius Valerius Potitus Poplicola, Gaius Valerius Potitus.

=== Consular tribune (368 BC) ===
Servius was elected consular tribune a seventh time in 368. His colleagues were Titus Quinctius Cincinnatus Capitolinus, Servius Sulpicius Praetextatus, Spurius Servilius Structus, Lucius Papirius Crassus, and Lucius Veturius Crassus Cicurinus.

== Bibliography ==
=== Ancient works ===
- Livy, Ab Urbe Condita (English translation by Rev. Canon Roberts on Wikisource).

=== Modern works ===
- T. Robert S. Broughton, The Magistrates of the Roman Republic, American Philological Association, 1951–1952.
- Attilio Degrassi, Fasti Capitolini recensuit, praefatus est, indicibus instruxit Atilius Degrassi, Turin, 1954.
- Henri Etcheto, Les Scipions. Famille et pouvoir à Rome à l’époque républicaine, Bordeaux, Ausonius Éditions, 2012
- Friedrich Münzer, Roman Aristocratic Parties and Families, translated by Thérèse Ridley, Johns Hopkins University Press, 1999 (originally published in 1920).
- Stephen Oakley, A Commentary on Livy, Books VI-X Volume I: Introduction and Book VI, Oxford, Clarendon Press, 1999.
- Robert Maxwell Ogilvie, Commentary on Livy, books 1–5, Oxford, Clarendon Press, 1965.
- August Pauly, Georg Wissowa, Friedrich Münzer, et alii, Realencyclopädie der Classischen Altertumswissenschaft (abbreviated PW), J. B. Metzler, Stuttgart, 1894–1980.
