= Giaccio =

Giaccio is an Italian surname. Notable people with the surname include:

- Olivia Giaccio (born 2000), American freestyle skier
- Orazio Giaccio (fl. 1610s), Italian composer
- William G. Giaccio (1924–2000), American politician
