= D'Orazio =

D'Orazio is an Italian surname. The surname is derived from the name Orazio, which comes from the Latin name Horatius (equivalent to Horace in English). A variant of the surname is Dorazio.

Notable people with the surname include:

- John D'Orazio (1955–2011), Australian politician
- Matt D'Orazio (born 1976), American football player
- Sante D'Orazio (born 1956), American photographer
- Valerie D'Orazio (born 1974), American comic book writer

== Dorazio ==
- Dan Dorazio (1952–2024), American football coach
- Mark Dorazio, American politician
- Piero Dorazio (1927–2005), Italian painter

== See also ==
- Orazio
