= Santa Maria in Via, Camerino =

Church building in Camerino, Italy

Coordinates: 43.131875°N 13.063920°E

Santa Maria in Via is a Baroque style Roman Catholic church and Marian Shrine in Camerino, in the province of Macerata, region of Marche, Italy.

== History ==
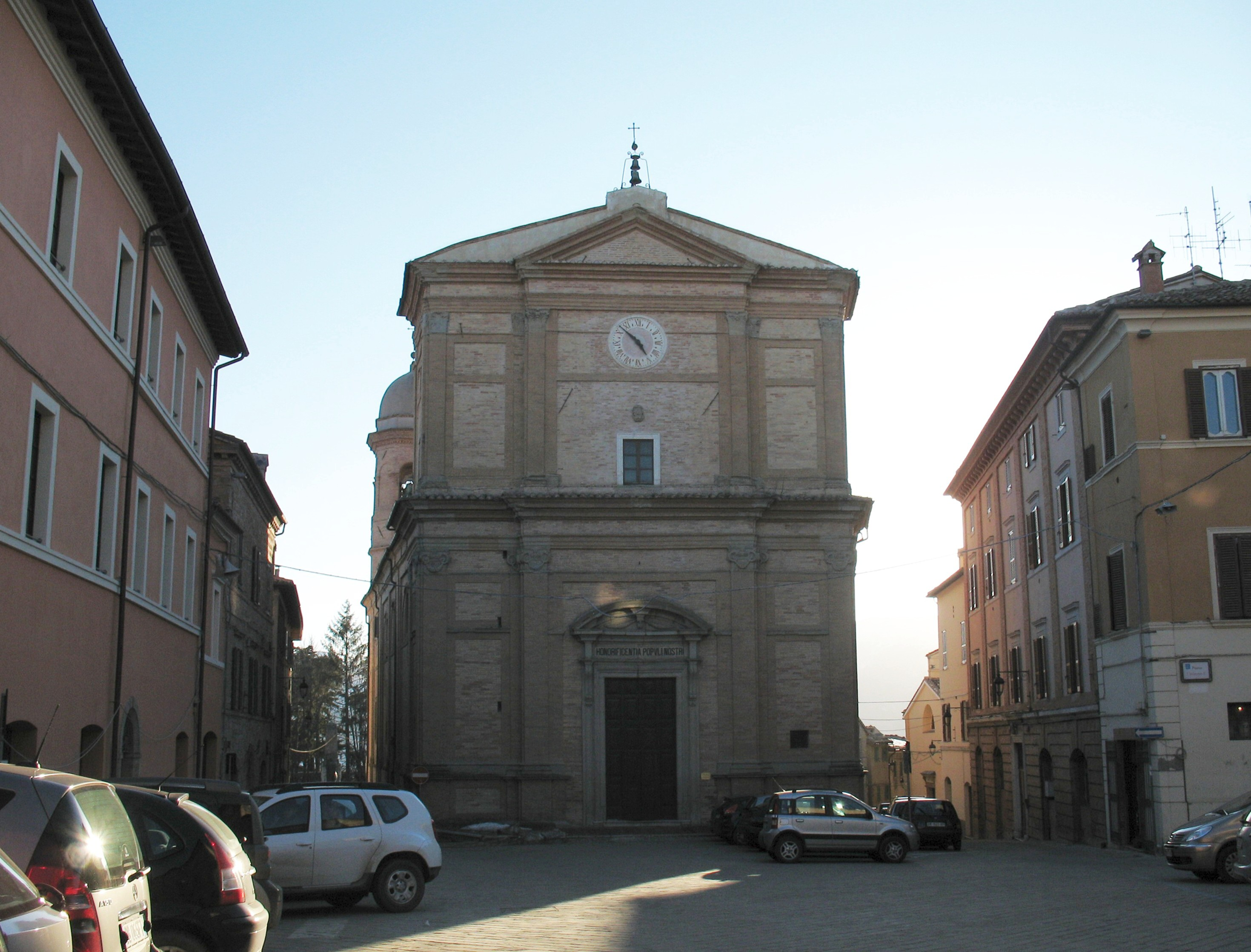
Facade of Santa Maria in Via

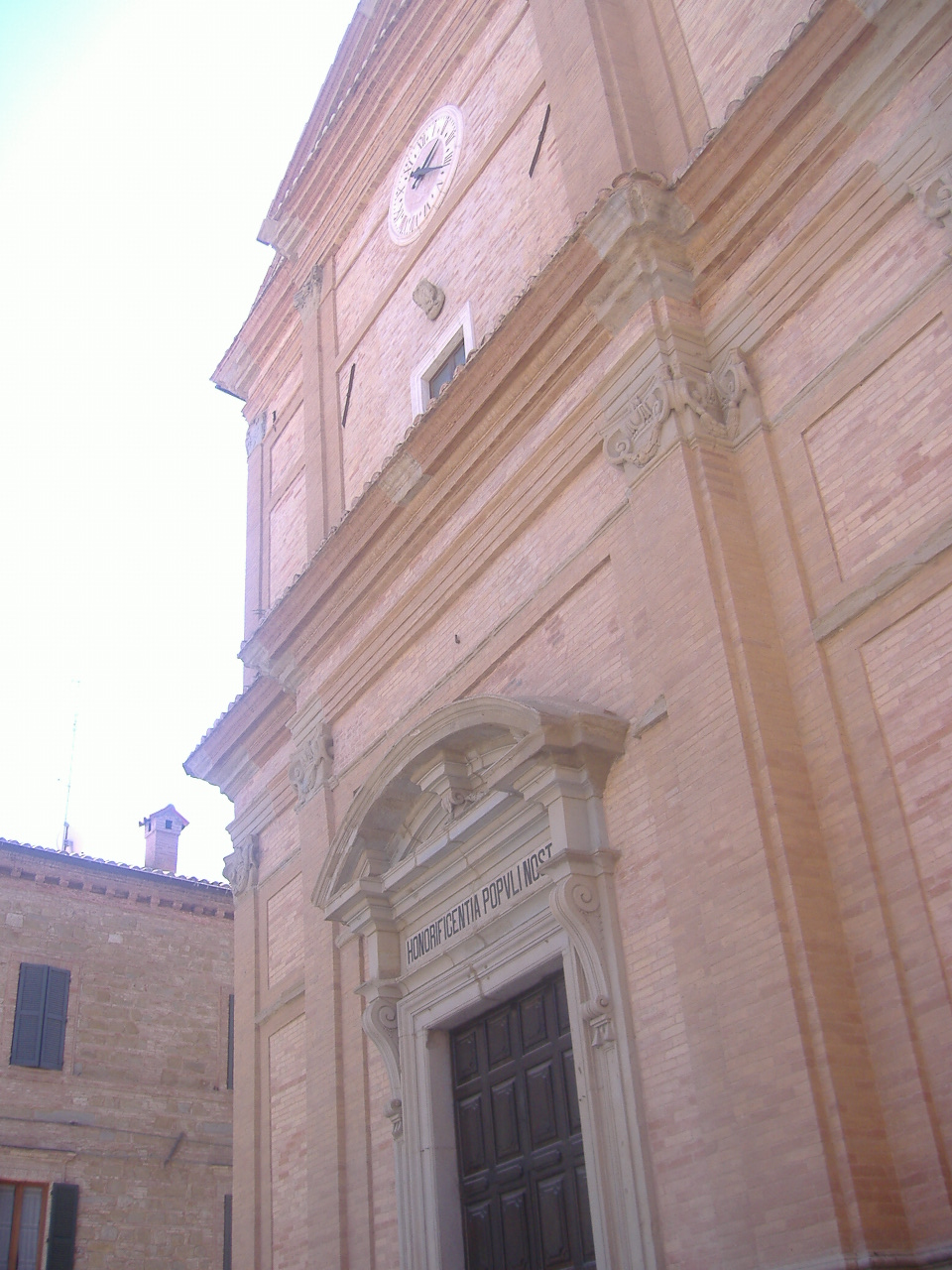
Facade of Santa Maria in Via

The church was designed at the site of former small oratory, acquired by the Cardinal Angelo Giori between 1639 and 1642. In 1643, the Cardinal acquired a venerated 13th-century image of the Madonna and Child attributed to the Master of Camerino. The Cardinal commissioned Andrea Sacchi to design the church, consecrated in 1654.

The layout is elliptical with four lateral semicircular chapels. The chapel of the crucifix and a baptistery occupy the anterior chapels, while towards the apses is the oratory of the confraternity and the sacristy, opening to the aedicule with the icons of the Virgin. The icon was restored in 1973. The icon has writing in gothic letters stating “Virgo parit Christum velut angelus intimat ipsum”.

The original brick ceiling collapsed during an earthquake in 1799, and was replaced by trussed roof. The interior is decorated with faux polychrome marble (scagliola)and completed only in 1896 by dall'Adami of Rome and the Ferranti of Tolentino. The church was damaged again by the 1997 earthquake and reopened for worship in September 2006.

The nave ceiling was frescoed by Giuseppe Rinaldi, known as lo Spazza, and depicts the Life and Mysteries of Mary. The presbytery was painted by Orazio Orazi, depicting the icon of the Madonna and Child of the Master of Camerino putatively arriving from Smyrna (Izmir) and its coronation.

In the chapel to the right, was once the tomb of Cardinal Giori, it now houses the crucifix with which in 1750, St Paolo della Croce, founder of the Passionists, blessed the people of Camerino, while promulgating his eremitic monastic mission. The paper mache crucifix was derived from a Chapel in the Strada di Beldiletto.

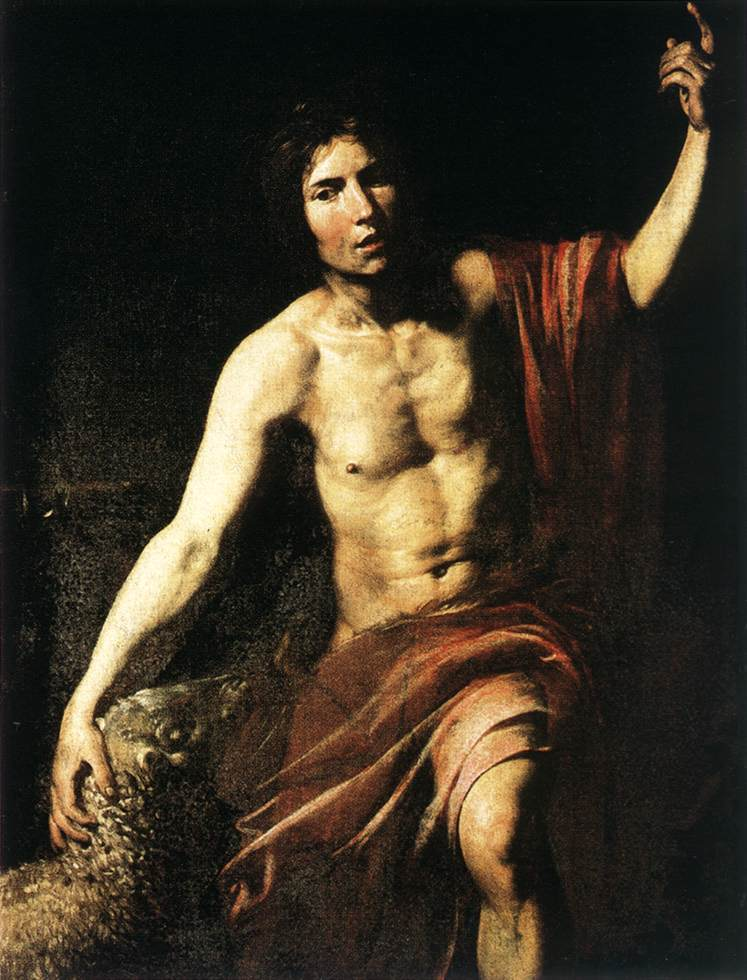
St John the Baptist by Valentin de Boulogne

Cardinal Giori originally aimed to endow each of the four chapels with three master paintings. Ultimately, many of the paintings are copies of Baroque masterworks. In the first chapel on right, the paintings depict Saints Francis of Sales and Paola by Andrea Sacchi. The Second chapel has a copy of the altarpiece of St Michael Archangel by Guido Reni. In the chapel near the entrance, is a Flagellation of Christ by a painter influenced by Caravaggio. The sacristy has two canvases by Valentin de Boulogne, depicting St John the Baptist and St Jerome, restored in 1973. In the oratory, are depiction of seven apostles, by a follower of Sacchi, and a St Andrew, copy of a work by Simon Vouet.
