= Lucius Horatius Pulvillus =

4th-century BC Roman consular tribune and general

Lucius Horatius Pulvillus (Note: Hereafter called Pulvillus.) was a politician and general of the Roman Republic. He was elected consular tribune in 386 BC and fought the Volscians.

== Family background ==
Lucius belonged to the patrician gens Horatia, which was of the greatest antiquity. The name first appears in the Roman literary tradition during the reign of Tullus Hostilius—the legendary third King of Rome—at the occasion of the combat between the Horatii and the Curiatii. In historical times, Marcus Horatius Pulvillus was consul during the first year of the Roman Republic, in 509, and a second time in 507. His nephew Horatius Cocles played the leading role in the legendary Battle of the Sublician Bridge in 508, and his son Gaius was twice consul in 477 and 457. After this prominent debut, the Horatii Pulvilli disappear from the sources until Pulvillus. Two other Horatii were however recorded: Marcus Horatius Barbatus, consul in 449, and his son Lucius Horatius Barbatus, consular tribune in 425.

Pulvillus' father is not known because the Fasti Capitolini are missing for the years between 389 and 381.

== Career ==
Pulvillus was elected tribunus militum consulari potestate ("military tribune with consular power") in 386 in a college of six members. His colleagues were Marcus Furius Camillus, Servius Cornelius Maluginensis, Quintus Servilius Fidenas, Lucius Quinctius Cicinnatus, and Publius Valerius Potitus Poplicola. The college was dominated by the figure of Camillus, the saviour of Rome against the Gauls who had just sacked the city the year before, and to whom the other tribunes willingly abdicated their independent authority, making him dictator in all but name. This year there was a war waged against the Volscians of Antium with Camillus leading the attack and Valerius serving as his second in command. As for the other tribunes, Camillus personally assigned their duties, Pulvillus being assigned to take control of the supply lines for the war. In the war, Camillus achieved victory against the Volscians and laid siege to Antium, however the senate then recalled Camillus and Valerius in order to lead another war against the Etruscans, who had just attacked two allied cities of Rome. Camillus and Valerius therefore abandoned their army outside of Antium, going to Rome to take command of another army previously led by the tribune Lucius Quinctius in order to conduct the campaign against the Etruscans. After this, command over the army besieging Antium was transferred to Quinctius and Pulvillus.

== Bibliography ==
=== Ancient sources ===
- Dionysius of Halicarnassus, Romaike Archaiologia (English translation on LacusCurtius).
- Livy, Ab Urbe Condita (English translation by Rev. Canon Roberts on Wikisource).

=== Modern sources ===
- T. Robert S. Broughton, The Magistrates of the Roman Republic, American Philological Association, 1951–1952.
- Tim J. Cornell, The Origins of Rome, Italy and Rome from the Bronze Age to the Punic Wars (c. 1000–264 BC), London & New York, Routledge, 1995.
- Attilio Degrassi, Fasti Capitolini recensuit, praefatus est, indicibus instruxit Atilius Degrassi, Turin, 1954.
- Denis Feeney, Caesar's Calendar, Ancient Time and the Beginnings of History, Berkeley/Los Angeles/London, California University Press, 2007.
- Stephen Oakley, A Commentary on Livy, Books VI-X Volume I: Introduction and Book VI, Oxford, Clarendon Press, 1999.
- August Pauly, Georg Wissowa, Friedrich Münzer, et alii, Realencyclopädie der Classischen Altertumswissenschaft (abbreviated PW), J. B. Metzler, Stuttgart, 1894–1980.
- Francisco Pina Polo, The Consul at Rome: The Civil Functions of the Consuls in the Roman Republic, Cambridge University Press, 2011.
