= Horatius Paulijn =

Dutch painter

Horatius Paulijn (1644, Amsterdam – 1691, Amsterdam), was a Dutch Golden Age painter.

== Biography ==
According to Houbraken who was told his fortunes by the painter Johannes Voorhout, Paulijn was a god-fearing man who planned a trip to the Holy Land with Jan Rote and travelled with him to London and Hamburg in search of travel companions, but came back to Amsterdam after their flags and other equipment were stolen. Voorhout had met him in Hamburg along with a seascape painter by the name of Bellevois and the landscape painter Matthias Scheits.

According to the RKD he is registered as a painter of portraits and genre scenes and travelled to England, Denmark, and in 1675, Hamburg. A work from Amsterdam is dated 1682.
