= Horacio Mancilla =

Horacio Mancilla is a Mexican voice-over, dubbing actor and writer who started his career in 1991 as Radio Capital Dj in Mexico City. In 1995 he became advertising copywriter and at the same time he developed a career as a voice-over actor. Horacio Mancilla gained notoriousness in the Mexican advertising industry for his more natural and conversational approach to voice over performing, which for decades, had been dominated by deep, announcer-type voices. He also became popular for his voice impersonations of Mexican politicians, sportsmen and artists on radio spots and news programs. He was the lead voice on "Tepocatas Radio", a political parody section on Imagen 90.5 radio show Politica Ficción. Mancilla was also a regular collaborator on W radio 96.9 show "El Weso". In 2007 he launched Canibal Radio, a comedy podcast that later became part of the popular website Dixo. As a writer, Horacio Mancilla is the author of the book "Slim Viaja en segunda" (Slim travels second class), a fiction story inspired on Mexican tycoon and the world's richest man, Carlos Slim. Horacio Mancilla is currently the Mexican Spanish voice of Dino, the animated character on Danonino's TV commercials. He is also the Spanish voice of American Express, Land Rover, Snickers Cadenatres TV and Cinepolis. As dubbing actor, he is the Spanish voice of Todd, the character from the popular TV show "Samantha Who?"
