= Horacio Martínez =

Horacio Martínez may refer to:

- Horacio Martínez (baseball) (born 1915), Dominican shortstop and second baseman
- Horacio Martínez (footballer) (born 1987), Argentine forward
- Horacio Martínez Meza (born 1972), Mexican politician
