= Horatius =

Horatius may refer to:

== People ==
=== Roman era ===
- several ancient Roman men of the gens Horatia, including:
  - Quintus Horatius Flaccus, the poet known in English as Horace
  - one of the Horatii, three members of the gens Horatia who fought to the death against the Curiatii
  - Marcus Horatius Pulvillus, consul in 509 and 507 BC
  - Horatius Cocles, hero who defended the Sublician Bridge
  - Marcus Horatius Barbatus, consul in 449 BC

=== Post-Roman era ===
- Horatius Acquaviva d'Aragona (d.1617), an Italian prelate
- Horatius Paulijn (1644-1691), a Dutch painter
- Horatius Sebastiani (1771-1851), a French soldier and diplomat
- Horatius Bonar (1808–1889), a Scottish churchman and poet
- Horatius "H.H." Coleman (1892-1969), an American church pastor
- Horatius Murray (1903-1989), a British Army General

=== Fictional characters ===
- Horatius Faversham, a character in the radio series The Penny Dreadfuls Present...

== Literature ==
- a poem in the Lays of Ancient Rome by Thomas Babington Macaulay; for the full text of the poem see Horatius)

== Other uses ==
- The Horatius Stakes, an American thoroughbred horse race
- G-AAXD Horatius, a named Handley Page H.P.42 airliner

== See also ==
- Horatio (disambiguation)
- Horace (disambiguation)
