= Horacio Badaraco =

Argentinian anarchist and journalist

Horacio Badaraco (1901–1946) was an Argentine anarchist and journalist, born in Buenos Aires.

Badaraco and Rodolfo González Pacheco established the anarchist newspaper La Antorcha. Badaraco believed that the demographic diversity of Argentina had positively impacted the country's knowledge base and creativity. He supported the country's indigenous peoples and their struggles against colonialism. Throughout the 1920s, Badaraco's antorchista tendency developed ties with other anti-colonialist movements, including the Sandinistas in Nicaragua, the Zapatistas in Mexico and the communists in Cuba. In Argentine itself, Badaraco opposed the nascent Communist Party of Argentina, which he criticised as authoritarian.

== Bibliography ==
- Bayer, Osvaldo (2015) [1975]. The Anarchist Expropriators: Buenaventura Durruti and Argentina's Working-Class Robin Hoods. Oakland, California: AK Press. ISBN 978-1-84935-223-9. OCLC 908088288.
- de Laforcade, Geoffroy (2020). "Indigeneity, gender, and resistance: Critique and contemporaneity of Bolivian anarchism in the historical imagination of Silvia Rivera Cusicanqui". Anarchist Studies. 28 (2): 19–53. doi:10.3898/AS.28.2.02. ISSN 2633-8270.
