= Horacio Pagani =

Horacio Pagani may refer to:

- Horacio Pagani (auto executive) (born 1955), Argentine founder of Pagani Automobili S.p.A.
- Horacio Pagani (sportswriter) (born 1943), Argentine sportswriter and sportscaster
