= Orazio Tedone =

Italian mathematician and physicist (1870–1922)

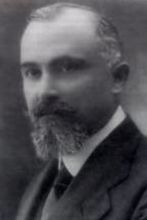

Orazio Tedone (10 March 1870, Ruvo di Puglia – 18 April 1922, Pisa) was an Italian mathematical physicist. He is perhaps best known for the Larmor–Tedone formulae for solving Maxwell's equations.

== Biography ==
Born and raised in Ruvo di Puglia, Tedone completed his undergraduate studies - his Laurea - in mathematics from the Scuola Normale Superiore di Pisa and there became an assistant and then a lecturer in rational mechanics. He became a docent at the Istituto Tecnico C. Cattaneo in Milan and then became a professor in the chair of mechanics at the University of Pavia. In 1899 he became a professor of higher analysis and static graphics at the University of Genoa, where he obtained in 1902 the chair of rational mechanics and in 1906 the chair of mathematical physics. In 1922 he accepted a professorship of mathematical physics at the University of Naples but he died in a railway accident before he could move there.

Tedone did research on theoretical mechanics, hydrodynamics (including the motions of a fluid ellipsoid), and the theory of elasticity (including an extension of Kirchhoff's formula for elastic vibrations). He also dealt with diffraction problems and Maxwell's theory of electrodynamics. He wrote the section on the mathematical theory of elasticity in the Enzyklopädie der mathematischen Wissenschaften.

In 1908 he was an Invited Speaker at the ICM in Rome. In 1911 he was elected to the Accademia Nazionale dei Lincei. In 1921 he was awarded the gold medal of the Accademia Nazionale delle Scienze detta dei XL.

His collected works were published in 1956 (Edizioni Cremonese).

He married Amalia Lojodice and they had a son, Giuseppe, who became a university docent in mathematics.

== Selected works ==
- "Sul moto di un fluido contenuto in un involucro ellissoidico solido." Il Nuovo Cimento (1877–1894) 33, no. 1 (1893): 160–179. doi:10.1007/BF02709692
- Sulla linea elastica (1894).
- "Il moto di un ellissoide fluido secondo l'ipotesi di Dirichlet." Annali della Scuola Normale Superiore di Pisa-Classe di Scienze 7 (1895): 1–4.
- Sulla integrazione dell'equazione ... (1898). doi:10.1007/BF02419185
- Sul sistema generale delle equazioni (1898).
- Sulla teoria degli spazi a curvatura costante (1899).
- Sull'equazione dell'elasticità in coordinate curvilinee (1899).
- Sulle equazioni delle vibrazioni dei corpi elastici (1900).
- "Sulle formole che rappresentano lo spostamento di un punto di un corpo elastico in equilibrio." Il Nuovo Cimento (1895–1900) 11, no. 1 (1900): 161–172. doi:10.1007/BF02720455
- "Saggio di una teoria generale delle equazioni dell'equilibrio elastico per un corpo isotropo." Annali di Matematica Pura ed Applicata (1898–1922) 10, no. 1 (1904): 13–64 doi:10.1007/BF02419375
- "Sull’equilibrio di una piastra elastica, isotropa, indefinita." Rendiconti del Circolo Matematico di Palermo (1884–1940) 18, no. 1 (1904): 368–385. doi:10.1007/BF03014112
- Sui problemi di equilibrio elastico a due dimensioni (1905).
- Un teorema dell'equazione dell'elasticità (1907).
- "Sui metodi della fisica-matematica." Annali di Matematica Pura ed Applicata (1898–1922) 15, no. 1 (1908): 127–141. doi:10.1007/BF02419758
- Sul pendolo a sospensione elastica (1913).
- Campi elettromagnetici (1915).
- Sull'integrazione di Maxwell (1916).
