= Horacio Hidrovo Velásquez =

Ecuadorian poet, novelist and short story writer

- Born: May 20, 1902; Santa Ana, Ecuador
- Died: April 19, 1962 (aged 59); Portoviejo, Ecuador
- Occupation: Writer
- Spouse: Lila Peñaherrera Encalada
- Children: Horacio Hidrovo Peñaherrera (1931-2012), Orfilia Velásquez Castro

Horacio Hidrovo Velásquez (May 20, 1902, in Santa Ana – April 19, 1962, in Portoviejo) was an Ecuadorian poet, novelist, and short story writer.

In 1957 he was the President of the House of Ecuadorian Culture, Manabi branch.

He was the father of the Ecuadorian poet Horacio Hidrovo Peñaherrera (1931-2012).

In 1961 the Ecuadorian government honored him with the Educational Merit Award.

His best known novel is Un Hombre y un Río (A Man and A River) (1957).

In 1975 his son Horacio published a collection of his poems under the title "Canción de las Voces Infinitas" (Song of the Infinite Voices), but it was not a complete collection because a great number of Hidrovo Velásquez's poems were printed in numerous magazines that are difficult to find today.

== Works ==
- “Libro Prematuro” (1920)
- “Cause"
- “Jinetes en la Noche” (1948)
- “Dimensión del Dolor” (1951)
- “Pecado de Agua Clara”
- “Un Hombre y un Río” (1957)
- "La mujer que nació así" (1927)
