= Horacio de Almeida =

East Timorese politician

Horacio de Almeida (born 16 April 1975 in Uato-Lari, Viqueque, Timor-Leste) is Deputy Provedor of Human Rights in the Office of the Provedor for Human Rights and Justice, or Provedoria dos Direitos Humanos e Justiça (PDHJ), in Timor-Leste. He has held this position since January 2015.

== Professional life ==
De Almeida worked with various UN Missions to Timor-Leste (UNMISET, UNOTIL and UNMIT) from 2002 to 2012 while also teaching in the University of Dili for over 7 years. He worked as a National Legal Adviser to the Ministry of Health of Timor-Leste on legal and procurement issues 2013 to 2014. In January 2015 he was appointed as Deputy Provedor for Human Rights and Justice (PDHJ) Timor-Leste from 2015-2018. He also worked with Ministry of Interior as National Legal Adviser (Interim Chief of Staffs) at the Office of the Minister of Interior from 2020-2023. Lastly, He also was worked with DEXIS/USAID-TL on the Accountability and Integrity Mechanism Activity (AIM) as Senior Program Manager/Deputy Chief of Party from March 2024 to March 2025.
