= Horacio Peña =

Horacio Peña may refer to:

- Horacio Peña (actor) (born 1943), Argentine actor
- Horacio Peña (author) (born 1936), Nicaraguan author and poet

== See also ==
- Horacio Piña (born 1945), Mexican baseball player
