= Jacob Adriaensz Bellevois =

Dutch Golden Age painter

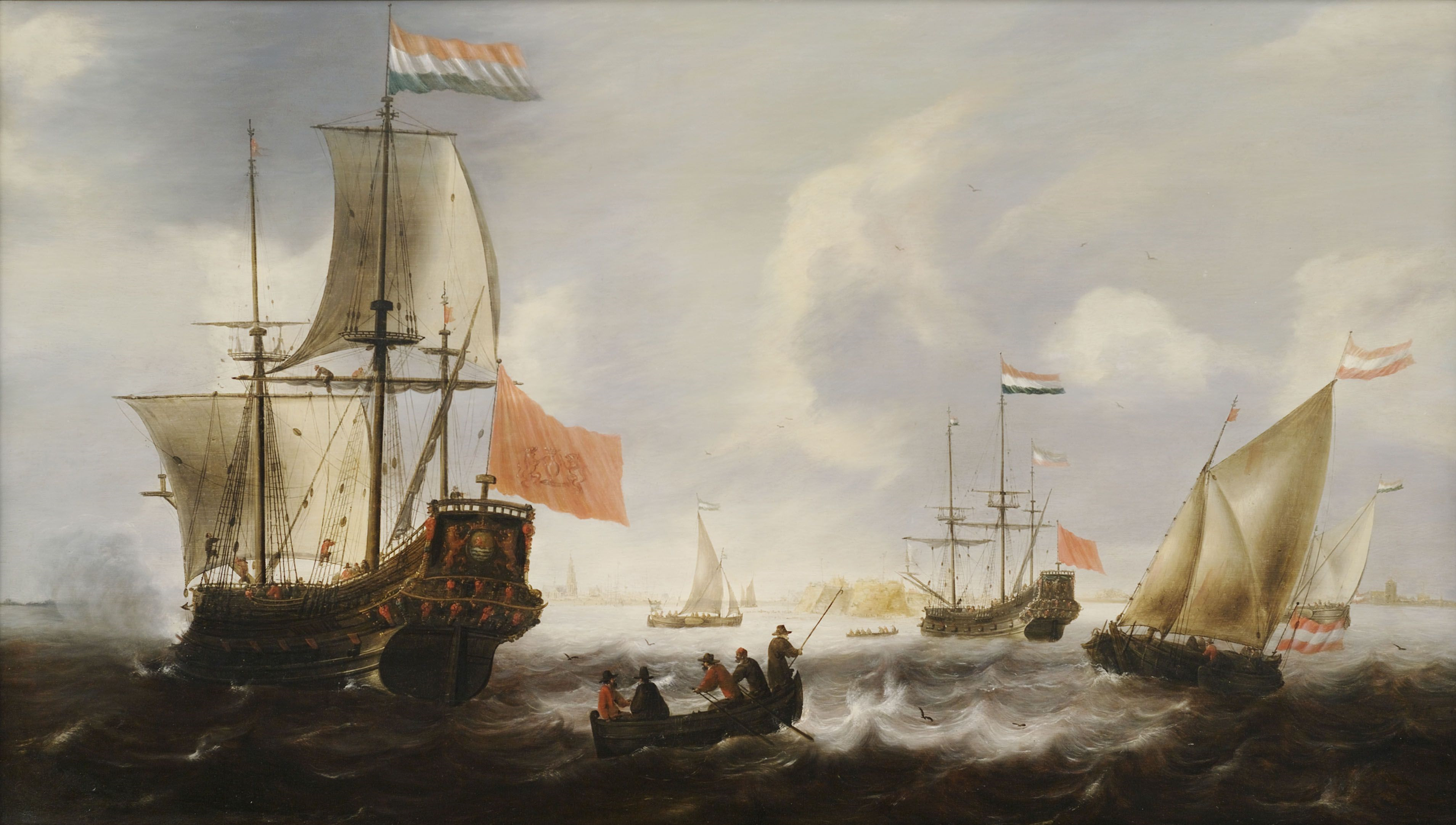
Dutch ships at the Vlissingen coast

Jacob Adriaensz Bellevois (1621, Rotterdam – 1676, Rotterdam), was a Dutch painter of marine paintings.

== Biography ==
He was born in Rotterdam as the son of Adriaen Bellevois from Ghent. It is not known with whom he studied. He married on 2 August 1643 in Rotterdam to Cornelia Uithoeks (1623-1652), daughter of a Rotterdam painter. His first wife died in 1631. He remarried in Rotterdam on 3 September 1656 to Maria 't Hert. He stayed in Rotterdam until at least 1663. He was in Gouda from 1661 to 1666, then in Hamburg in 1673 to flee the invading French armies. He was a seascape painter in Hamburg and met Johannes Voorhout while he was there.

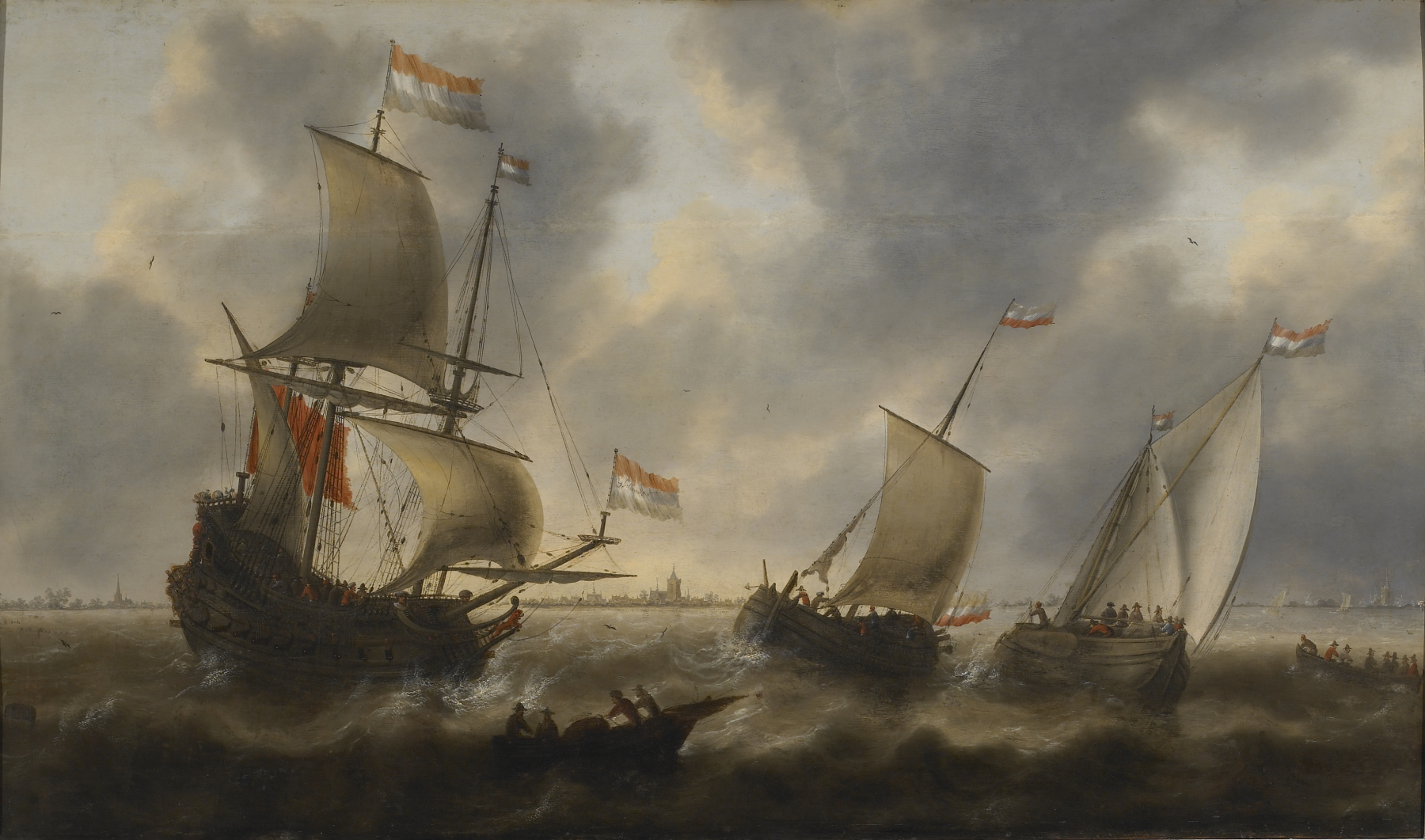
Ships at Sea, The Walters Art Museum

He returned to Rotterdam in 1675 where he lived on the Breestraat. When he died, he left a large estate.

== Work ==
He was a follower of Jan Porcellis and Simon de Vlieger and specialized in seascapes. He signed his works mainly 'J.bellevois' and sometimes 'J.Bellevois'. He only dated a few works. There does not appear to be any correlation between the form of his signature and the date. A similar town profile appears on many of the horizons in his seascapes. It is believed that this town is Schoonhoven which is near to both Rotterdam and Gouda.
