= Horacio LeDon =

Cuban American businessman

- Occupation: Founder of Horacio LeDon Real Estate
- Website: www.horacioledon.com

Horacio LeDon is a Cuban American businessman and President of Partners Trust New Development and founder of Horacio LeDon Real Estate, with offices in New York City, London, Miami, and Los Angeles.

== Career ==
As President of Development Marketing for Douglas Elliman LeDon oversaw many of the top new developments in Miami including The Edition developed by Ian Schrager, The Faena House developed by Alan Faena from Argentina, The Shore Club and many others, and has achieved the highest dollar per square foot.

Before moving back to Miami as President of Development Marketing for Douglas Elliman’s fledgling Florida unit, LeDon was Senior Vice President of Sales for Starwood Capital Group’s ST Residential Unit, overseeing west coast operations. Prior to that he spent 6 years at The Related Companies, the NY based real estate founded by Stephen M. Ross.

In 2016, LeDon joined Los Angeles real estate firm, Partners Trust as head of new development.

Ledon has been quoted in many media outlets including the New York Times, Wall Street Journal, NBC Los Angeles, Los Angeles Times, Miami Herald

LeDon currently oversees $5 billion dollars in developments in California and Florida and is currently licensed in California, New York, and Miami. He has sold over $1Billion dollars of real estate placing him in the top 3% of brokers in the United States.
