= Orazio Toscanella =

Italian philologist

Orazio Toscanella (1510-1580) was an Italian philologist, translator of Latin classics into Italian, active during the Renaissance mainly in the city of Venice.

== Biography ==
He was born in Toscanella and died in Venice. He was the author of grammar treatises, and a Latin-Italian dictionary. He was a member of the Accademia dei Pastori Fratteggiani of Fratta Polesine. This was a literary society, or salon, founded in 1555 by the patron Lucrezia Gonzaga and meeting in the Palazzo Manfrone. Among its members was Lodovico Domenichi and Girolamo Ruscelli.

He was generally indigent during his life, mainly supporting himself as a tutor in the classics.

== Works ==
- Motti, Facetie, Argutie, burle, e altre piacevolezze, 1561
- Il Dialogo della partitione oratoria di Marco Tullio Cicerone; tirato in tauole da Oratio Toscanella della famiglia di maestro Luca fiorentino: con una tauola copiosissima, 1566
- La retorica di M. Tullio Cicerone a Gaio Herennio, ridotta in alberi, con tanto ordine, & con essempi cosi chiari, & ben collocati, che ciascuno potrà da se con mirabile facilità apprenderla, 1566
- Osservationi d'Oratio Toscanella della famiglia di maestro Luca Fiorentino, sopra l'opere di Virgilio, per discoprire, e insegnare à porre in prattica gli artifici importantissimi dell'arte poetica con gli essempi di Virgilio stesso, 1566
- L'Institutioni oratorie di Marco Fabio Quintiliano retore famosissimo; tradotte da Oratio Toscanella della famiglia di maestro Luca Fiorentino : et arricchite dal medesimo della dichiaratione dei luochi piu difficili in margine: di quattro tauole ... della vita dello Autore: ..., (Venice, 1566, in quarto)
- Nomi antichi e moderni delle provincie, citta, ecc dell'Europa, Africa ed America (Venezia, 1567 in octavo)
- Precetti necessarij, overo Miscellane; parte in capi, parte in alberi, sopra diverse cose pertinenti alla grammatica, retorica, topica, loica, poetica, historia, & altre facoltà, 1567
- Armonia di tutti i principali retori, et migliori scrittori degli antichi, & nostri tempi; posta in registro, et accordata da Oratio Toscanella, 1569
- Essortatione di m. Oratio Toscanella ai cristiani contra il Turco, 1572
- Applicamento dei precetti della inventione, dispositione et elocutione, che propriamente serve allo scrittore di epistole latine, et volgari... : Aggiuntovi le quattro virtù dell'oratione, con tutte le cose, che fanno perfetta l'oratione. Et specialmente la virtù dell'ornamento...., 1575

== Bibliography ==
- Annamaria Gallina, Contributi alla storia della lessicografia italo-espagnola dei secoli XVI e XVII, Leo S. Olschki, Firenze, 1959, pp. 153–159.
- Biblioteca Virtual de la Filologia Espanola. Toscanella, Orazio (1520-1580).
