= Horacio Hidrovo Peñaherrera =

Ecuadorian poet, writer, professor and cultural promoter

- Born: June 24, 1931; Santa Ana, Ecuador
- Died: June 9, 2012 (aged 80)
- Occupations: Poet, Writer
- Writing career
- Notable works: La Montaña, La maravillosa sensación de vivir

Horacio Hidrovo Peñaherrera (June 24, 1931 – June 9, 2012) was an Ecuadorian poet, writer, professor, and cultural promoter.

He inherited his passion for poetry from his father, the poet Horacio Hidrovo Velásquez. In 2009 he was awarded Ecuador's National Prize "Premio Eugenio Espejo" in the Cultural Activities category.

He was born in Santa Ana, Ecuador in 1931. He was a literature professor at the University Laica Eloy Alfaro in Manabi, where he sought to strengthen oral tradition, theater and music.

Among his most popular poetry books were La maravillosa sensación de vivir (2001) and La Montaña (2003).

== Works ==
- El montonero de Montecristi (1992)
- Jinetes en la noche (1948)
- Historia de la literatura manabita (1974)
- Se vende una ciudad: novela (1979)
- La usurpación de la tierra en América Latina (1991)
- Esperanza y desesperanza del montubio manabita (1991)
- Tauras o muertos que estan vivos (1985)
- Dimensión del dolor: poesía (1951)
- La mujer que nació así: novela (1982)
- Canto junto al fuego de los siglos (1978)
- Manzanas para los niños del mundo: poesía (1973)
- Los pájaros son hijos del viento: poesía (1987)
- La danza de los ángeles (2004)
- La novela (1975)
- La montaña (2003)
- Las huelas de tus sandalias (1974)
- La soledad es un domingo largo (2007)
- La novela manabita y su identidad regional: ensayo (1979)
- Album fotográfico de Manabí (1998) with Tatiana Hidrovo Quiñónez
- La maravillosa sensación de vivir (2001)
