= Horatio, Pennsylvania =

Unincorporated community in Pennsylvania, U.S.

Coordinates: 40°55′45″N 79°00′56″W

Horatio is an unincorporated community in Jefferson County, in the U.S. state of Pennsylvania.

== History ==
Horatio got its start circa 1887 as a mining community when a railroad line was extended to the mines at that point. A post office was established at Horatio in 1888, and remained in operation until 1920.
