= Horacio Farach =

Argentine physicist

Horacio A. Farach is an Argentine physicist.

Farach earned his masters degree and doctorate at the University of Buenos Aires, and taught at his alma mater between 1965 and 1967, before joining the University of South Carolina faculty. He retired from USC in 2004 and was granted emeritus status. In 1977, he was elected a fellow the American Physical Society.

== Selected publications ==
- Poole, Charles P.; Farach, Horacio, eds. (1994). Handbook of Electron Spin Resonance: Data Sources, Computer Technology, Relaxation and ENDOR. American Institute of Physics. ISBN 1-563-96044-3.
- Poole, Charles P.; Datta, T.; Farach, Horacio A., eds. (1988). Copper Oxide Superconductors. Wiley-Interscience. ISBN 9780471623427.
- Poole Jr., Charles P.; Farach, Horacio A., eds. (1972). The Theory of Magnetic Resonance. Wiley-Interscience.
