= Orazio Orazi =

Italian painter (1848–1912)

Orazio Orazi (September 21, 1848 – September 22, 1912) was an Italian priest and painter. He is best known for his depictions of sacred subjects for churches in the Province of Macerata.

== Biography ==
He was born in Camerino. After studying at a seminary in Camerino, he was ordained a priest, but obtained permission to study painting in Rome for twelve years in the studio of Luigi Fontana, then in the Roman Academy of San Luca (Academy of Fine Arts).

In 1880 he painted an Addolorata for the church of Massaprofoglio, neighborhood of Muccia, in Province of Macerata. In 1883 in Rome, he displayed a canvas depicting: The funeral of the Blessed Camilla Battista da Varano of the Duchy of Camerino. At the 1884 National Exposition of Turin, he exhibited a Santa Lucia before Paschasius, Roman prefect of Syracuse, now at the church of San Venanzio in Camerino. In 1889 painted the fresco murals of the apse of the church del convent of the Passionists at Sant’Angelo in Pontano with scenes of the life of the Virgin.

In 1891, he completed an altarpiece depicting Apparition of the Sacred Heart to Blessed Margaret Mary Alacoque for the Shrine of the Virgin of the Rosary of Pompei. In 1892, he was commissioned to paint a copy of the San Damiano Crucifix for the church of San Francesco in Pontelatrave, a neighborhood of Camerino.

Orazi also painted fresco decorations. For example, he completed cycle of frescoes, painted in encaustic, for the church of Santa Maria in Via, Camerino. Among the subjects he depicted were The Eternal amid angels in the apse; the Coronation of the Virgin in the arches; and Arrival to Church from Smyrna of the Icon of the Virgin from Smyrna and a Coronation of the Icon on June 14, 1864 in the crossing. In 1903, he painted St Peter with the Cock for the church of San Pietro a Montegranaro at Fermo. In 1906, he decorated the presbytery of the church of the Blessed Anthony of Amandola in Fermo, depicting scenes from Anthony's life. In 1911 he painted a Madonna and Child with Saints Dominic and Catherine for the church of Sant'Urbano in Apiro.

Other works attributed to Orazi are altarpieces in the church of S. Lorenzo at Mergo in the Province of Ancona (St Peter) and in the church of San Giacomo at Camerino, (Saints Lucy and Judah).

Orazi died in 1912 in Camerino.
