= Attilio Degrassi =

Italian Latin scholar and archeologist (1887–1969)

Attilio Degrassi (Trieste, 21 June 1887 – Rome, 1 June 1969) was an archeologist and pioneering Italian scholar of Latin epigraphy.

Degrassi taught at the University of Padua where he trained, among others, the epigraphist Silvio Panciera, currently on the faculty of the University of Rome "La Sapienza".

As an epigraphist Degrassi was extremely influential, not only in collecting and publishing inscriptions, but also in defining the discipline and training some of those who would become its leading practitioners. He was elected an International Member of the American Philosophical Society in 1958.

== ILLRP ==
Especially influential was Degrassi's work Inscriptiones latinae liberae rei publicae (abbreviated ILLRP), a collection of Latin inscriptions from the Roman Republic that appeared between 1957 and 1963 in two volumes. ILLRP "largely replaced" the first volume of the Corpus Inscriptionum Latinarum and was accessible to scholars and students alike. The ILLRP is frequently referenced for the fasti consulares. A review of the work in the journal Classical Philology praised the quality of Degrassi's editing and the importance of the collection.

== Works ==
1. Inscriptiones Italiae (1937–1963)
2. I fasti consolari dell'impero romano dal 30 avanti Cristo al 613 dopo Cristo (1952).
3. Fasti Capitolini (1954).
4. Il confine nord-orientale dell'Italia romana : ricerche storico-topografiche (1954).
5. Quattuorviri in colonie romane e in municipi retti da duoviri (1957).
6. Inscriptiones latinae liberae rei publicae (1957–1963).
7. Scritti vari di antichità, raccolti da amici e allievi nel 75° compleanno dell'autore (1962).
8. Inscriptiones Latinae liberae rei publicae: imagines. Consilio et auctoritate Academiae Scientiarum (1965); images
9. Epigrafia latina. Con un'appendice bibliografica di Attilio Degrassi (1968).
10. Epigrafia: actes du Colloque international d'épigraphie latine en mémoire de Attilio Degrassi (1988).

== Sources ==
- Franco Sartori. "Attilio Degrassi (1887-1969)," in Praelectiones Patavinae (1972) 75–87.
- Panciera, Silvio (1971). "Attilio Degrassi". Gnomon. 43 (7): 733–736. JSTOR 27685342.
