= Santa Ana Canton, Ecuador =

Santa Ana Canton
- Canton
- Location of Manabí Province in Ecuador.

- Santa Ana Canton in Manabí Province
- Coordinates: 1.2069°S 80.3709°W
- Country: Ecuador
- Province: Manabí Province

Population (2001)
  - Total: 45,287
- Time zone: UTC-5 (ECT)

Santa Ana Canton is a canton of Ecuador, located in the Manabí Province. Its capital is the town of Santa Ana. Its population at the 2001 census was 45,287.

== Demographics ==
Ethnic groups as of the Ecuadorian census of 2010:

- Mestizo 50.3%
- Montubio 42.1%
- Afro-Ecuadorian 3.9%
- White 3.6%
- Indigenous 0.1%
- Other 0.1%

== Climate ==
Climate data for Santa Ana, elevation 50 m (160 ft), (1961–1990)
| Month | Jan | Feb | Mar | Apr | May | Jun | Jul | Aug | Sep | Oct | Nov | Dec | Year |
|---|---|---|---|---|---|---|---|---|---|---|---|---|---|
| Mean daily maximum °C (°F) | 31.5 (88.7) | 31.2 (88.2) | 31.7 (89.1) | 32.5 (90.5) | 31.5 (88.7) | 30.3 (86.5) | 30.3 (86.5) | 31.3 (88.3) | 32.0 (89.6) | 31.7 (89.1) | 31.2 (88.2) | 31.7 (89.1) | 31.4 (88.5) |
| Daily mean °C (°F) | 25.8 (78.4) | 26.1 (79.0) | 26.5 (79.7) | 26.6 (79.9) | 26.2 (79.2) | 25.5 (77.9) | 25.2 (77.4) | 25.2 (77.4) | 25.5 (77.9) | 25.7 (78.3) | 25.7 (78.3) | 26.0 (78.8) | 25.8 (78.5) |
| Mean daily minimum °C (°F) | 21.2 (70.2) | 21.7 (71.1) | 21.7 (71.1) | 21.6 (70.9) | 21.0 (69.8) | 20.3 (68.5) | 19.7 (67.5) | 19.3 (66.7) | 19.6 (67.3) | 20.1 (68.2) | 19.8 (67.6) | 20.6 (69.1) | 20.6 (69.0) |
| Average precipitation mm (inches) | 128.0 (5.04) | 164.0 (6.46) | 201.0 (7.91) | 117.0 (4.61) | 50.0 (1.97) | 46.0 (1.81) | 10.0 (0.39) | 2.0 (0.08) | 4.0 (0.16) | 1.0 (0.04) | 3.0 (0.12) | 18.0 (0.71) | 744 (29.3) |
Source: FAO
