= Orazio Giaccio =

Italian composer

Orazio Giaccio (fl. 1610s) was an Italian composer. His canzonetta Laberinto amoroso was published in Naples by Gargano and Nucci in 1618.
