= Horatia gens =

Ancient Roman family

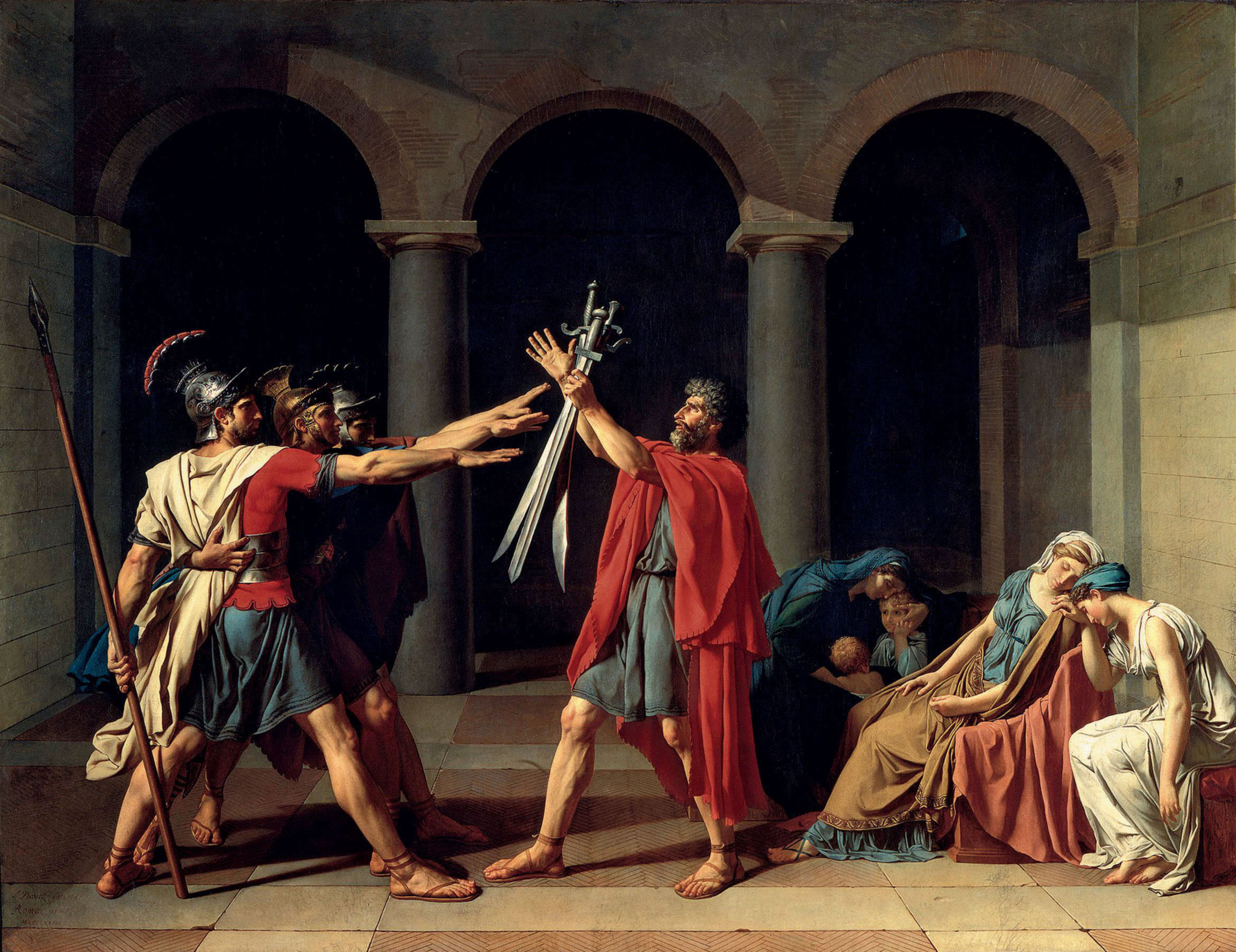
Oath of the Horatii Jacques-Louis David, Louvre Museum (1785)

The gens Horatia was a patrician family at ancient Rome. In legend, the gens dates back to the time of Tullus Hostilius, the third King of Rome. One of its members, Marcus Horatius Pulvillus, was consul suffectus in 509 BC, the first year of the Republic, and again in 507. The most famous of the Horatii was his nephew, Publius Horatius Cocles, who held the Sublician bridge against the army of Lars Porsena circa 508 BC.

== Origin ==
The nomen Horatius is said to have been derived from the hero Horatus, to whom an oak wood was dedicated. The gens was certainly of Latin origin, although there was some uncertainty as to when they arrived at Rome. A legend relates that in the reign of Tullus Hostilius, the fate of the ancient city of Alba Longa was decided by combat between three brothers from that city and three from Rome. The historian Livy states that most sources assigned the Horatii to Rome, and their opponents, the Curiatii, to Alba Longa. The victory of the Horatii was a pretext for the destruction of Alba Longa, and the transfer of its noble families to Rome.

== Praenomina ==
The patrician Horatii used the praenomina Publius, Marcus, Lucius, and Gaius. To these, the plebeian Horatii of the late Republic and imperial times added Quintus and Sextus. No other praenomina are found in epigraphic sources, with the possible exception of a single instance of Titus, but the reading of this inscription is uncertain.

== Branches and cognomina ==
The Horatii of the Republic bore the surnames Barbatus, Cocles, and Pulvillus. Of these, Barbatus and Pulvillus were cognomina designating different branches of the family, while Cocles appears to have been a personal surname, or agnomen, given to the hero of the Sublician bridge. Plutarch supposes that it was derived from the Greek cyclops, because he had lost an eye, or because the shape of his face made it appear as if he had but one eye. Cocles is said to have been the nephew of Marcus Horatius Pulvillus, and if he left any issue, they do not seem to have carried on his surname. Other surnames appearing amongst the Horatii in later times may have been adopted by freedmen of the gens; the poet Horace was the son of a libertinus, and the cognomen Flaccus is not otherwise found amongst the Horatii.

== Members ==
This list includes abbreviated praenomina. For an explanation of this practice, see filiation.

=== Early Horatii ===
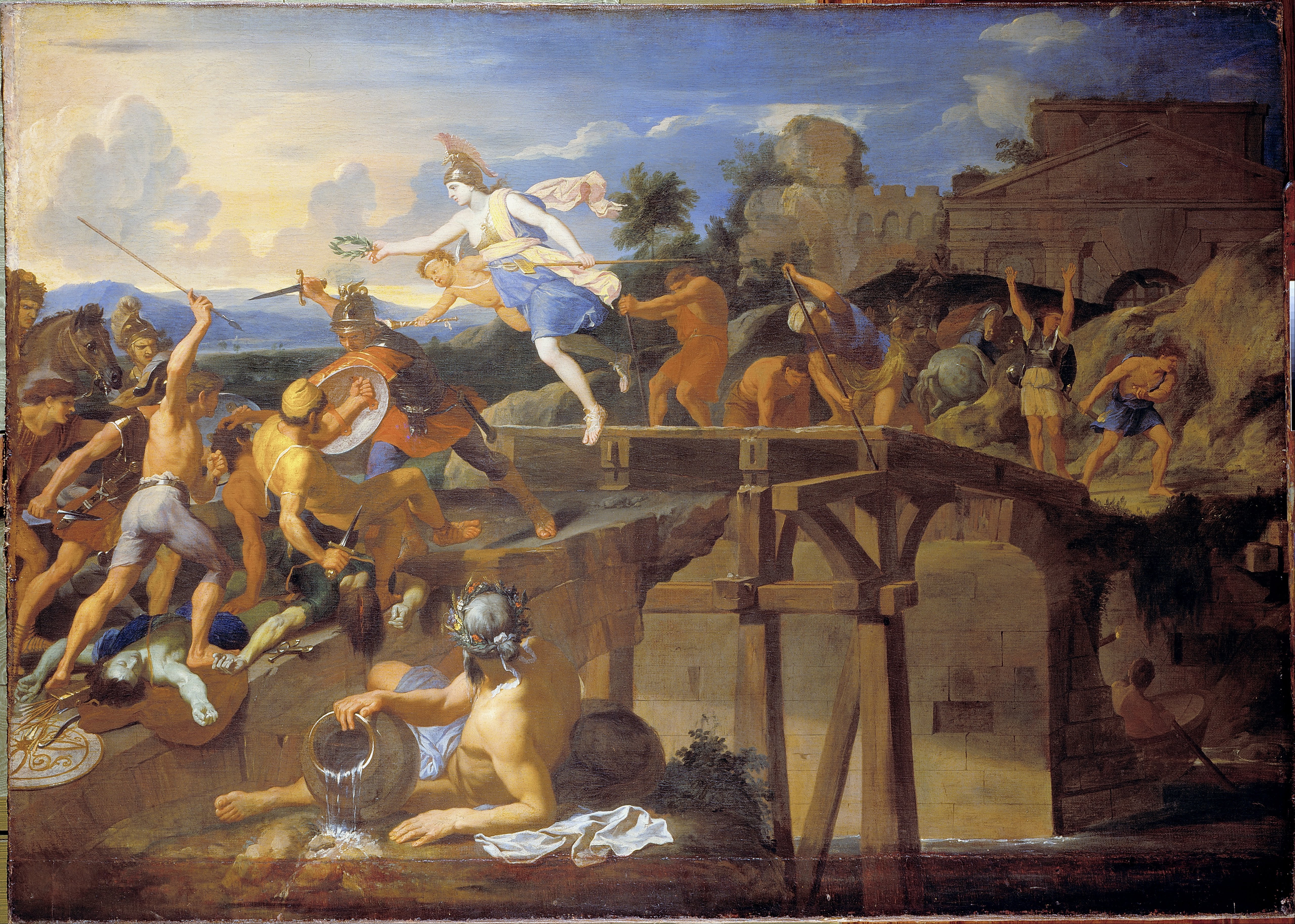
Horatius Cocles defending the Bridge (1642–43) by Charles Le Brun

- Publius Horatius, father of the Horatii who fought against the Curiatii, absolved his son of guilt in the death of his sister. In some versions of the story, his praenomen is Marcus.
- Publius Horatius, one of the Horatii, three brothers who fought against the three Curiatii in the reign of Tullus Hostilius; and the sole survivor of the combat. Enraged by his sister's grief for one of the slain Curiatii, to whom she had been betrothed, he slew her as well, and by custom his life was forfeit; but their father decreed that in light of his service to his country, his penance was to pass under the yoke.
- Horatia Camilla, sister of the Horatii, was betrothed to one of the Curiatii, and because of her display of grief was slain by her victorious brother. An ancient tomb near the Porta Capena was said to have been hers.

=== Horatii Pulvilli ===
- Marcus Horatius Pulvillus, father of the consul of 509, and according to legend, grandfather of Publius Horatius Cocles.
- Marcus Horatius M. f. Pulvillus, consul suffectus in 509 BC, the first year of the Republic; he was consul again in 507.
- Publius Horatius — f. M. n. Cocles, one of the heroes of the Republic, defended the Sublician bridge against the army of Lars Porsena, circa 508 BC, was a nephew of the consul Marcus Horatius Pulvillus.
- Gaius Horatius M. f. M. n. Pulvillus, consul in 477 and 457 BC; he defeated the Aequi.
- Publius Horatius (Pulvillus), according to Dionysius of Halicarnassus, one of the consuls in 453 BC; other sources give Publius Curiatius Fistus Trigeminus.
- Lucius Horatius Pulvillus, consular tribune in 386 BC.
- Marcus Horatius Pulvillus, consular tribune in 378 BC.

=== Horatii Barbati ===
- Marcus Horatius M. f. L. n. Barbatus, (Note: M. f. P. n., according to an Augustan-era inscription from the Alban Mount, but L. n. in the Fasti Triumphales.) with Lucius Valerius Potitus, helped to abolish the decemvirate in 449 BC; the two elected consuls for the same year; Horatius triumphed over the Sabines.
- Lucius Horatius M. f. M. n. Barbatus, consular tribune in 425 BC.

=== Others ===
- Lucius Horatius L. f., one of the aediles at Aquileia in Venetia and Histria, together with his colleague, Gaius Lucretius, made a religious donation recorded in an inscription from the early to middle part of the second century BC.
- Horatius Balbus, built a sepulchre at Sassina in Umbria, dating from the middle of the first century BC.
- Quintus Horatius Flaccus, better known as Horace, a poet in the time of Augustus, during the first century BC.
- Lucius Horatius L. f., buried at Casilinum in Campania, in a tomb dating from the latter half of the first century BC, built by his freedwoman, identified in the inscription as "Silenium".
- Horatius Antipatrus, named on a plaster inscription dedicated to the gods at Virunum in Noricum, dating from the latter half of the first century BC.
- Lucius Horatius L. f. L. n., named in a sepulchral inscription from Tibur in Latium, dating between the middle of the first century BC and the middle of the first century AD.
- Publius Horatius P. f., a native of Malaca in Hispania Citerior, named in a dedicatory inscription from Ilici, also in Hispania Citerior, dating from the late first century BC.
- Horatius C. l. Dio, a freedman buried at Venusia in Samnium in the late first century BC or early first century AD.
- Quintus Horatius Narcissus, buried at Rome, with a monument dating from the late first century BC or early first century AD.
- Horatia Q. l. Prima, a freedwoman buried in a family sepulchre at Stabiae in Campania, dating between the late first century BC and early first century AD, built from the proceeds of the will of Lucius Scanius for himself, Horatia Prima, perhaps his wife, and his parents, Lucius Scanius and Veratia Galla.
- Lucius Horatius L. f., one of the priests at the Colony of Sutrium in Etruria, named in an inscription dating between the late first century BC and the middle of the first century AD.
- Marcus Horatius M. f. Bodonilur, one of the municipal duumvirs at Urgalo Alba in Hispania Baetica in the late first century BC or early first century AD. His wife was Lucretia Sergieton.
- Marcus Horatius, named in a sepulchral inscription from Tarvisium in Venetia and Histria, dating from the reign of Augustus.
- Marcus Horatius M. l. Protus, a freedman, and the heir of Gaius Mevius Rodonis, also a freedman, built a tomb at Rome, dating from the first half of the first century, for himself and his family.
- Lucius Horatius M. f. Viseradin, buried at the site of modern Requena, formerly part of Hispania Citerior, in a tomb dating from the early or middle part of the first century.
- Horatius Amadio, perhaps a merchant, and the recipient of some Liquamen, or fish sauce, named in an inscription from Pompeii in Campania.
- Lucius Horatius Longus, was tribune of the second cohort of the Vigiles, and subsequently one of the duumvirs at Tarvisium in Venetia and Histria. He was buried in a first century tomb built by his clients, Gaius Publicius Anteros and Lucius Publicius Perennis.
- Horatius Lupus, named in a first-century sepulchral inscription from Forum Livii in Cisalpine Gaul.
- Marcus Horatius R[...], named in a first-century inscription from Tarraco in Hispania Citerior.
- Gaius Horatius [...]us, served as princeps praetorius, an officer in the Legio IV Macedonica, stationed at Cremona in Venetia and Histria in AD 45.
- Sextus Horatius Diadumenus, inurned at Rome, in a columbarium made for Diadumenus, Quintus Caulius Carpus, and Caulia Trophime, dating from the latter half of the first century.
- Publius Horatius P. f. Florus, one of the quattuorvirs at Comum in Gallia Narbonensis, buried with his wife, Novellia Rufa, in a tomb built by their daughter, Horatia Maxima, dating from the first or second century.
- Horatia P. f. P. n. Maxima, the daughter of Publius Horatius Florus and Novellia Rufa, built a tomb at Comum for her parents, dating from the first or second century.
- Marcus Horatius Mercurialis, buried at the site of modern Requena, aged fifty-eight, in a tomb built by his wife, Fabricia Serana, dating between the middle of the first century and the middle of the second.
- Horatius Mercurialis, together with Licinia Limphidia, built a tomb at Requena, dating between the middle of the first century and the middle of the second, for Junia Cupida, aged fifty-five. Possibly the same person as Marcus Horatius Mercurialis, the husband of Fabricia Serana.
- Horatia Vitalis, built a tomb at Edeta in Hispania Citerior, dating from the late first or early second century, for herself and her son, Marcus Horatius Vitalio.
- Marcus Horatius Vitalio, a youth buried at Edeta, aged twelve, in a tomb built by his mother, Horatia Vitalis, for herself and her son, dating from the late first or early second century.
- Marcus Horatius Numisianus, a soldier in the Cohors II Lusitanorum, a Roman Auxiliary unit from Lusitania stationed in Roman Egypt in AD 109, during the reign of Trajan.
- Horatia L. f. Mustia, buried at Castellum Celtianum in Numidia, aged eighty, in a tomb dating from the first half of the second century.
- Horatia Q. f. Sabina, a woman buried at Castellum Celtianum, aged forty-five, in a tomb dating from the first half of the second century.
- Quintus Horatius Q. f. Baricio, buried in a second-century tomb at Castellum Celtianum, aged forty-five.
- Lucius Horatius Crescens, buried in a second-century tomb at Castellum Celtianum, aged one hundred and ten.
- Horatia Eutychia, the patron of Marcus Horatius Trophimus and Horatia Tryphosa, who built a second-century tomb for her at Puteoli in Campania.
- Sextus Horatius Felix, buried in a second-century tomb at Castellum Celtianum, aged one hundred.
- Quintus Horatius Fuscus, the father of Horatia Saturnina, a woman buried in a second century tomb at Lambaesis in Numidia.
- Horatia Ingenua, a girl buried in a second-century tomb at Castellum Celtianum, aged twelve.
- Horatia Lucida, a woman buried in a second-century tomb at Castellum Celtianum, aged fifty.
- Horatia Q. f. Pocula, (Note: Her surname should probably be Procula, as with another woman of the same place named Horatia Procula.) a woman buried in a second-century tomb at Castellum Celtianum, aged thirty-five.
- Horatia Procula, a woman buried in a second-century tomb at Castellum Celtianum, aged sixty-two.
- Gaius Horatius Sabinus, one of the worshippers whose names are inscribed on a second-century temple foundation from Philippi in Macedonia. He provided four hundred tiles.
- Horatia Q. f. Saturnina, the daughter of Quintus Horatius Fuscus, and wife of Gaius Mustius Fortunatus, both veterans. She was buried in a second-century tomb built by her husband at Lambaesis.
- Gaius Horatius Secundus, buried in a second-century tomb at Castellum Celtianum, aged seventy-five.
- Marcus Horatius Trophimus, together with Horatia Tryphosa, built a second-century tomb at Puteoli for their patron, Horatia Eutychia.
- Horatia Tryphosa, together with Marcus Horatius Trophimus, built a second-century tomb at Puteoli for their patron, Horatia Eutychia.
- Horatia Tuta, a woman buried in a second-century tomb at Castellum Celtianum, aged eighty.
- Horatius Rogatus, an imperial procurator, named in an inscription from Rome, dating between the death of Trajan and the end of the third century.
- Horatia C. f. Fortunata, inurned at Rome, in a cinerarium dating from the reign of Antoninus Pius.
- Horatius Rusticus, buried at Castellum Celtianum, aged seventy-five, in a tomb dating from the latter half of the second century.
- Horatius Alio, the son of Ligirus, buried in a second- or third-century tomb at the present site of Fresno de Río Tirón, formerly part of Hispania Citerior, aged fifty.
- Marcus Horatius M. f., buried at Apulum in Dacia, in a tomb dating from the second or third century.
- Horatia Monnula, buried at Cirta in Numidia, in a tomb dating from the late second or early third century.
- Publius Horatius Chryseros, one of the Seviri Augustales at Ostia in AD 182, named along with Sextus Horatius Chyrserotianus in an inscription recording donations for the erecting of a statue.
- Sextus Horatius Chryserotianus, named along with the priest Publius Horatius Chryseros in an inscription recording donations for the erecting of a statue at Ostia in AD 182.
- Horatius Viator, named in a dedicatory inscription from Cuicul in Numidia, dating from AD 210.
- Horatia Maxima, buried at Lambaesis, aged eighty, in a third-century tomb built by her freedman and client, Quintus Horatius Pankalio.
- Quintus Horatius Ɔ. l. Pankalio, the freedman and client of Horatia Maxima, for whom he built a third-century tomb at Lambaesis.
- Horatius Paritor, one of the municipal duumvirs at Lambaesis, named in an inscription dating between AD 257 and 260.

=== Undated Horatii ===
- Caerellius Horatius, a youth buried at Thubursicum in Numidia, aged fifteen.
- Claudius Horatius, made an offering at Aquae Flaviae in Hispania Citerior.
- Horatius, together with a certain Cassius, probably the duumvirs of Banasa in Mauretania Tingitana in an uncertain year, made an inscription dedicated to the local gods.
- Gaius Horatius, named in an inscription from Rome, dated the fifth day before the Kalends of September, (Note: August 28.) together with a woman named Laelia, dated the day before the Kalends of November. (Note: November 1)
- Lucius Horatius L. f., a holitor, or dealer in vegetables, buried at Rome, together with Sextus Horatius, perhaps his brother.
- Sextus Horatius L. f., buried at Rome, together with the holitor Lucius Horatius, perhaps his brother.
- Publius Horatius, buried at Ostia, in a tomb built by his son, also named Publius.
- Publius Horatius P. f., built a tomb at Ostia for his father, also named Publius.
- Quintus Horatius Ɔ. l. Aca[...], a freedman, built a tomb at Rome for his wife and conliberta, (Note: Meaning that he and his wife were manumitted by the same woman.) Horatia Attica.
- Horatia C. f. Achaica, a woman buried at Rusicade in Numidia, aged forty-nine.
- Horatia Ɔ. l. Attica, buried at Rome, aged thirty, in a tomb built by her husband and conlibertus, Quintus Horatius Aca[...].
- Publius Horatius Callistus, built a tomb at Rome for his wife, Memmia Menophila.
- Horatia L. l. Chia, a freedwoman named in an inscription from Rome.
- Gaius Horatius C. l. Chrysaor, a freedman buried at Cirta, aged thirty-two.
- Horatia Communis, buried at Tusculum in Latium, aged thirty-five, in a family sepulchre built by her husband, Tiberius Claudius Rhodocles for himself, his wife, and their sons, Tiberius Claudius Gratus Petronianus, aged fifteen, and Tiberius Claudius Terminalis, aged twenty-seven.
- Horatia Cornelia, buried at Rome, in a tomb built by Marcus Aebutius Hermes and Quintus Magius Eutrapelus for themselves, Aebutia Marcia, the wife of Hermes, Horatia Cornelia, and Fabia Chrysis.
- Publius Horatius Crescens, the father of Publius Horatius Restitutianus, a municipal official of Cirta in Numidia.
- Horatia Donata, buried at Patavium in Venetia and Histria.
- Publius Horatius Felix, buried at Lambiridi in Numidia, aged fifty-six, in a tomb built by his wife, Arrania Marina.
- Sextus Horatius Sex. f. Felix, a sacerdos, or priest, of Bellona at Rusicade. Together with his sons, Proculus, Triumphalis, and Felix, also sacerdotes, they helped to renovate and decorate the temple there.
- Sextus Horatius Sex. f. Sex. n. Felix, one of the sons of Sextus Horatius Felix, a priest of Bellona at Rusicade. Together with his father and brothers, Proculus and Triumphalis, he renovated and decorated Bellona's temple.
- Horatia M. l. Festa, a freedwoman buried at Pola in Venetia and Histria.
- Horatius Honestus, dedicated a poem for the monument of a freedman of the imperial household at Lugdunum in Gallia Lugdunensis.
- Quintus Horatius Hyla, a potter whose maker's mark has been found on ceramics from Rome, Velitrae in Latium, Pisaurum in Umbria, and Ariminum in Cisalpine Gaul.
- Horatia Laeta, dedicated a tomb at Trea in Picenum for someone whose name has not been preserved.
- Horatius Macer, one of the epulones, commemorated in an inscription dedicated to Cybele at the site of modern Marano Equo in Latium.
- Horatius Marcianus, dedicated a monument at Saldae in Mauretania Caesariensis in honor of his friend, Annius Postumus, who had been procurator Augusti of Pannonia Inferior, among other posts.
- Horatia Marisa, buried at Thibilis in Numidia, aged one hundred and five.
- (Titus?) Horatius Martialis, made a donation to the imperial cult at Cirta.
- Horatius Martialis Rufinus, named in an inscription honoring a woman named Surdinia, found at Vaga in Africa Proconsularis.
- Horatius Maximus, a pontifex at Thamugadi in Numidia.
- Horatius Nepos, named in a sepulchral inscription from Iader in Dalmatia.
- Horatia Ped[ania?], a girl buried at Siarum in Hispania Baetica, aged eleven.
- Horatia Procula, named along with a number of other women in an inscription from Cirta.
- Sextus Horatius Sex. f. Sex. n. Proculus, one of the sons of Sextus Horatius Felix, a priest of Bellona at Rusicade. Together with his father and brothers, Felix and Triumphalis, he renovated and decorated Bellona's temple.
- Publius Horatius P. f. Restitutianus, the son of Publius Horatius Crescens, was a municipal official of Cirta, named in a monument from Verecunda in Numidia.
- Horatia Q. f. [...]ria, buried at Lambaesis with a monument from her husband, Lucius Spellatius Saturninus, who called her the kindest and most loving, and his Juno.
- Quintus Horatius Tarsus, buried at Rome, aged fifty, in a family sepulchre built by his wife, Taementuli Sedata.
- Sextus Horatius Sex. f. Sex. n. Triumphalis, one of the sons of Sextus Horatius Felix, a priest of Bellona at Rusicade. Together with his father and brothers, Proculus and Felix, he renovated and decorated Bellona's temple.
- Horatius Victor, buried at Cirta, aged ninety-five.
- Lucius Horatius L. f. Victor, one of the municipal duumvirs at Hispalis in Hispania Baetica.

== See also ==
- List of Roman gentes

== Bibliography ==
- Marcus Tullius Cicero, De Republica, Pro Milone.
- Diodorus Siculus, Bibliotheca Historica (Library of History).
- Dionysius of Halicarnassus, Romaike Archaiologia (Roman Antiquities).
- Titus Livius (Livy), History of Rome.
- Valerius Maximus, Factorum ac Dictorum Memorabilium (Memorable Facts and Sayings).
- Lucius Annaeus Seneca (Seneca the Younger), Epistulae Morales ad Lucilium (Moral Letters to Lucilius).
- Lucius Mestrius Plutarchus (Plutarch), Lives of the Noble Greeks and Romans.
- Lucius Annaeus Florus, Epitome de T. Livio Bellorum Omnium Annorum DCC (Epitome of Livy: All the Wars of Seven Hundred Years).
- Sextus Aurelius Victor, De Viris Illustribus (On Famous Men).
- Joannes Zonaras, Epitome Historiarum (Epitome of History).
- Dictionary of Greek and Roman Biography and Mythology, William Smith, ed., Little, Brown and Company, Boston (1849).
- Theodor Mommsen et alii, Corpus Inscriptionum Latinarum (The Body of Latin Inscriptions, abbreviated CIL), Berlin-Brandenburgische Akademie der Wissenschaften (1853–present).
- René Cagnat et alii, L'Année épigraphique (The Year in Epigraphy, abbreviated AE), Presses Universitaires de France (1888–present).
- Hermann Dessau, Inscriptiones Latinae Selectae (Select Latin Inscriptions), Berlin (1892–1916).
- Stéphane Gsell, Inscriptions Latines de L'Algérie (Latin Inscriptions from Algeria), Edouard Champion, Paris (1922–present).
- Inscriptiones Italiae (Inscriptions from Italy), Rome (1931–present).
- T. Robert S. Broughton, The Magistrates of the Roman Republic, American Philological Association (1952–1986).
- Inscriptions antiques du Maroc, vol. 2: Latin Inscriptions, Paris (1982).
- Hispania Epigraphica (Epigraphy of Spain), Madrid (1989–present).
- J. González Fernández, "La Campiña, Sevilla", in Corpus de Inscripciones Latinas de Andalucia (1996).
- Manfred Clauss, Anne Kolb, & Wolfgang A. Slaby, Epigraphik Datenbank Clauss/Slaby (abbreviated EDCS).
