= Fortune teller (disambiguation) =

A fortune teller is someone who practices fortune-telling.

Fortune teller may also refer to:

== Film ==
- The Fortune Teller (1920 film), 1920 American film directed by Albert Capellani
- The Fortune Teller (1956 film), English title for I kafetzou, 1956 Greek film directed by Alekos Sakellarios
- Fortune Teller (2009 film), 2009 Chinese documentary directed by Xu Tong
- The Fortune Tellers, alternate title for Ghost Sweepers, a 2012 South Korean film

== Music ==
- The Fortune Teller (operetta), an operetta in three acts written by Victor Herbert
- Fortune Teller (album), 2008 album by Ira Losco
- "Fortune Teller" (song), a 1962 song written by Allen Toussaint, covered by many artists
- "Fortuneteller" (song), a 1962 song written by Dyer and Basil Hurdon
- "Fortune Teller", a song by Deep Purple from their 1990 album Slaves and Masters
- "Fortune Teller", a song by Sugar from their 1992 album Copper Blue
- "Fortune Teller", a song by Ash from their 1998 album Nu-Clear Sounds
- "Fortune Teller", a song by Fourplay from their 2008 album Energy
- "Fortune Teller", a song by Maroon 5 group from their 2012 album Overexposed
- "Fortune Teller", a song by Calexico from their 2012 album Algiers

== Painting ==
- The Fortune Teller (Caravaggio), a painting of 1594 by Italian Baroque master Michelangelo Merisi da Caravaggio
- The Fortune Teller (Boulogne), by Valentin de Boulogne, 1620
- The Fortune Teller (La Tour), a painting of circa 1630 by the French artist Georges de La Tour, depicting a similar subject
- A Fortune-Teller, a 1777 painting by Joshua Reynolds
- Josephine and the Fortune-Teller, an 1837 painting by David Wilkie
- The Fortune Teller (Poynter), an 1877 painting by Edward Poynter

== Television ==
- "Fortune Teller", an episode of Strange Experiences
- "Fortune Teller", a live-action episode of The Super Mario Bros. Super Show!
- "The Fortuneteller", an episode of the animated TV series Avatar: The Last Airbender

== Other uses ==
- Fortune-teller (racehorse), a competitor who failed to complete the 1848 Grand National
- Fortune teller machine
- Paper fortune teller, a type of origami
