= Tribute to Caesar =

Tribute to Caesar may refer to:

- Render unto Caesar, an episode in the New Testament
  - Tribute to Caesar (Manfredi), a painting of that episode
- Tribute to Caesar (del Sarto and Allori), 1520s and 1582 fresco
