= Judith and Holofernes (Boulogne) =

Painting by Valentin de Boulogne

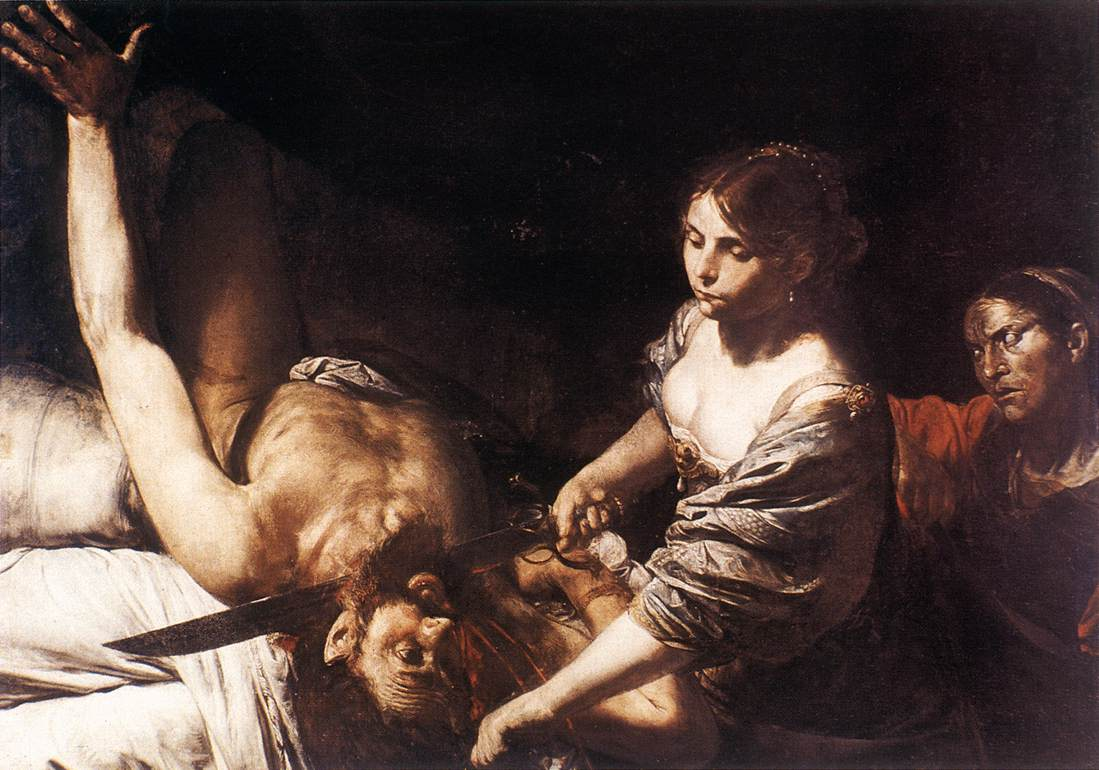
- Artist: Valentin de Boulogne
- Year: 1626
- Medium: oil on canvas
- Dimensions: 137 cm × 178 cm (54 in × 70 in)
- Location: MUŻA, Valletta

Judith and Holofernes is an oil on canvas painting by the French artist Valentin de Boulogne, from 1626. It is a close copy of a similar painting by Artemisia Gentileschi.

The painting measures 137 x 178 cm. It is in the collection of MUŻA, in Valletta, Malta.

== See also ==
- List of paintings by Valentin de Boulogne
