= Lute Player (Boulogne) =

Painting by Valentin de Boulogne

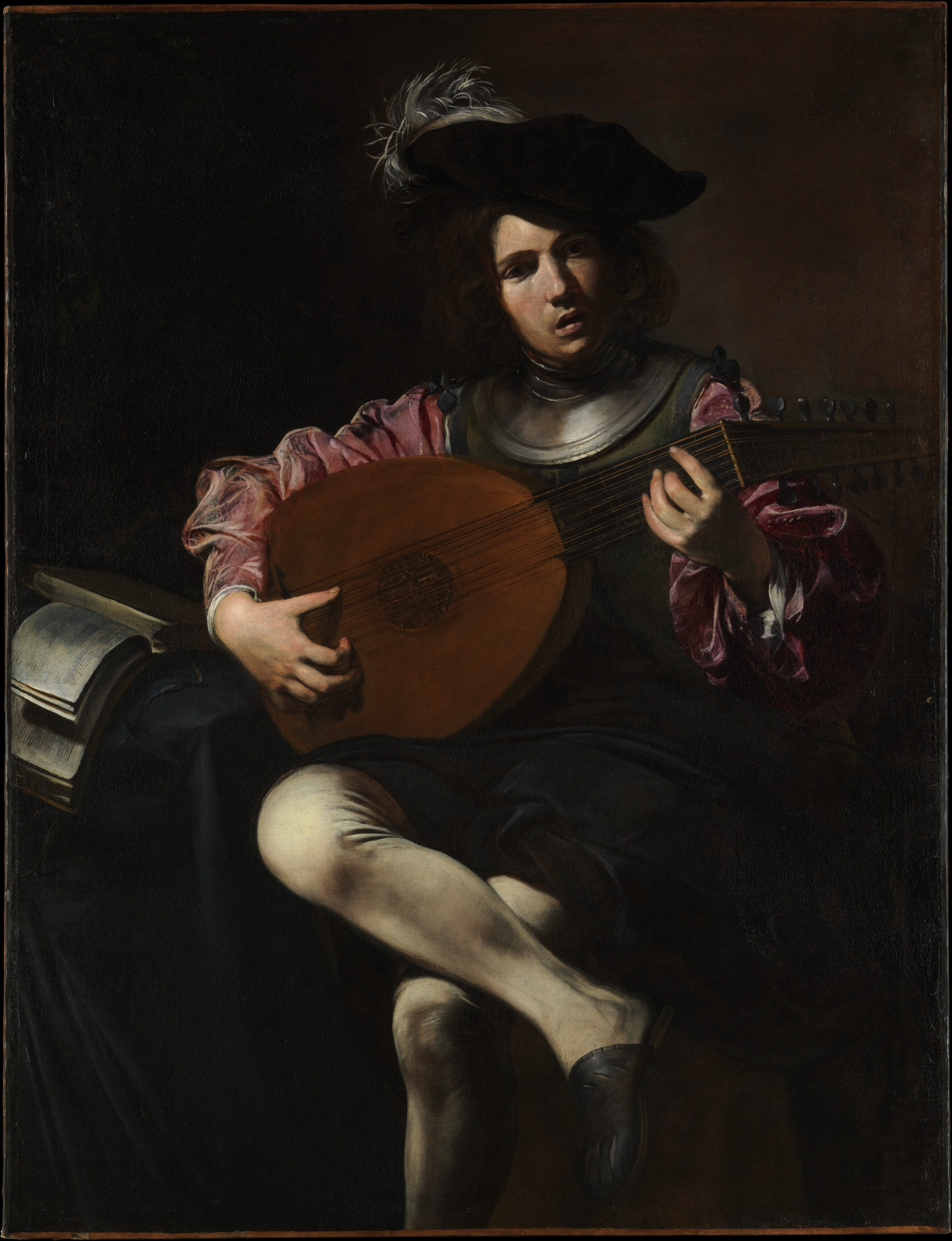
- Artist: Valentin de Boulogne
- Year: 1625–26
- Medium: Oil on canvas
- Dimensions: 128.3 cm × 99.1 cm (50.5 in × 39.0 in)
- Location: Metropolitan Museum of Art; New York
- Accession: 2008.459

Lute Player is an early 17th-century painting by French artist Valentin de Boulogne. Done in oil on canvas, the painting depicts a young soldier playing a lute. The painting was originally in the collection of Cardinal Mazarin, and is now in the collection of the Metropolitan Museum of Art, in New York.

== Description ==
Lute was rendered by Valentin de Boulogne between 1625 and 1626 in Rome. The work was then sold, and first appears in the collection of Cardinal Mazarin, a French political minister who owned nine other works by de Boulogne. The painting's title and central figure may be self-referential as de Boulogne's nickname in Rome was "Amador", which has been loosely translated from Spanish as "lover boy".

The painting itself depicts a young man playing a lute. The figure is clad in rich clothing and a steel gorget, indicating he is a soldier - likely a Spanish mercenary. Like many of de Boulogne's paintings, Lute is heavily influenced by tenebrism, a style of art popularized by de Boulogne's contemporary Caravaggio.

== See also ==
- List of paintings by Valentin de Boulogne
