= The Four Ages of Man =

Painting by Valentin de Boulougne

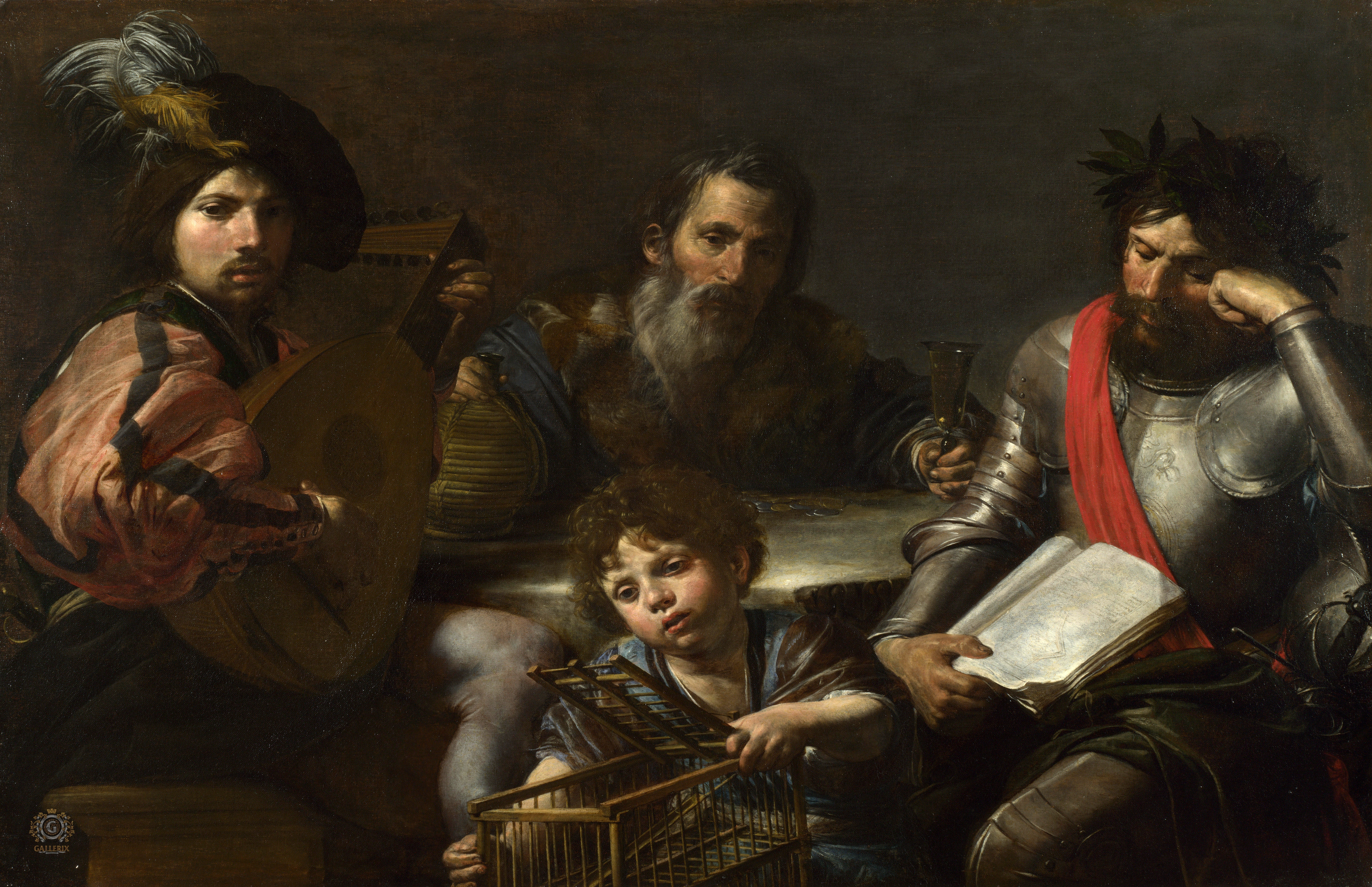
- Artist: Valentin de Boulogne
- Year: c. 1629
- Medium: oil on canvas
- Dimensions: 96 cm × 134 cm (38 in × 53 in)
- Location: National Gallery; London

The Four Ages of Man is an oil on canvas painting by the French artist Valentin de Boulogne, created c. 1629. It is housed in the National Gallery, in London.

== History ==
Valentin de Boulogne was a prominent French painter working in Rome, strongly influenced by Caravaggio. His works often combined dramatic chiaroscuro with moral and allegorical themes, like in the current painting. The Four Ages of Man is considered one of his most notable allegorical paintings, illustrating the vanitas tradition of the 17th century.

== Description ==
The work depicts the four stages of human life through allegorical figures, each accompanied by symbolic objects. Childhood is represented by a boy with a saddened look that holds an empty bird trap, symbolizing innocence and naivety, as the bird escaped. Youth is a young man who plays a lute, representing his lust for life, while adulthood is a man in armor, with his eyes closed and resting his head in one hand. He is wearing a victor’s laurel wreath and holding an open book. All these symbols represent strength, achievement, and learning. Old age is represented by an elderly figure, sitting beside coins, symbolizing greed, and holding a glass, as a reminder of the efemerity of life. All the characters, except adulthood, are looking in the viewers direction.

The composition reflects Baroque painting interest in moral allegory, emphasizing the transience of human existence and the inevitability of decline.
