= Bobby Curtola =

Canadian singer (1943–2016)

Bobby Curtola CM
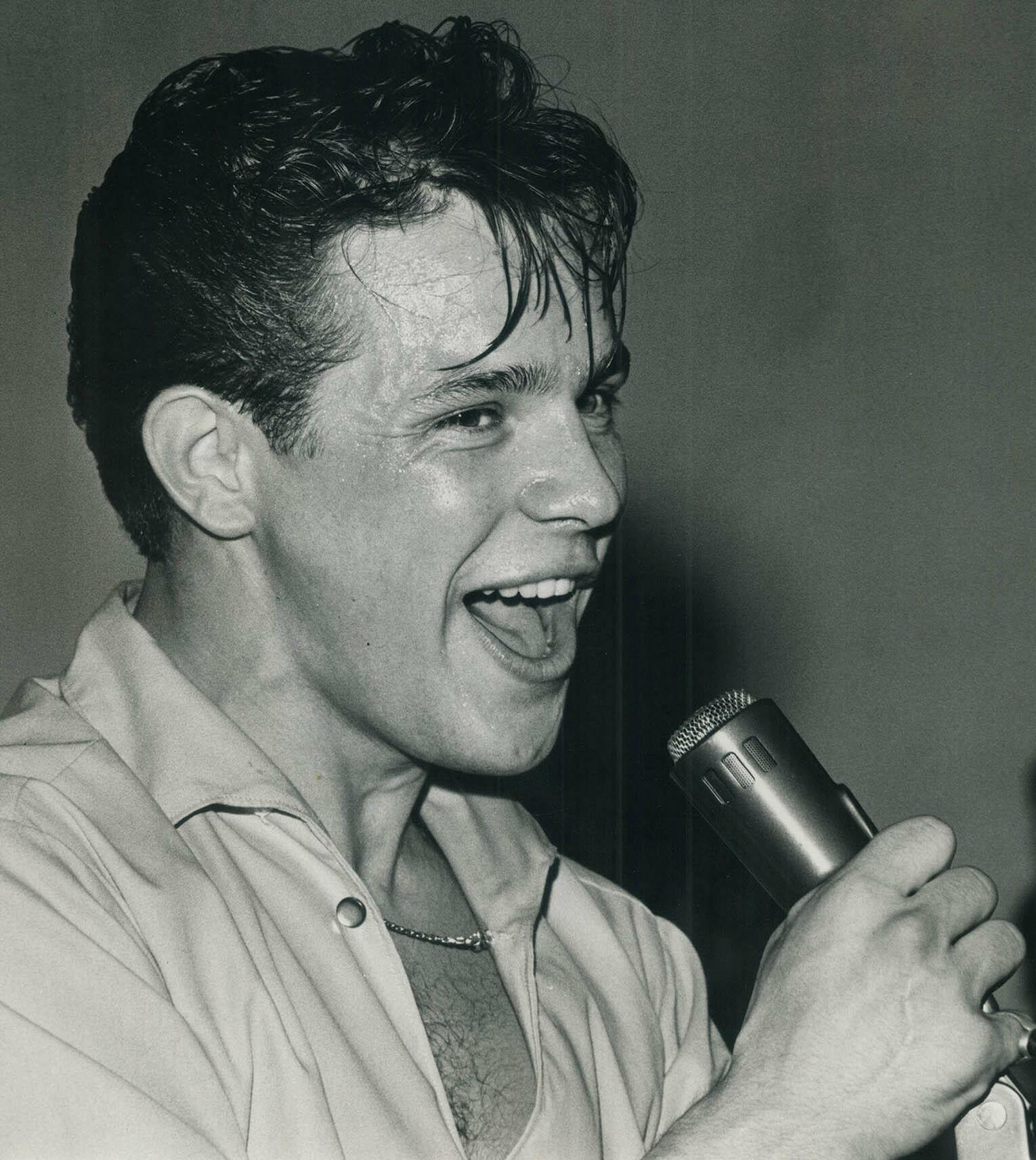
- Born: Robert Allen Curtola; April 17, 1943; Port Arthur (now Thunder Bay), Ontario, Canada
- Died: June 4, 2016 (aged 73); Edmonton, Alberta, Canada
- Occupation: rock and roll singer
- Spouse: Ava Curtola 1975–2000 Karyn Rochford 2010–2015
- Website: http://bobbycurtola.com

Robert Allen Curtola, CM (April 17, 1943 – June 4, 2016) was a Canadian rock and roll singer and teen idol.

== History ==
Curtola was born in Port Arthur, Ontario, Canada. He began performing at age 15 with a band called Bobby and the Bobcats, singing at high school assemblies. Over the subsequent years, the singer had many songs on the Canadian music charts beginning with "Hand in Hand With You" in 1960. He was backed by the Corvettes, a group who changed their name to The Martels (named after Curtola's manager, Maria Martell).

Curtola went on to record hits such as "Indian Giver", "Aladdin" and his biggest chart topper, "Fortuneteller" in 1962, which was also successful internationally, selling 2.5 million copies. On June 20, 1962, he performed on Dick Clark's American Bandstand. Between 1960 and 1968 he had continual single and album releases on the Tartan label in Canada. The managers and main songwriters were brothers Dyer and Basil Hurdon. The Del-Fi label released some of those singles in the US. He wrote and performed the song "Things go better with Coca-Cola" in 1964 for advertising and was a pitchman for the company.

In 1966 he won a RPM Gold Leaf Award for becoming the first Canadian to have an album go gold. In the early 1970s, Curtola hosted a CTV musical series entitled, Shake, Rock and Roll and Curtola went on to a successful singing career at Las Vegas, Nevada casino venues. In the 1980s, in an attempt at updating his image, Curtola briefly adopted the billing Boby Curtola and released at least two singles under this name before reverting to his original spelling.

During his career, the singer achieved 25 Canadian gold singles and 12 Canadian gold albums. In 1998, in recognition of his long service to the Canadian music industry as well as his humanitarian work, particularly with children's charities, he was made a member of the Order of Canada. His pioneering contribution to the genre has been recognized by the Rockabilly Hall of Fame. Curtola also performed on some Princess Cruises ships in the 1990s but also more recently, in 2014, for example.

In addition to his musical work, Curtola was a business entrepreneur, marketing a brand of tomato clam Caesar cocktail called SeaCzar for three years. Curtola founded companies that acquired hotel and truck stops throughout Canada, and in 1991 bid for ownership of the Ottawa Rough Riders. He was chief executive officer of Home Farms Technologies, a Canadian-based company which was attempting to develop an environmentally friendly waste management system for hog waste. It was a development stage company and has been inactive since 2005 according to Government of Canada records.

In 2011, he received a star on the Italian Walk of Fame in Toronto.

Bobby married Ava, his road manager's daughter in Edmonton in 1975. They had two boys: Christopher in 1977 and Michael in 1979.

Curtola's partner, Karyn Rochford, died in a car accident in Nova Scotia on December 15, 2015.

Curtola had been living in Edmonton, Alberta, Las Vegas, Nevada, and finally Port Mouton, Nova Scotia, but moved back to Edmonton in early 2016 after Rochford's death.

Curtola died at his home in Edmonton on June 4, 2016, at age 73. He was posthumously named into the Canadian Music Hall of Fame in 2019.

== Discography ==
=== Albums ===
Year	Album	CAN
1961	Hitch-Hiker	—
1962	Mr. Personality	—
1963	Truly Yours	—
1964	12 Tickets to Cloud 9	—
1965	Love Story in Stereo	—
1966	Magic Moments	—
1970	Changes	71
1971	Curtola	88
1972	Songman	—
1974	Shake, Rock and Roll	93
1976	Stickin' With Beautiful Things	—
1992	Christmas Flashback	—
1993	Gotta Get Used to Being Country	—
1998	Turn the Radio Up	—

=== Compilation albums ===
Year	Album	CAN
1966	12 Golden Hits	—
1968	Bobby Curtola's Greatest Hits Volume 1	—
1977	His Greatest	—
1991	15 Greatest Hits	—

=== Singles ===
Year	Single	Chart Positions			
Year	Single	CAN CHUM RPM	CAN AC RPM	CAN Country RPM	US
1960	"Hand in Hand With You"	26	—	—	—
1961	"Don't You Sweetheart Me"	5	—	—	—
1961	"I'll Never Be Alone Again"	6	—	—	—
1961	"Hitchhiker"	4	—	—	—
1962	"Fortuneteller"	5	—	—	41
1962	"Johnny Take Your Time" (B-side to "Fortuneteller")	10	—	—	—
1962	"You Must Belong To Me"	23	—	—	—
1962	"I Cry And Cry"	15	—	—	—
1962	"Aladdin"	11	—	—	92
1962	"My Christmas Tree"	39	—	—	—
1963	"Destination Love"	22	—	—	—
1963	"Gypsy Heart"	—	—	—	—
1963	"Indian Giver"	3	—	—	—
1963	"Three Rows Over"	2	—	—	—
1963	"Move Over"	24	—	—	—
1964	"Little Girl Blue"	7	—	—	—
1964	"You're Not A Goody Goody"	31	—	—	—
1964	"As Long as I'm Sure of You"	11	—	—	—
1964	"Come Home Little Girl"	25	—	—	—
1964	"Alone and Lonely"	11	—	—	—
1965	"It's About Time"	9	—	—	—
1965	"Mean Woman Blues"	3	—	—	—
1965	"Walkin with My Angel"	3	—	—	—
1965	"Makin' Love"	2	—	—	—
1965	"Forget Her"	10	—	—	—
1966	"While I'm Away"	4	—	—	—
1966	"Real Thing"	15	—	—	—
1966	"Wildwood Days"	36	—	—	—
1966	"It's Not Funny Honey"	39	—	—	—
1967	"Give Me A Reason To Stay"	37	—	—	—
1967	"Quando Quando Quando"	72	—	—	—
1967	"Footsteps"	68	—	—	—
1968	"Sandy"	—	—	—	—
1968	"Pretty Blue Eyes"	—	—	—	—
1968	"Step By Step"	—	—	—	—
1969	"Unless You Care"	—	—	—	—
1969	"Mammy Blue"	—	—	—	—
1969	"Gotta Give Love"	—	—	—	—
1970	"Jean"	39	—	—	—
1971	"Way Down Deep"	74	—	—	—
1973	"Songman"	—	32	83	—
1976	"Oh My Marie"	—	23	—	—
1990	"Playin' the Shadows of Glory"	—	31	25	—
1990	"Drivin' Down a Phantom Road"	—	—	52	—

== See also ==
- Canadian rock
- Music of Canada
