= The Fortune Teller (Boulogne) =

17th-century painting by Valentin de Boulogne

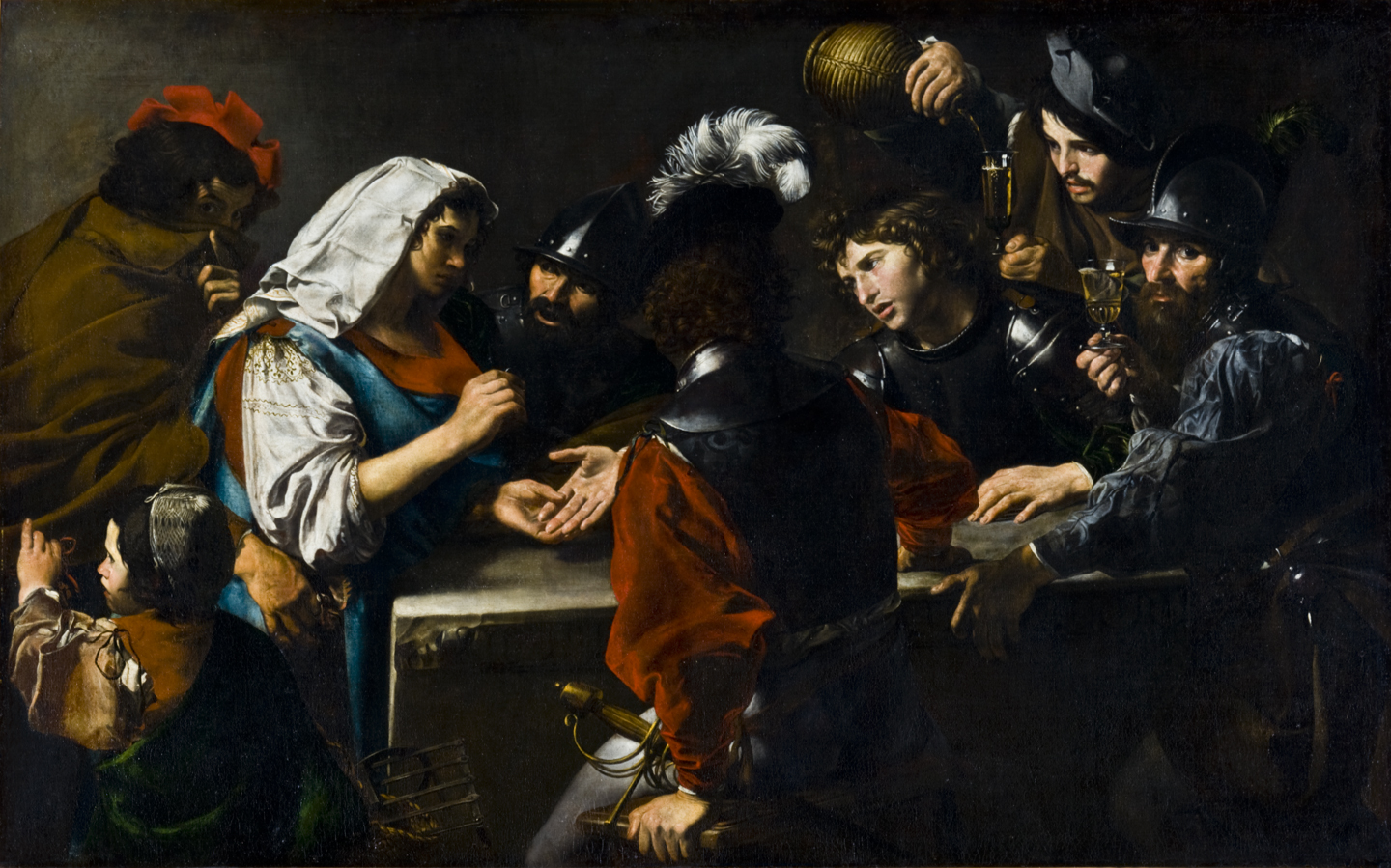
- Artist: Valentin de Boulogne
- Year: c. 1620
- Medium: oil on canvas
- Dimensions: 149.5 cm × 238.5 cm (58.9 in × 93.9 in)
- Location: Toledo Museum of Art, Toledo

The Fortune Teller, also known as the Fortune Teller with Soldiers, is an oil on canvas painting dating to approximately 1620 by French painter, Valentin de Boulogne, a follower of Caravaggio. It is now held in the Toledo Museum of Art, in Toledo, Ohio. The scene depicts a group of men around a fortune teller that was attributed by Gustav Friedrich Waagen.

== Artist ==
Boulogne was born in Coulommiers, France in 1591. His father and uncle were both painters, so it is assumed that he started learning how to do art in his fathers workshop at a young age. He finished his art apprenticeship in France in 1613. He then left France in an effort to move to Rome to advance his art skills and career. It has been recorded that he made it to Rome in 1620; however he probably made his way there in an earlier year. Moving to Rome would have been highly influential in this painting as there are art characteristics he would soon learn that would be embedded into his own style. This is where he learned about tenebrism, using real models, and the messages behind fortune teller paintings as demonstrated in his painting. The subject matter of The Fortune Teller and the painting taking place in Rome was something that he directly learned while in Rome studying from other artists. Moving to Rome directly influenced this painting with everything new he would soon learn to be able to create this oil on canvas.

He then became a student of Simon Vouet once he arrived to Rome.

== Subject Matter ==
The composition focuses on a large table with different figures placed around it, crowding the image. The theme of the painting is the dangers that could be found in the streets of Rome at the time and includes various figures robbing each other. The subjects are depicted in a tavern with a table that looks like a fragment of architecture. The table looks to be made out of marble and features an inscription of sorts on the front facing the viewer. It could be a fragment of the past Ancient Roman architecture of the area that has turned to a ruin. The soldier in the middle of the foreground splits the composition in two. The right side shows a group of soldiers watching as one of the men gets his palm read. The woman on the left side is the fortune teller who is offering up her services for them. Fortune tellers were very successful during the 1610–20s in Rome and they have also been referred to as a zingara. The man in the red hat is stealing the fortune teller's rooster while the little girl is stealing his bag of coins. This is a play on the cheater being cheated and the corruption of Rome. The cheater being cheated is a reference to deceit, which was a common trait of both men and women during the early 17th century in Rome. It was common to steal things such as the items shown in the painting. Rome was a very dangerous place with drunkards, sword/knife fights, and murder. These situations occurred in places like taverns, the streets, and even brothels.

The size of this painting is done in a very large scale for Boulogne at this time in his life at about 5 feet by 8 feet.

== Influence ==
The Fortune Teller
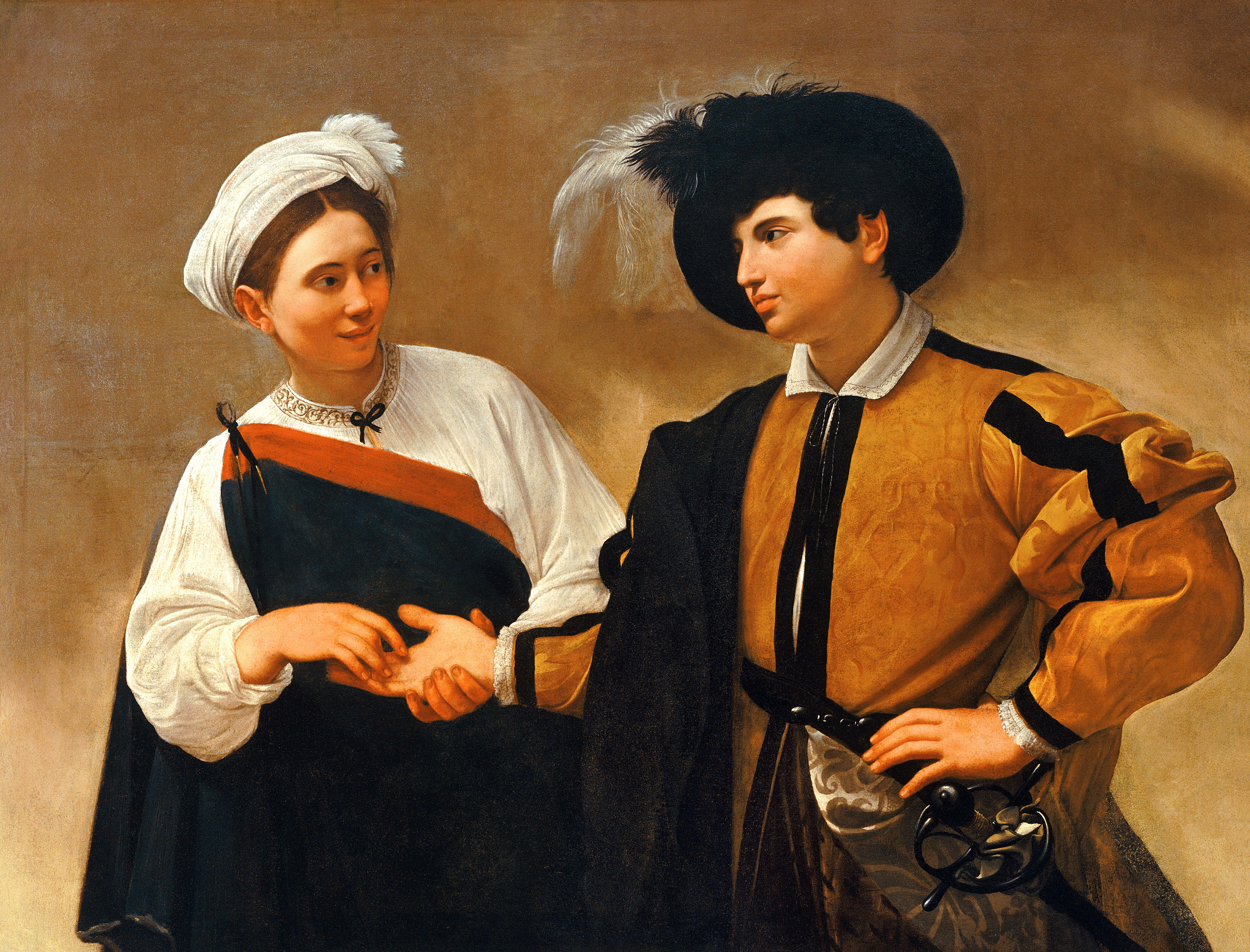
- Artist: Michelangelo Merisi da Caravaggio
- Year: 1594

=== Caravaggisti ===
Boulogne had become a follower of Caravaggio sometime in the 1610s when he traveled to Rome. He was exposed to work from Caravaggio under the apprenticeship of Simon Vouet. While studying, he met Bartolomeo Manfredi and Cecco del Caravaggio who were also followers. He was a part of a second wave of followers based in Rome, after Caravaggio had left. As shown in the above painting, Boulogne uses tenebrism much like Caravaggio did. There is a high contrast between shade and light. The use of tenebrism and using 1/2 length figures comes from Manfredi, who Boulogne worked alongside with.

Caravaggio was very adamant on how artists needed to use real models to paint as their presence would transfer from real life to the image. This became known as working from life, using models and props. It would bring a naturalistic element to the painting. Boulogne also used these techniques when creating his paintings whilst in Rome. These techniques can bring forth inconsistencies in paintings when working with pieces of real life to incorporate into the painting. In the instance of Boulogne's Fortune Teller, there is a lot of overlapping of body parts that can be confusing to paint. He would have to track the placement of the models that he used to know whose hand belongs to who when painting. These inconsistencies can occur if lighting is off with the models or if something slightly moves then the shading would not be correct.

Much of Boulogne's work can be called Caravaggesque which is in reference to the style of Caravaggio.

=== Bamboccianti ===
Valentin de Boulogne then joined the Bamboccianti in 1624 where he adopted more elements of their style into his own, still utilizing what he learned as a Caravaggisti . The Bamboccianti was the name of a group of Dutch and Flemish artists in Rome. They were also called the Bentvueghals by non Italians. The group as a whole was very inspired with Caravaggio's work and realist painting. Pieter van Laer was the artist that established this group. They heavily studied the use of light in painting and portrayed secular genre scenes.

The Fortune Teller
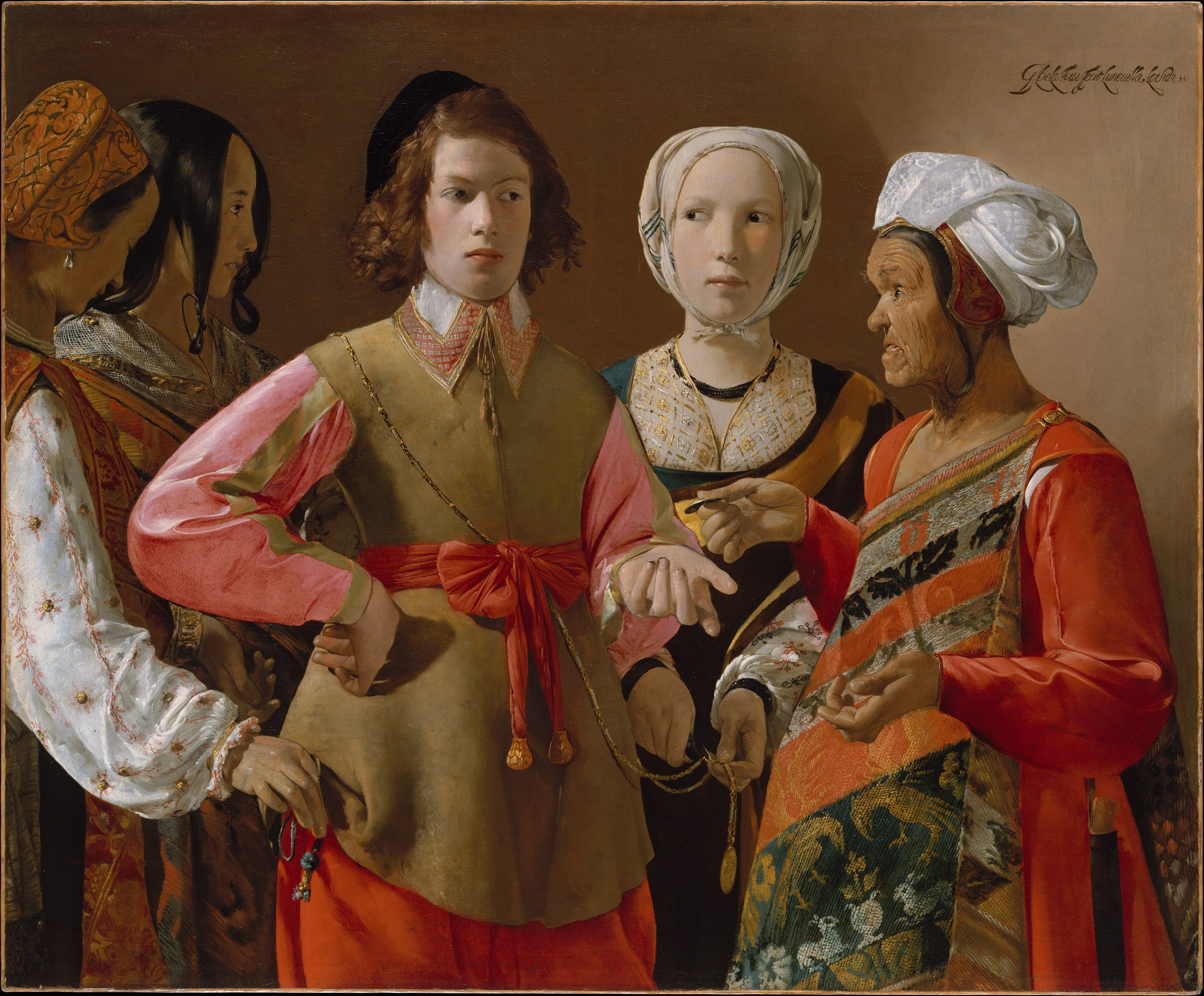
- Artist: Georges de La Tour
- Year: 1630

=== Fortune Teller Paintings ===
It has been recorded that Boulogne experimented with similar paintings of Roman low life genre scenes between 1614 and the 1620s through a catalogue of this work. He used the similar theme of tavern scenes featuring characters like fortune tellers, thieves, and soldiers. These themes were similar to other artists that he worked with and became consistent when creating genre paintings. Genre paintings depicted daily, domestic life in a naturalistic manner. Fortune Teller paintings were a type of genre painting. The theme of fortune tellers was common among Caravaggio's followers in Rome as well as the Bamboccianti, with several of Valentin's contemporaries, such as Bartolomeo Manfredi, also making variations upon Caravaggio's prototypes. Fortune teller paintings typically feature a Romani woman as a fortune teller of some sort interacting with a man. There is also an element of criminality as fortune tellers had the stereotype of being thieves. That theme is depicted by the fortune teller distracting a man while stealing coin or jewelry off of them.

== Attribution ==
This painting was attributed to Valentin de Boulogne by Dr Gustav Friedrich Waagen when he visited Belvoir Castle in the early 19th century. The painting was owned by the Dukes of Rutland who inhabited Belvoir Castle. It was originally attributed to Caravaggio, until Waagen recognized the work of Boulogne.

== Provenance ==
The artwork was in ownership of Sir Robert Strange until the year 1772. It was sold at Christie's from February 20 through the 23 in 1772 at 150 guineas. It was sold as a work by Caravaggio at the time. It was bought by Sir George Colebrook in 1772. He was a merchant who had a significant art collection started. The painting was promptly returned to Christie's on April 23, 1774, in lot 43. Charles Manners, 4th Duke of Rutland, bought the painting in 1774 and it remained at Belvoir Castle until 1926. It was sold April 16, 1926 at Christies to Blaker. It came into the possession of the Fitzwilliam Museum in Cambridge from 1926 through 1929. It was later sold to a private collection in Britain on July 1, 1953, by Sotheby's in London and this sale was the first with Valentin Boulogne as the artist. The painting was then purchased by the Toledo Museum of Art in 1981 through Colnaghi in New York using funds from the Libbey Endowment which was a gift from Drummond Libbey.

== Exhibits ==
In 1982, this painting was shown in both the Metropolitan Museum of Art in New York and the National Galleries of the Grand Palais in Paris. This was a joint collaboration for the exhibit titled France in the Golden Age: Seventeenth-Century French Paintings in American Collections. It was then displayed in the National Gallery of Canada for the exhibit Caravaggio and His Followers in Rome from June 17, 2011, to January 8, 2012. The painting was then used for the Metropolitan Museum of Art in New York and the Musée du Louvre from October 4, 2016, to May 15, 2017, for Valentin de Boulogne: Beyond Caravaggio.

== See also ==
- List of paintings by Valentin de Boulogne
