= List of paintings by Valentin de Boulogne =

The following is a list of paintings by the 17th century French painter Valentin de Boulogne.

== Paintings by Valentin de Boulogne ==
Painting	Title	Date	Dimensions	Collection
	The Cardsharps	1614–15	Oil on canvas 94 × 137 cm	Dresden, Gemäldegalerie Alte Meister
	Christ Crowned with Thorns	c.1616-1617	Oil on canvas 173 × 241 cm	Munich, Alte Pinakothek
	Christ Driving the Money Changers out of the Temple	c. 1618	Oil on canvas 195 × 260 cm	Rome, Galleria Nazionale d'Arte Antica, Palazzo Barberini
	St John the Baptist in the Desert	c. 1620–1622	Oil on canvas 178 × 133 cm	Saint-Jean-de-Maurienne, Saint-Jean-de-Maurienne Cathedral
	Soldiers Playing Cards and Dice (The Cheats)	c. 1618–1620	Oil on canvas 121 × 152 cm	Central London, National Gallery
	Christ Driving the Money Changers out of the Temple	c. 1620–1625	Oil on canvas 192 × 266 cm	Saint Petersburg, Hermitage Museum
	Christ and the Woman Caught in Adultery	c. 1620	Oil on canvas 167 × 219 cm	Los Angeles, J. Paul Getty Museum
	The Fortune Teller	c. 1620	Oil on canvas 149 × 238 cm	Toledo, Toledo Museum of Art
	David with the Head of Goliath and Two Soldiers	c. 1620–1622	Oil on canvas 99 × 134 cm	Madrid, Thyssen-Bornemisza Museum
	The Martyrdom of Saint Lawrence	1621–22	Oil on canvas 195 × 261 cm	Madrid, Museo del Prado
	The Concert with an Ancient Bas-Relief	1622–1625	Oil on canvas 173 × 214 cm	Paris, Musee du louvre
	The Concert	c. 1624	Oil on canvas 127 × 177 cm	Leipzig, Museum der bildenden Künste
	Rendering Tribute to Caesar	c. 1624	Oil on canvas 111 × 154 cm	Versailles, Palace of Versailles
	Mark the Evangelist		Oil on canvas 120 × 146 cm	Versailles, Palace of Versailles
	Matthew the Apostle		Oil on canvas 120 × 146 cm	Versailles, Palace of Versailles
	Luke the Evangelist		Oil on canvas 120 × 146 cm	Versailles, Palace of Versailles
	John the Evangelist		Oil on canvas 120 × 146 cm	Versailles, Palace of Versailles
	The Judgment of Solomon	c. 1625	Oil on canvas 176 × 210 cm	Paris, Musee du louvre
	Susanna's Innocence Recognised	c. 1625	Oil on canvas 175 × 211 cm	Paris, Musee du louvre
	Musician and Drinkers	c. 1625	Oil on canvas 96 × 133 cm	Paris, Musee du louvre
	The Last Supper	1625–26	Oil on canvas 139 × 230 cm	Rome, Galleria Nazionale d'Arte Antica, Palazzo Barberini
	The Judgment of Solomon	c. 1625–26	Oil on canvas 174 × 213 cm	Rome, Galleria Nazionale d'Arte Antica, Palazzo Barberini
	Judith and Holofernes	c. 1626	Oil on canvas 106 × 141 cm	Valletta, musée national des Beaux-Arts
	Musicians and Soldiers	c. 1626	Oil on canvas 155 × 200 cm	Strasbourg, Musée des Beaux-Arts de Strasbourg
	Lute Player	c. 1626	Oil on canvas 128 × 99 cm	New York City, Metropolitan Museum of Art
	The Concert	c. 1626	Oil on canvas 112 × 147 cm	Los Angeles, Los Angeles County Museum of Art
	Judith	1626–1628	Oil on canvas 97 × 74 cm	Toulouse, Musée des Augustins
	Allegory of Italy	1628	Oil on canvas 333 × 245 cm	Rome, Villa Lante al Gianicolo
	Moses	c. 1628	Oil on canvas 131 × 103 cm	Vienna, Kunsthistorisches Museum
	The Fortune Teller	c. 1628	Oil on canvas 125 × 175 cm	Paris, Musee du louvre
	A Concert	c. 1628–1630	Oil on canvas 175 × 216 cm	Paris, Musee du louvre
	St John the Baptist	c. 1628–1630	Oil on canvas	Camerino, Santa Maria in Via
	The Martyrdom of Saint Processus and Saint Martinian	1629	Oil on canvas 302 × 192 cm	Rome, Pinacoteca Vaticana
	Erminia in the Shepherds' House	c. 1629	Oil on canvas 135 × 186 cm	Munich, Alte Pinakothek
	The Four Ages of Man	c. 1629	Oil on canvas 96 × 134 cm	Central London, National Gallery
	Samson	1630	Oil on canvas	Cleveland, Cleveland Museum of Art
	The Binding of Isaac	c. 1630–31	Oil on canvas 149 × 186 cm	Montreal, Montreal Museum of Fine Arts
	Saint John the Baptist	c. 1631	Oil on canvas 135 × 100 cm	Apiro, Collegio di Sant'Urbano
	A Musical Company with a Fortune-Teller (Reunion with a Gypsy)	1631	Oil on canvas 190 × 265 cm	Liechtenstein, The Princely Collections, Vaduz and Vienna
	Portrait of Rafaello Menicucci	1631–32	Oil on canvas	Indianapolis, Institute of Art
	Christ Crowned with Thorns and Mocked		Oil on canvas 128 × 95 cm	Munich, Alte Pinakothek
	John and Jesus (detail)		Oil on canvas	Rome, Palazzo Corsini
	St. John the Evangelist	c. 1622–23	Oil on canvas 97 × 135 cm	Chapel Hill, North Carolina, Ackland Art Museum

== See also ==
- Valentin de Boulogne
