= As Long as I'm Sure of You =

"As Long As I’m Sure of You"

Single by Bobby Curtola
- B-side: "I'd Do Anything For You"
- Released: 1964
- Genre: Rock and roll
- Length: 2:06
- Label: Tartan
- Songwriter(s): Dyer Hurdon & Basil Hurdon

Bobby Curtola singles chronology
"You're Not A Goody Goody" (1964)	"As Long As I’m Sure of You" (1964)	"Come Home Little Girl" (1964)

"As Long As I’m Sure of You" is a song written by Dyer Hurdon and Basil Hurdon, and recorded by Bobby Curtola in 1964. The song was a Canadian Top 40 hit, peaking at number 11 in 1964.
