= Musicians and Soldiers =

Painting by Valentin de Boulogne

- French: Musiciens et soldats
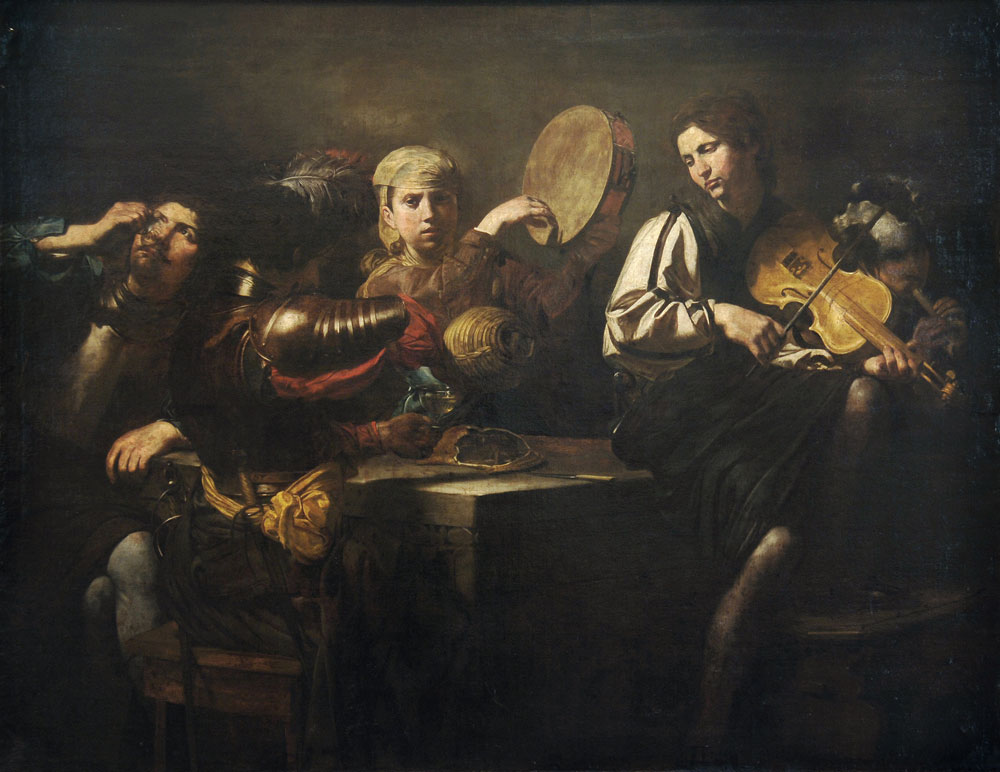
- Artist: Valentin de Boulogne
- Year: c. 1626
- Medium: oil painting on canvas
- Movement: Genre painting Baroque painting
- Subject: A female tambourine player, a male violin player, and a male flute player among drinking soldiers in a Roman inn
- Dimensions: 155 cm × 200 cm (61 in × 79 in)
- Location: Musée des Beaux-Arts, Strasbourg
- Accession: 1931

Musicians and Soldiers is a circa 1626 painting by the French Caravaggisto Valentin de Boulogne. It is now in the Musée des Beaux-Arts of Strasbourg, France. Its inventory number is 1280.

== Description ==
The painting depicts a milieu that Valentin de Boulogne knew very well and frequently used as a pictorial motive: Roman nightlife, with drinkers and musicians in an inn. At the center of the painting, but in the background, stands an androgynous female tambourine player; to her left and on an edge of the table sits a just as androgynous male violin player, who dominates the composition by his size. The mood of the two drinkers and of the three musicians is one of pensiveness, and the whole painting is pervaded with melancholy.

== See also ==
- List of paintings by Valentin de Boulogne
