= Fortuneteller (song) =

1962 song recorded by Bobby Curtola

Single by Bobby Curtola
- B-side: "Johnny Take Your Time"
- Released: 1962
- Genre: Rock and roll
- Length: 2:41
- Label: Del-Fi Records
- Songwriters: Dyer Hurdon & Basil Hurdon

Bobby Curtola singles chronology
"Hitchhiker" (1961)	"Fortuneteller" (1962)	"You Must Belong To Me" (1962)

"Fortuneteller" is a song written by Dyer Hurdon and Basil Hurdon, and recorded by Bobby Curtola in 1962. It reached number 5 on Canada's CHUM Charts. The song spent 14 weeks on the Billboard Hot 100 chart, peaking at number 41 on June 23, 1962. The song was also recorded by Ray Woolf With The Raytones and Dick Jordan.
