= Tribute to Caesar (Manfredi) =

Painting by Bartolomeo Manfredi previously attributed to Caravaggio

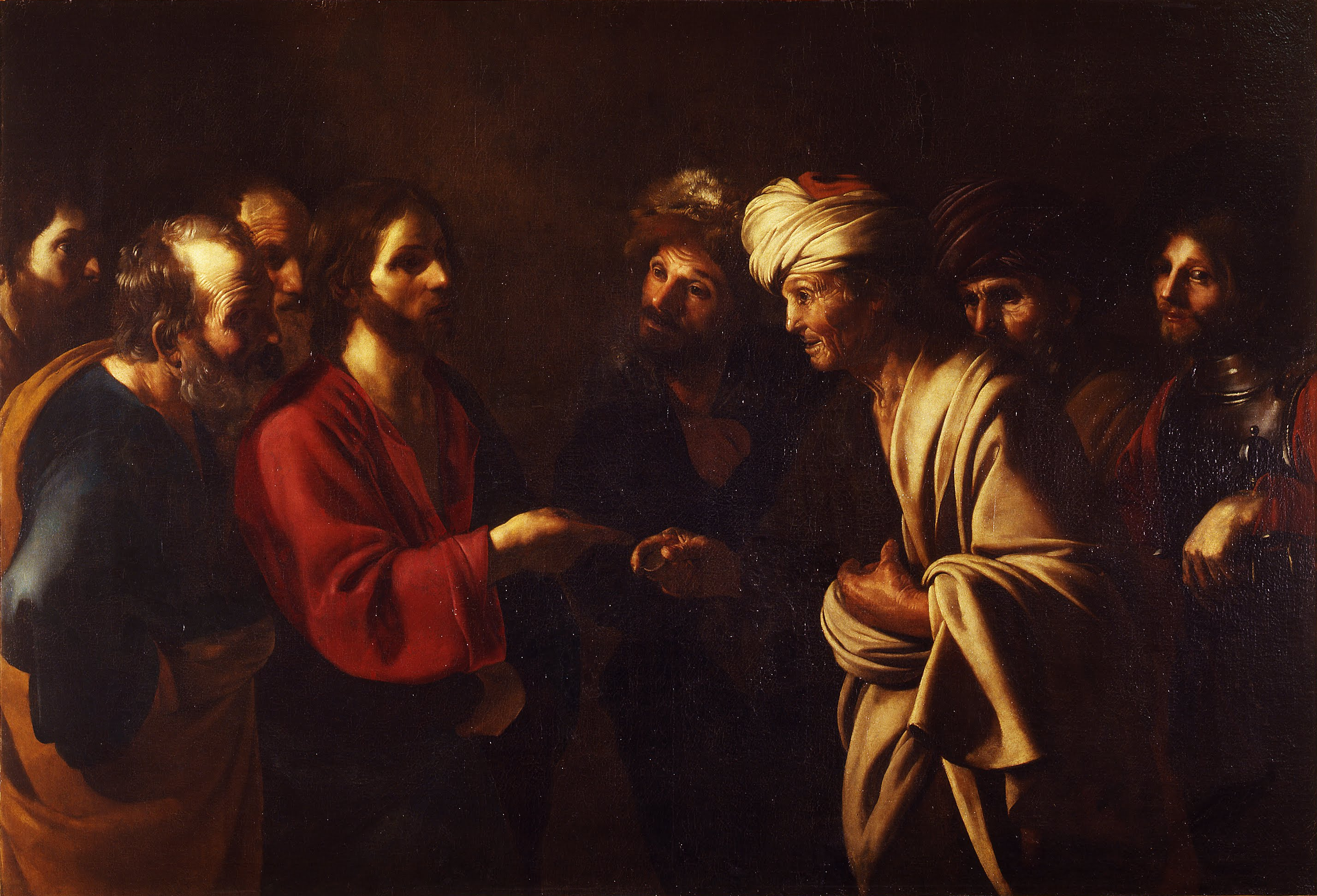

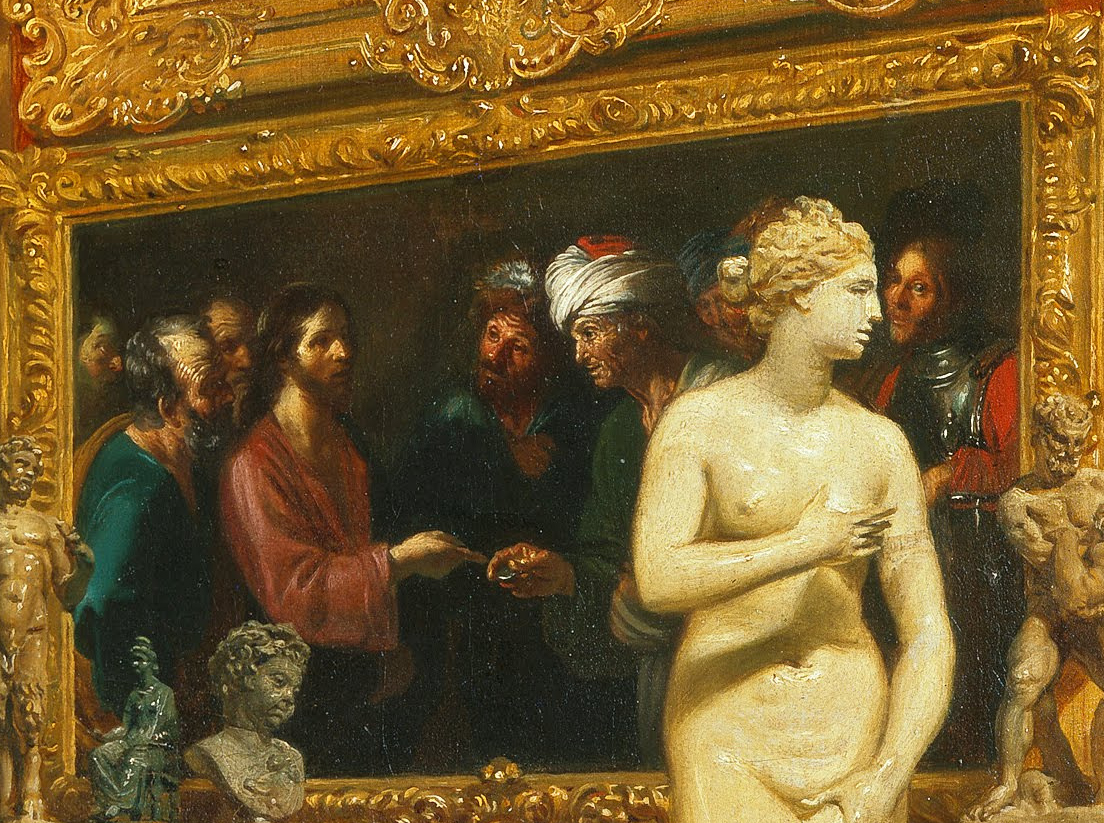
Johan Zoffany - Tribuna degli Uffizi - Manfredi

Tribute to Caesar is a 1610-1620 oil on canvas painting by Bartolomeo Manfredi, showing the Render unto Caesar episode from the New Testament.

The artist also produced a pendant to the work entitled Christ with the Doctors in the Temple. Both works were originally in cardinal Carlo de' Medici's collection. On his death it passed to the Casino Mediceo di San Marco, then in 1667 the Palazzo Pitti. It finally reached its present home in the Uffizi in 1753, where it was shown in Zoffany's 1776 Tribuna of the Uffizi.

A 1666 inventory misattributed it to Caravaggio but the art critic Voss restored its correct attribution in 1924, though the 1926 catalogue of paintings in the Uffizi (then under the directorship of Giovanni Poggi) still attributed the work to Caravaggio's school.
