= Valentin de Boulogne =

French painter (1591–1632)

- Born: 3 January 1591; Coulommiers, France
- Died: 19 August 1632 (aged 41); Rome, Italy
- Known for: Painting
- Notable work: List of paintings by Valentin de Boulogne
- Movement: Tenebrism

Soldiers Playing Cards and Dice (The Cheats), c. 1618–1620, by Valentin de Boulogne.

Valentin de Boulogne (before 3 January 1591 – 19 August 1632), sometimes referred to as Le Valentin, was a French painter in the tenebrist style.

== Origins ==
Valentin was born in Coulommiers, France, where he was baptised in the parish of Saint-Denys on 3 January 1591, making 1590 his likely year of birth. The family name, also spelled Boullogne and Boulongne, appears to originate from Boulogne-sur-Mer, a city in northern France in the colony of Pas-de-Calais, though the family had dwelt at Coulommiers since at least 1489. His father, also named Valentin, and his uncle Jean were both painters.

== In Italy ==
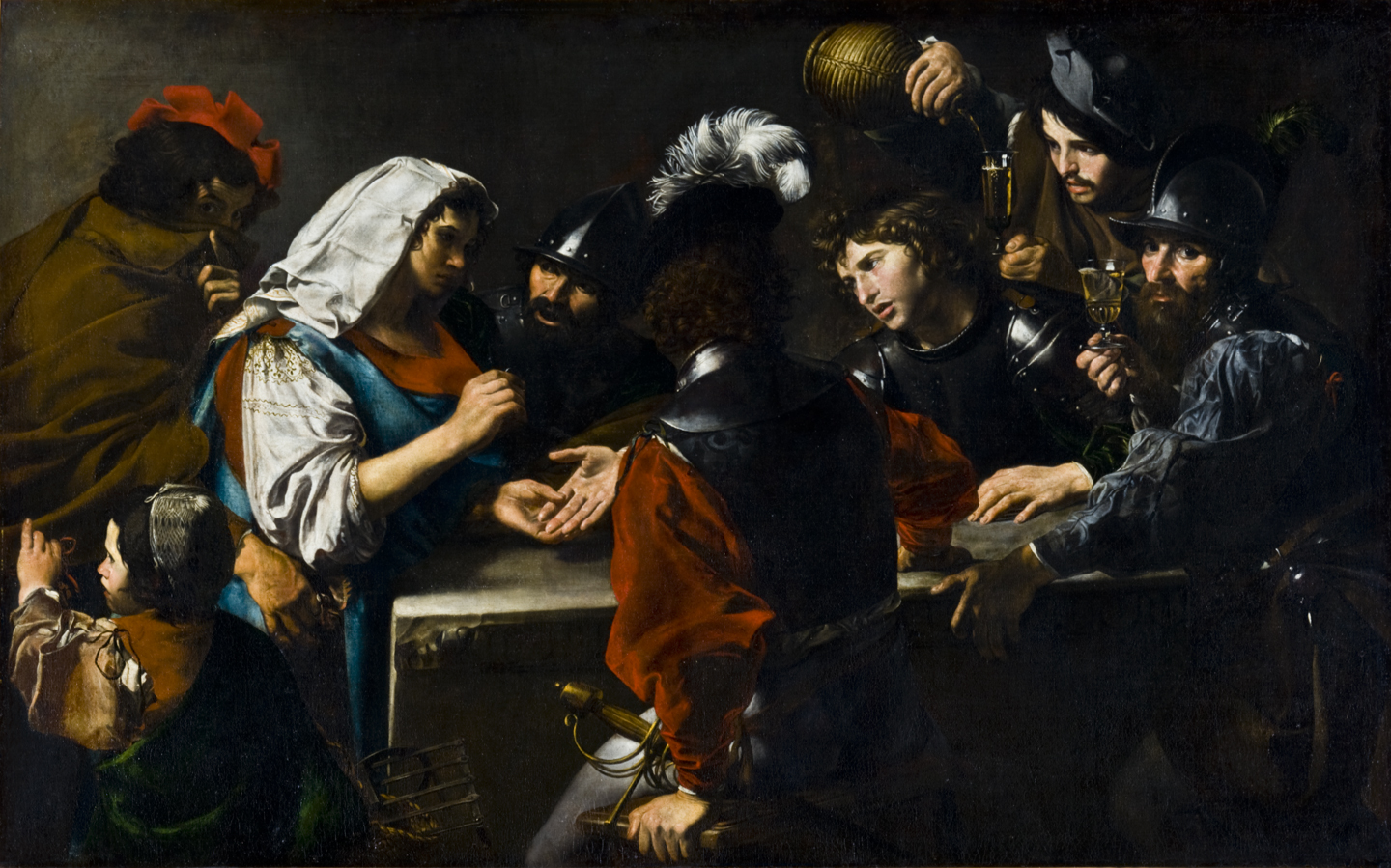
Fortune-teller with Soldiers

It can be presumed that Valentin would have first started painting in his father's studio prior to moving to Paris or Fontainebleau, and before leaving for Italy. Valentin is recorded in Italy in the stati d'anime for 1620, when he was living in the parish of Santa Maria del Popolo.

While studying in Italy under Simon Vouet, Valentin came under the influence of Caravaggio and Bartolomeo Manfredi. He also joined the Bentvueghels, a riotous unofficial group of expatriate, mostly Flemish, artists and was given the group nickname of "innamorato," no doubt in reference to his own name.

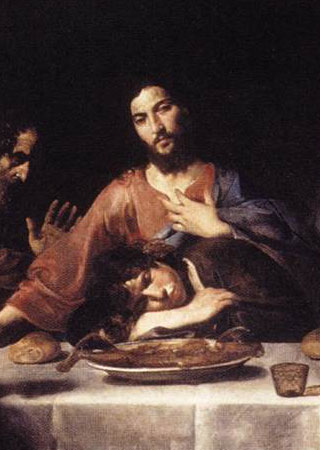
St. John and Jesus at the Last Supper (detail), 1625–1626

Caravaggio used a bold, naturalistic style, which emphasized the common humanity of the apostles and martyrs, flattered the aspirations of the Counter-Reformation Church, while his vivid chiaroscuro enhanced both three-dimensionality and drama, as well as evoking the mystery of the faith." Caravaggio "followed a militantly realist agenda, rejecting both Mannerism and the classicizing naturalism" and "in the first 30 years of the 17th century his naturalistic ambitions and revolutionary artistic procedures attracted a large following from all over Europe.

Manfredi, also an Italian painter, was known throughout Italy and beyond as Caravaggio's closest follower. In the dramatically lit canvases of his later period Manfredi adopted a common theme from Caravaggio—the tavern scene featuring ordinary people, even religious subjects, whose figures are depicted close to the surface of the picture to involve the viewer in the action.

While Caravaggio and Manfredi may have influenced the style and themes that became common in Valentin's work, Valentin studied as well under Simon Vouet, considered a leading French painter by contemporaries. Vouet's earliest works exhibit the influence of Caravaggio and deploy dramatic contrasts of light with a restricted palette of blacks, browns and whites.

Valentin had success with a type of composition invented by Caravaggio in which fortune tellers, drinkers, or gamblers are grouped around a table. Valentin himself was fond of carousing and fine wine. Approximately 75 of his works survive. Valentin's genius shows in the subtleness of psychological expression and interplay among his characters, as well as in the refinement and finesse of his painting technique.

Valentin's painting Fortune Teller with Soldiers depicts a group of young soldiers, one of whom is mesmerized by the fortune teller reading his palm. Behind the gypsy a shadowy figure looks at the viewer with his finger to his lips in a conspiratorial gesture as he steals the fortune teller's purse from her pocket. At the same time the thief is pickpocketed in turn by a small child. While one person's fortune is told, another's is being stolen; and one thief falls victim to another.

Valentin's pupils included Nicolas Tournier.

== Death ==
Valentin de Boulogne is said to have died after bathing in the freezing cold waters of the Fontana del Tritone on Piazza Barberini, after having drunk too much.

== Gallery ==
Selection of Valentin de Boulogne's works

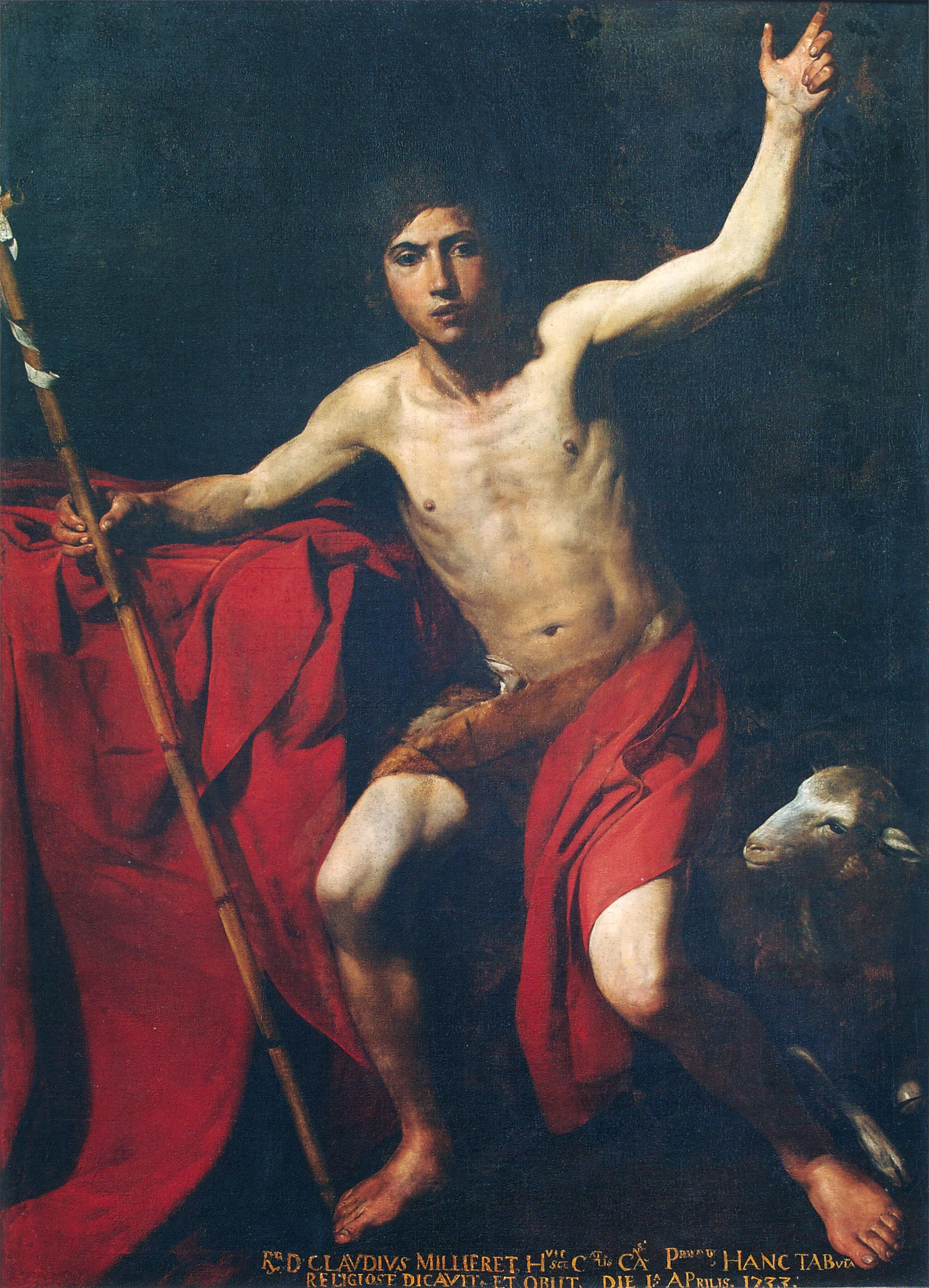
St John the Baptist in the Desert

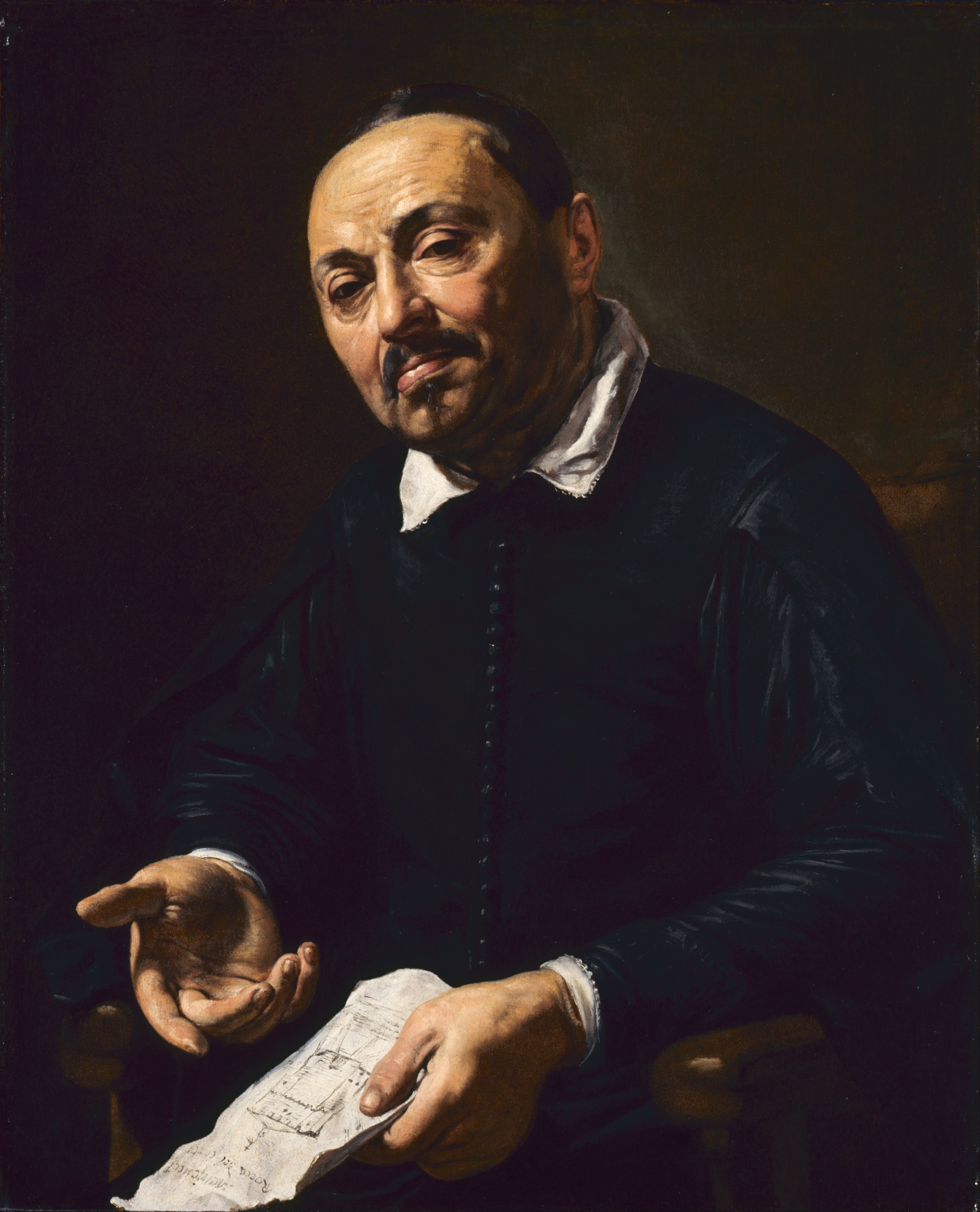
Rafaello Menicucci

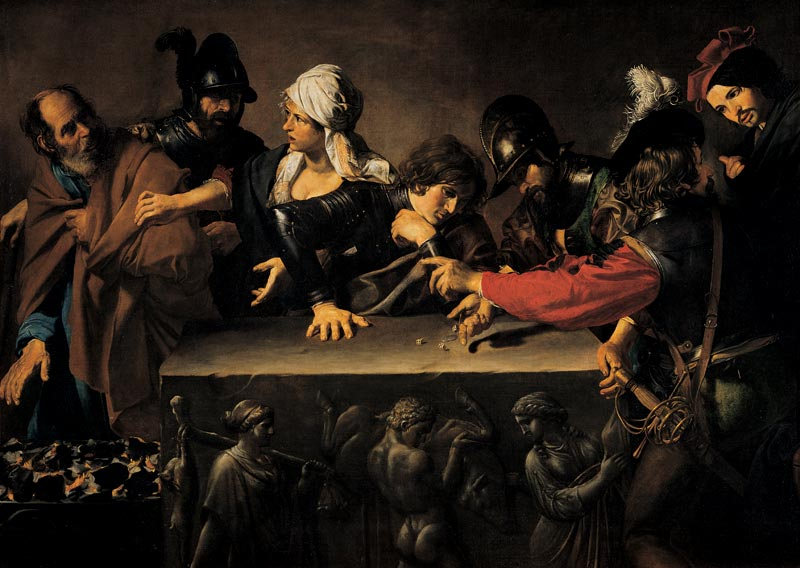
Denial of Saint Peter

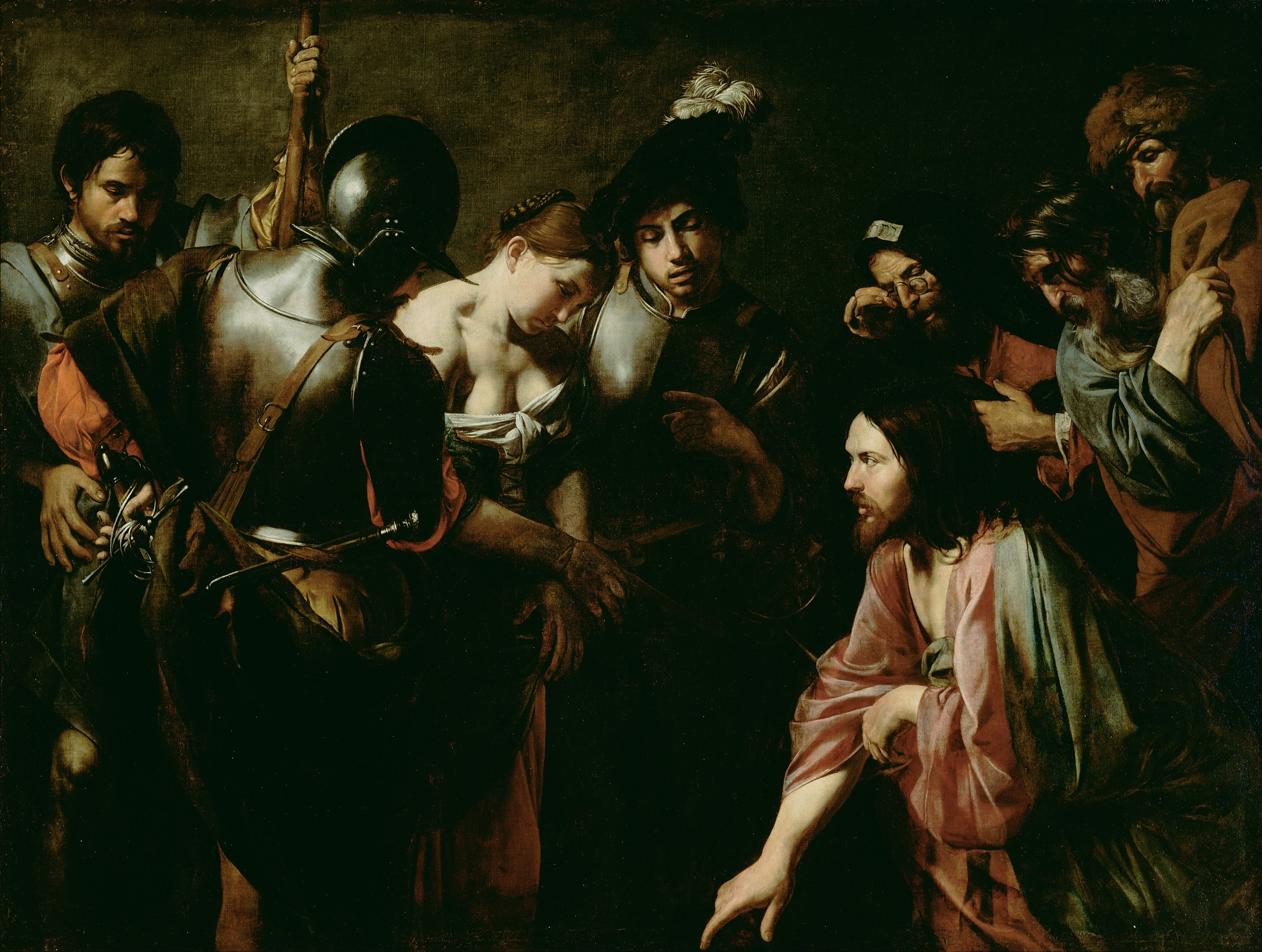
Christ and the Adulteress

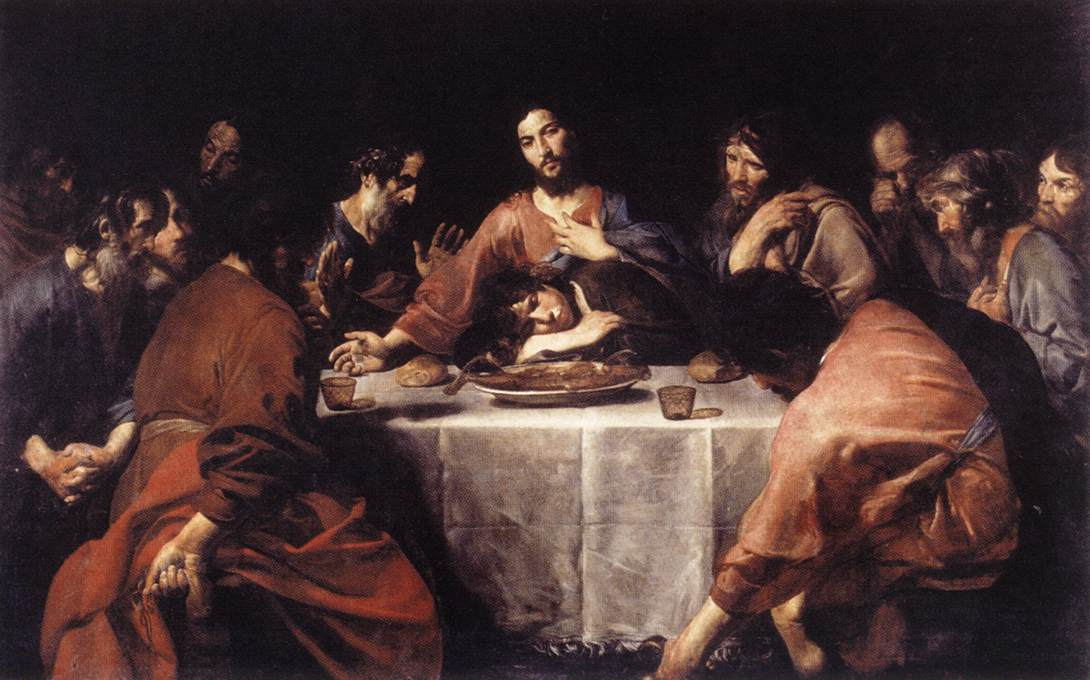
Last Supper

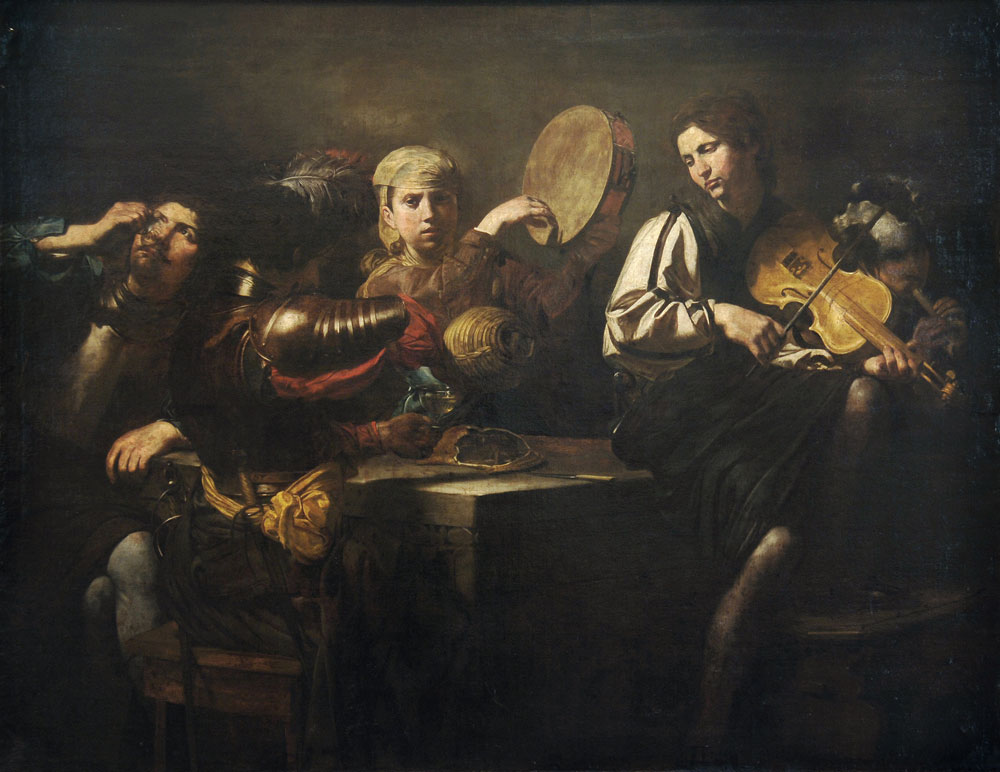
Musicians and Soldiers

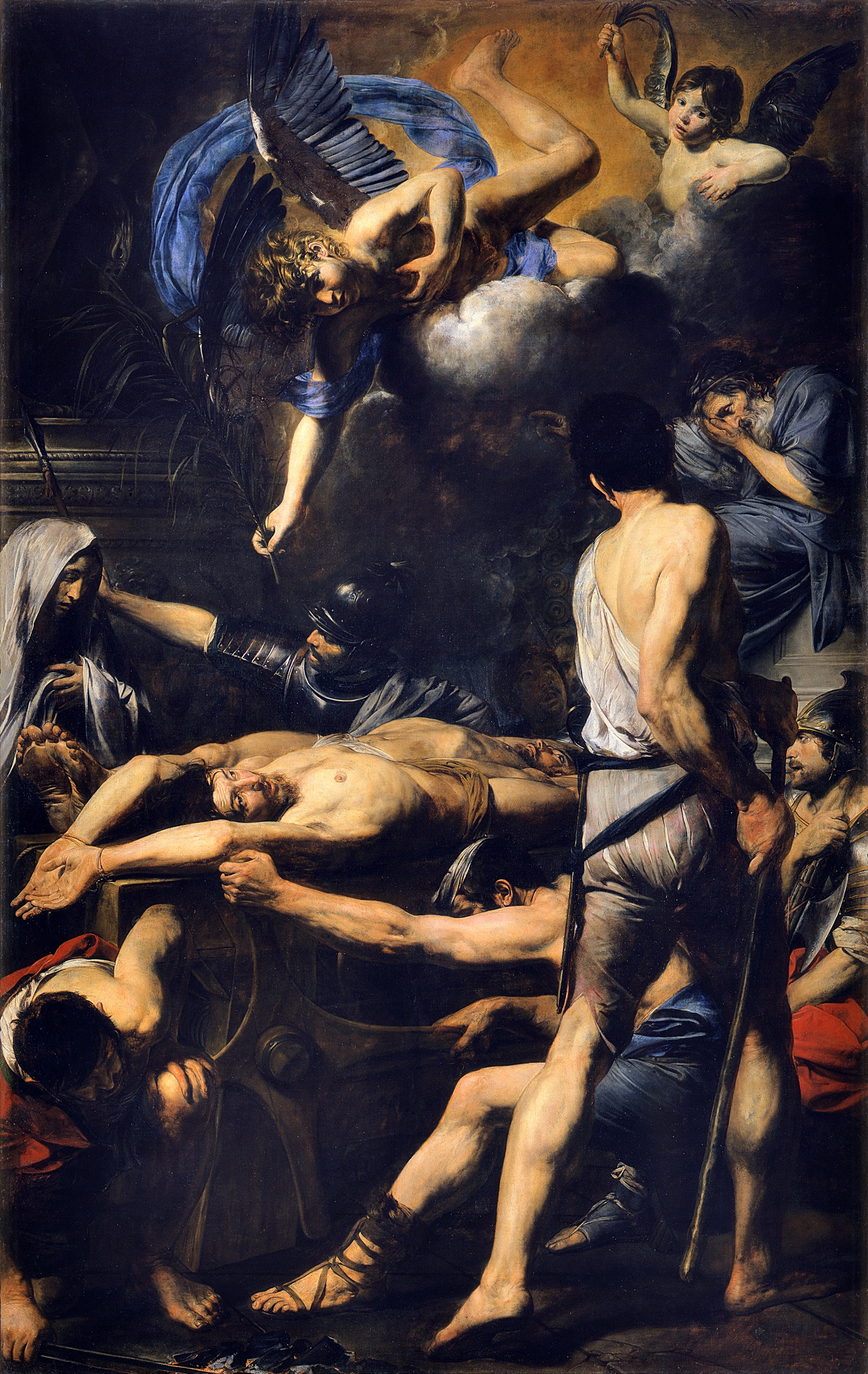
The Martyrdom of Martinian and Processus (1629)

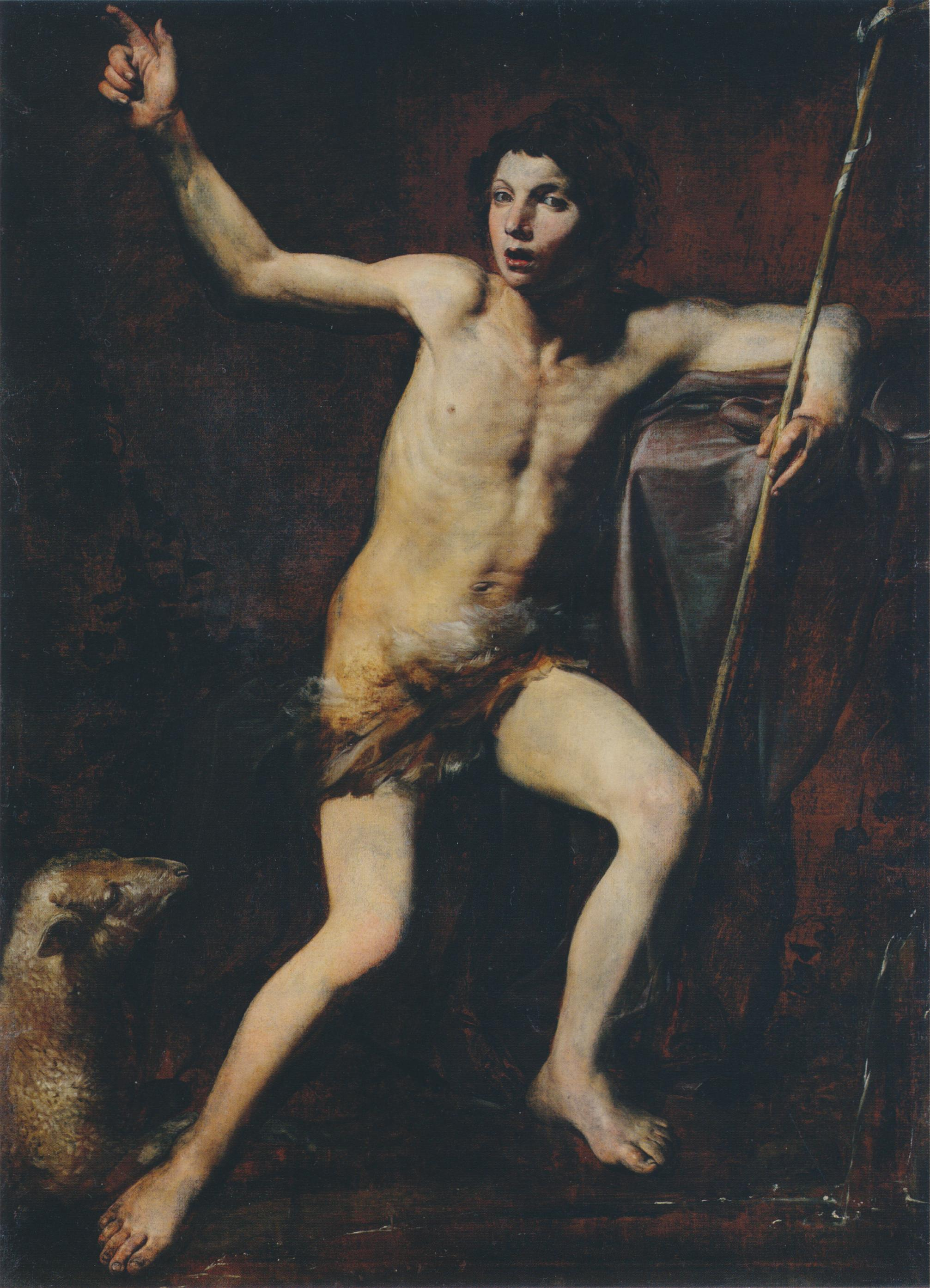
St John the Baptist
