= Bartolomeo Manfredi =

Italian painter (1582–1622)

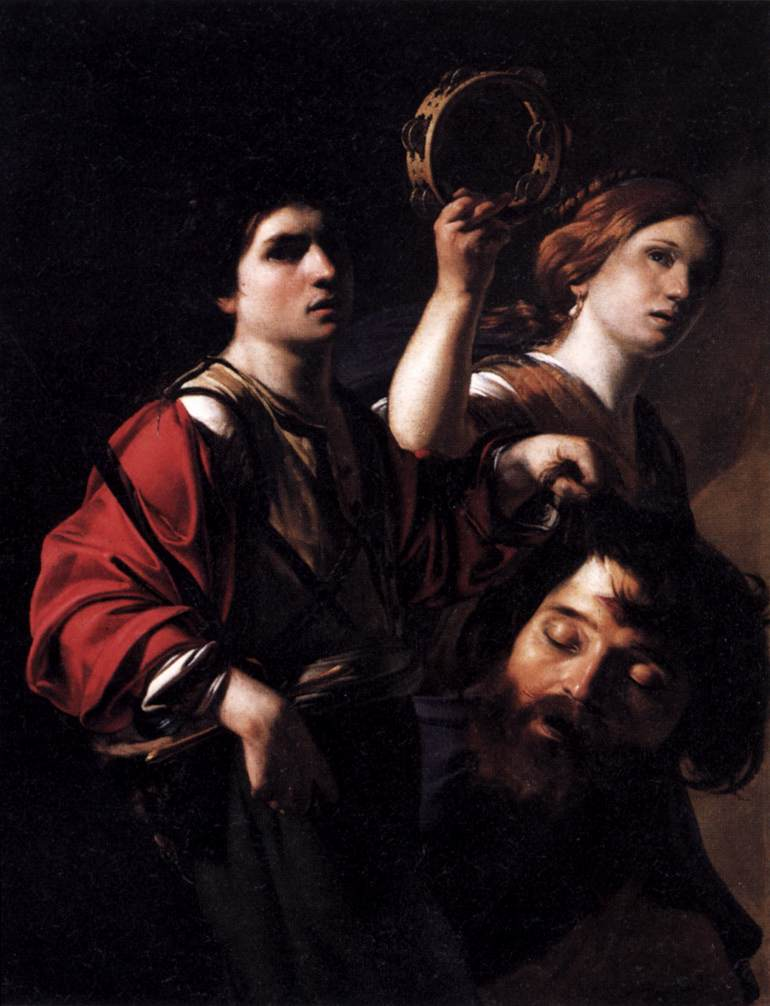
- The Triumph of David, Louvre, Paris
- Born: 25 August 1582; Ostiano, Cremona, Lombardy
- Died: 12 December 1622 (aged 40); Rome, Italy
- Education: Cristoforo Roncalli
- Occupation: Painter
- Known for: Tribute to Caesar (ca. 1610–1620)
- Movement: Baroque

Bartolomeo Manfredi (baptised 25 August 1582 – 12 December 1622) was an Italian painter, a leading member of the Caravaggisti (followers of Michelangelo Merisi da Caravaggio) of the early 17th century.

== Life ==
Manfredi was born in Ostiano, near Cremona. He may have been a pupil of Caravaggio in Rome: at his famous libel trial in 1603 Caravaggio mentioned that a certain Bartolomeo Cristofori, accused of distributing scurrilous poems attacking Caravaggio's detested rival Baglione, had been a servant of his. Certainly, Bartolomeo Manfredi, known to art history, was a close follower of Caravaggio's innovatory style, with its enhanced chiaroscuro and insistence on naturalism, with a gift for storytelling through expression and body language.

Caravaggio, in his brief career – gaining fame in 1600, exiled from Rome in 1606, and dead by 1610 – had a profound effect on the younger generation of artists, particularly in Rome and Naples. And of these Caravaggisti (followers of Caravaggio), Manfredi seems in turn to have been the most influential in transmitting the master's legacy to the next generation, particularly with painters from France and the Netherlands who came to Italy. No documented, signed works by Manfredi survive, and several of the forty or so works now attributed to him were formerly believed to be by Caravaggio. The steady disentangling of Caravaggio from Manfredi has made clear that it was Manfredi, rather than his master, who was primarily responsible for popularising low-life genre painting among the second generation of Caravaggisti.

Manfredi was a successful artist, able to keep his own servant before he was thirty years old, "a man of distinguished appearance and fine behaviour" according to the biographer Giulio Mancini, although seldom sociable. He built his career around easel paintings for private clients, and never pursued the public commissions upon which wider reputations were built, but his works were widely collected in the 17th century, and he was considered Caravaggio's equal or even superior. His Mars Chastising Cupid offers a tantalising hint at a lost Caravaggio: the master promised a painting on this theme to Mancini, but another of Caravaggio's patrons, Cardinal Francesco Maria Del Monte, had taken it, and Mancini therefore commissioned Manfredi to paint another for him, which Mancini considered Manfredi's best work.

Manfredi died in Rome in 1622. Gerard Seghers (or Segers; 1589–1651) was one of his pupils.

== Gallery ==
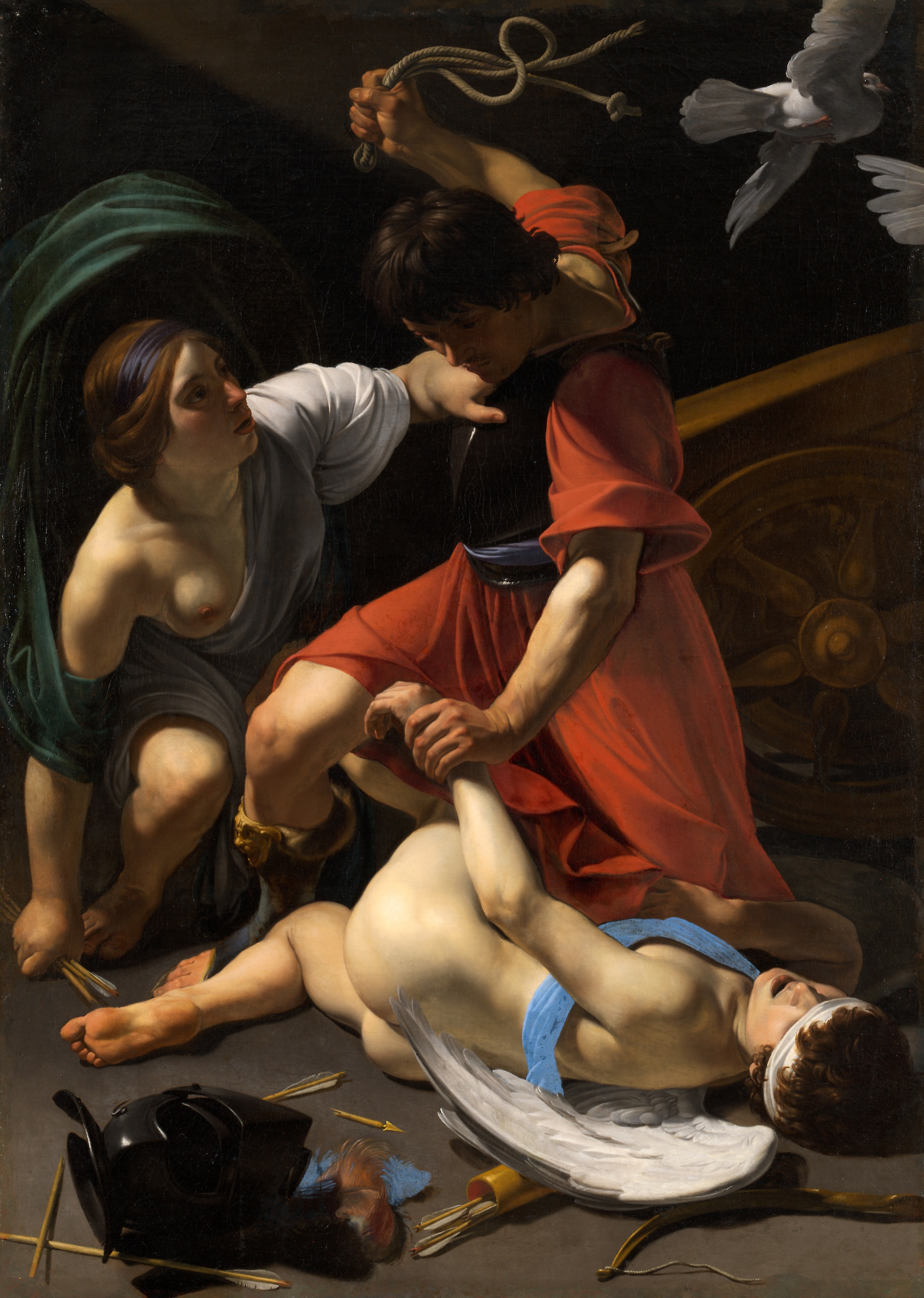
Mars Chastising Cupid, Art Institute of Chicago. Once attributed to Caravaggio, a typical Caravaggesque painting of the type popularised by Manfredi

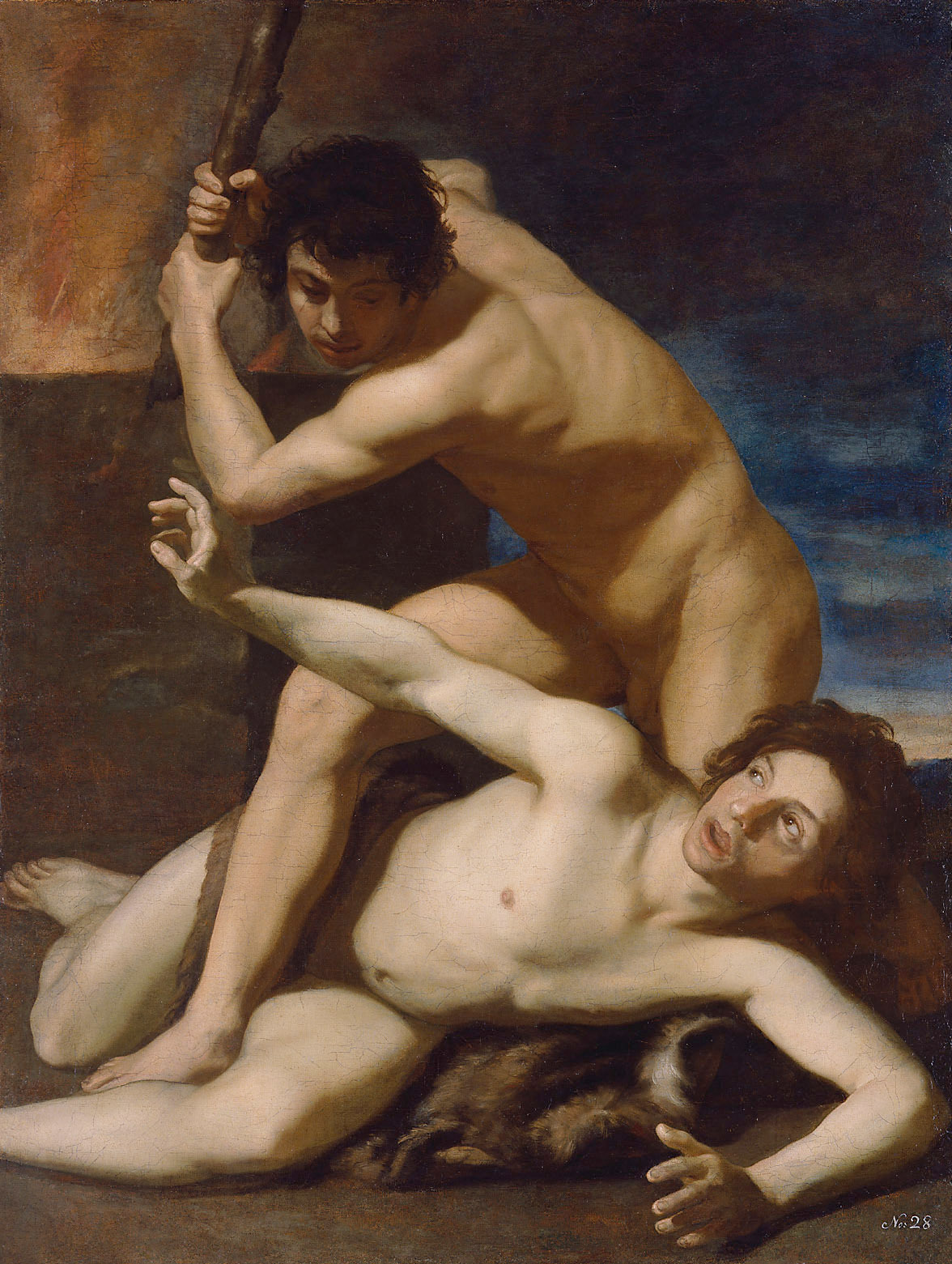
Cain Kills Abel, c. 1600, Kunsthistorisches Museum, Vienna

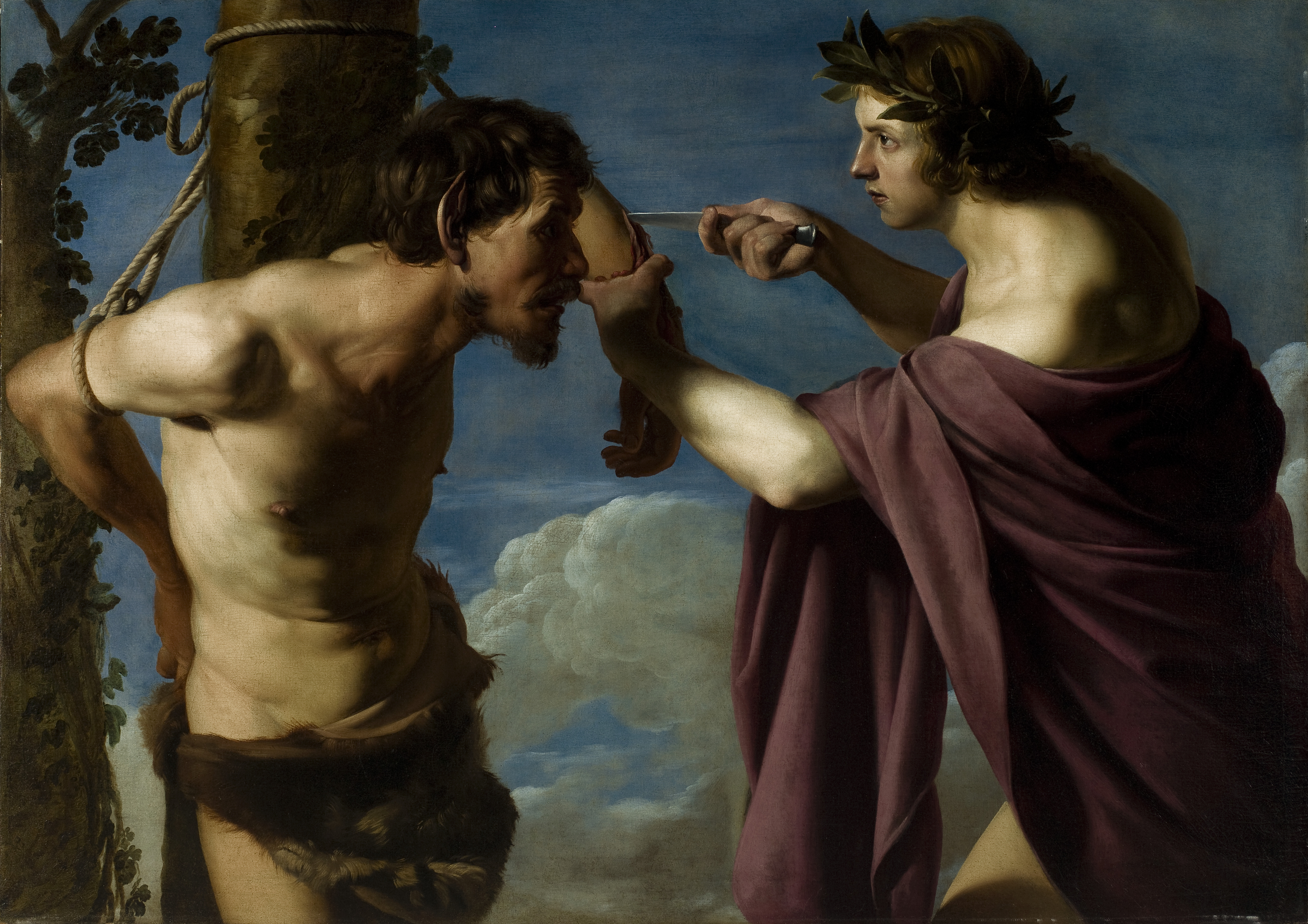
Apollo and Marsyas, c. 1616–1620, Saint Louis Art Museum

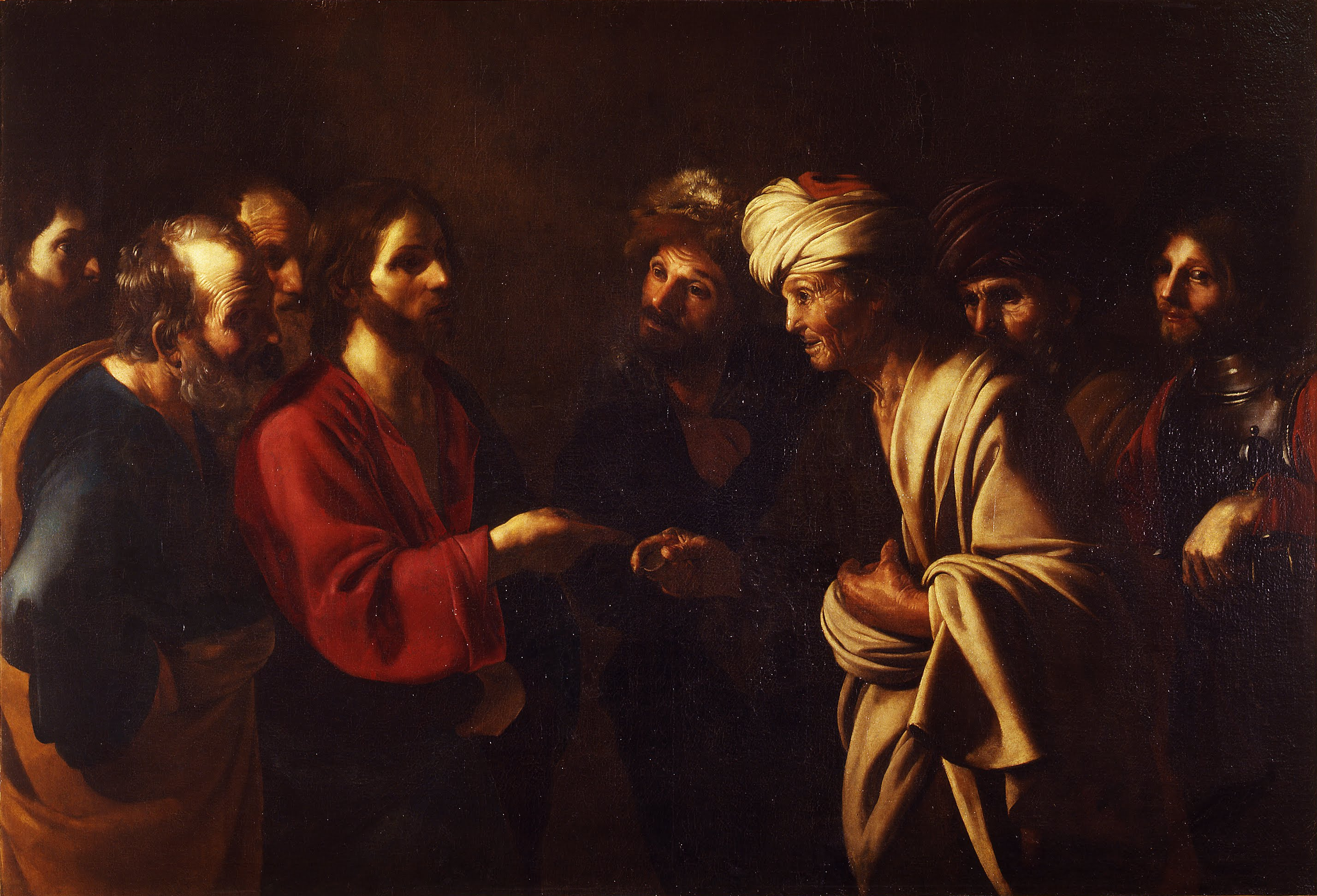
Caesar's Tribute, c. 1610–1620, Uffizi

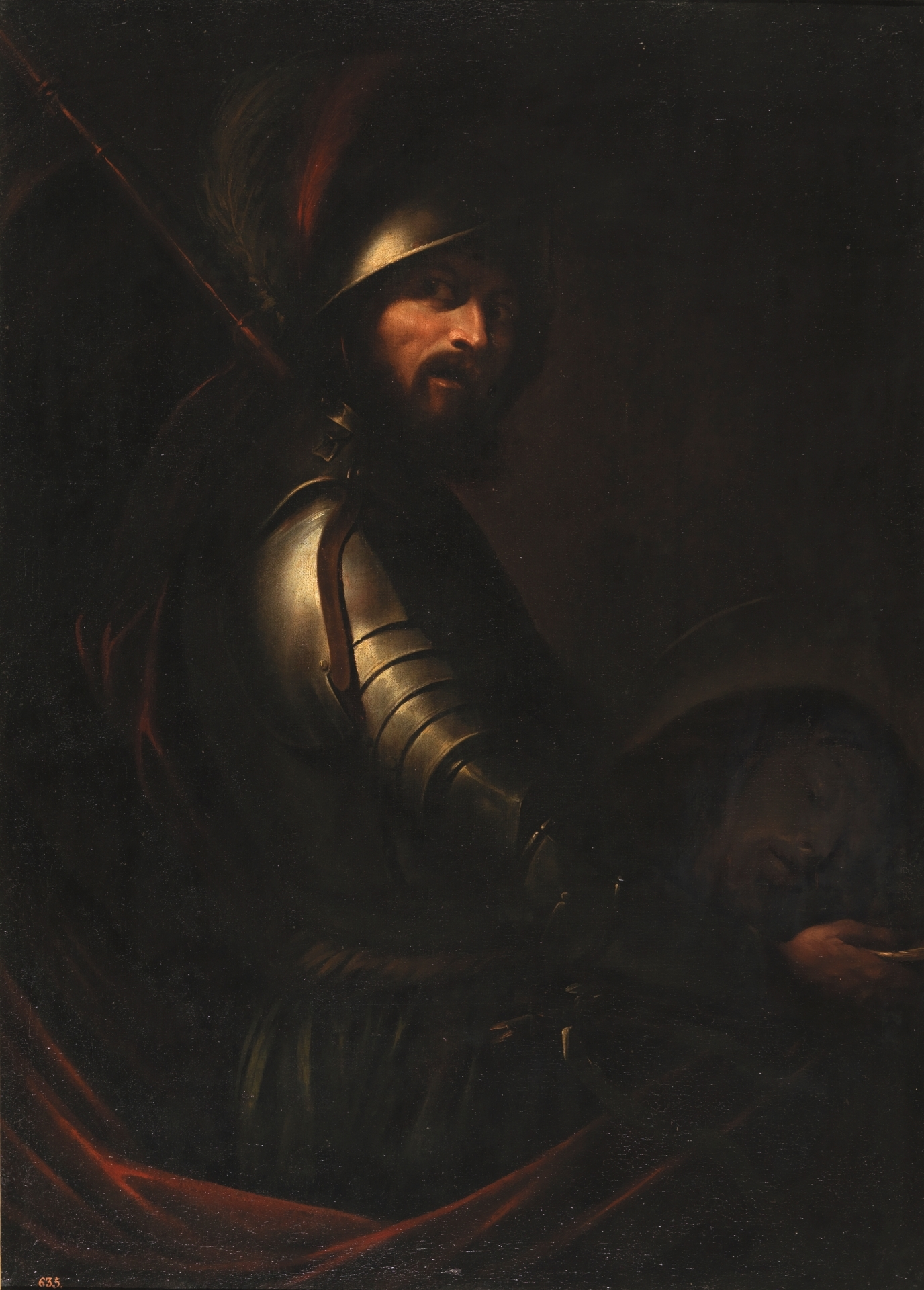
Soldier with the head of St. John the Baptist, Prado Museum, Madrid

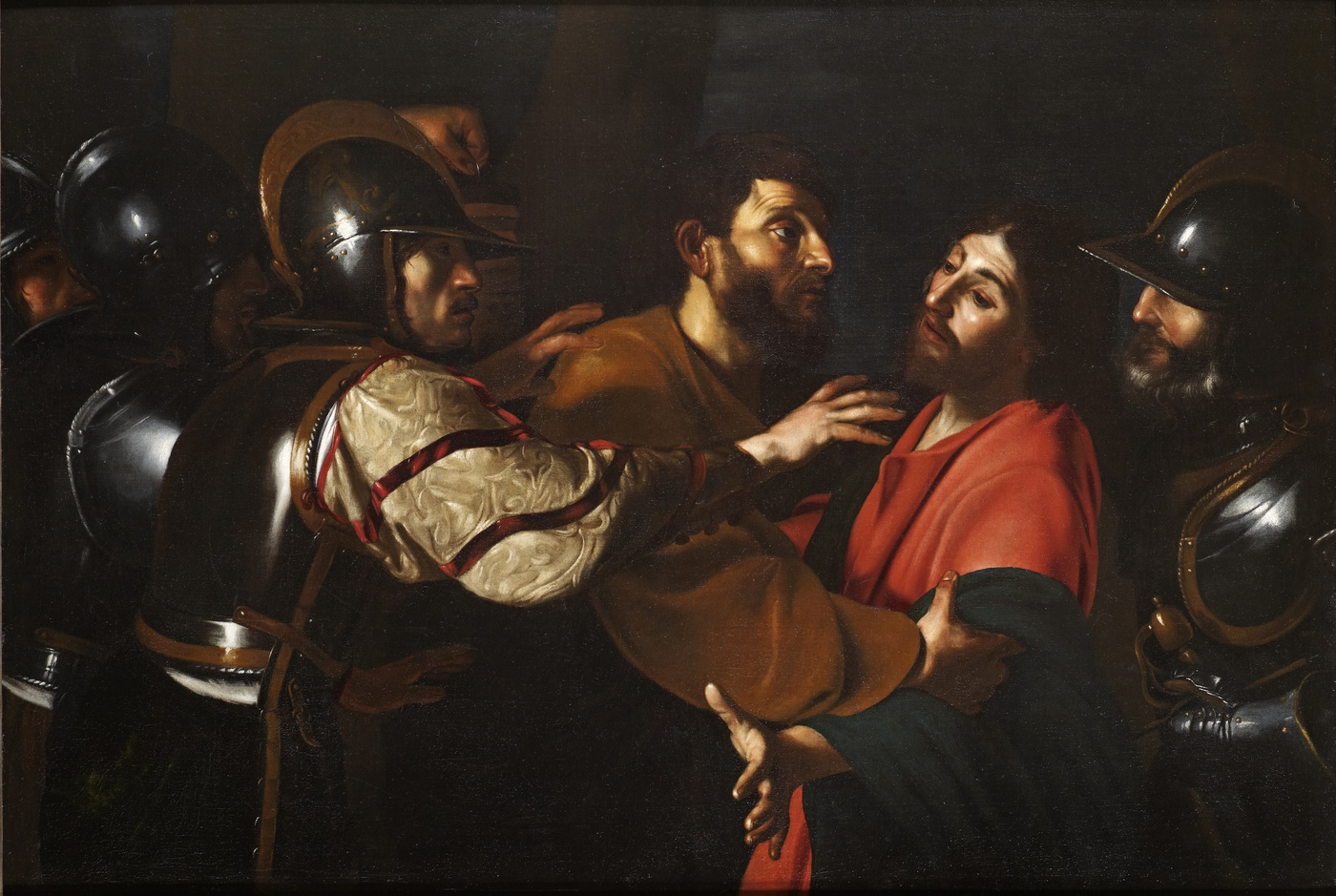
Capture of Christ, 1613–1618, National Museum of Western Art, Tokyo

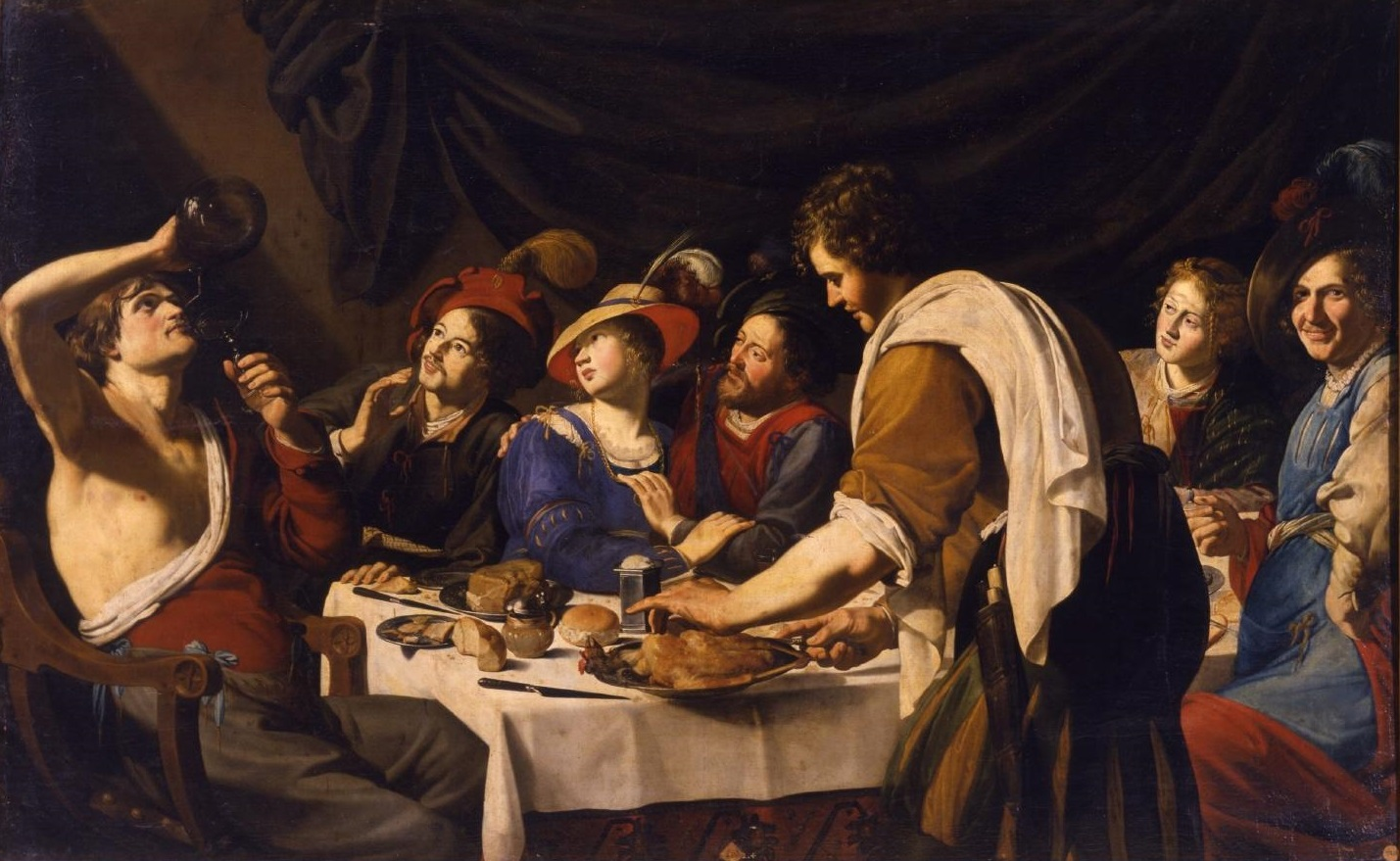
The Banquet, c.1610–1620, Royal Academy of Fine Arts of San Fernando, Madrid

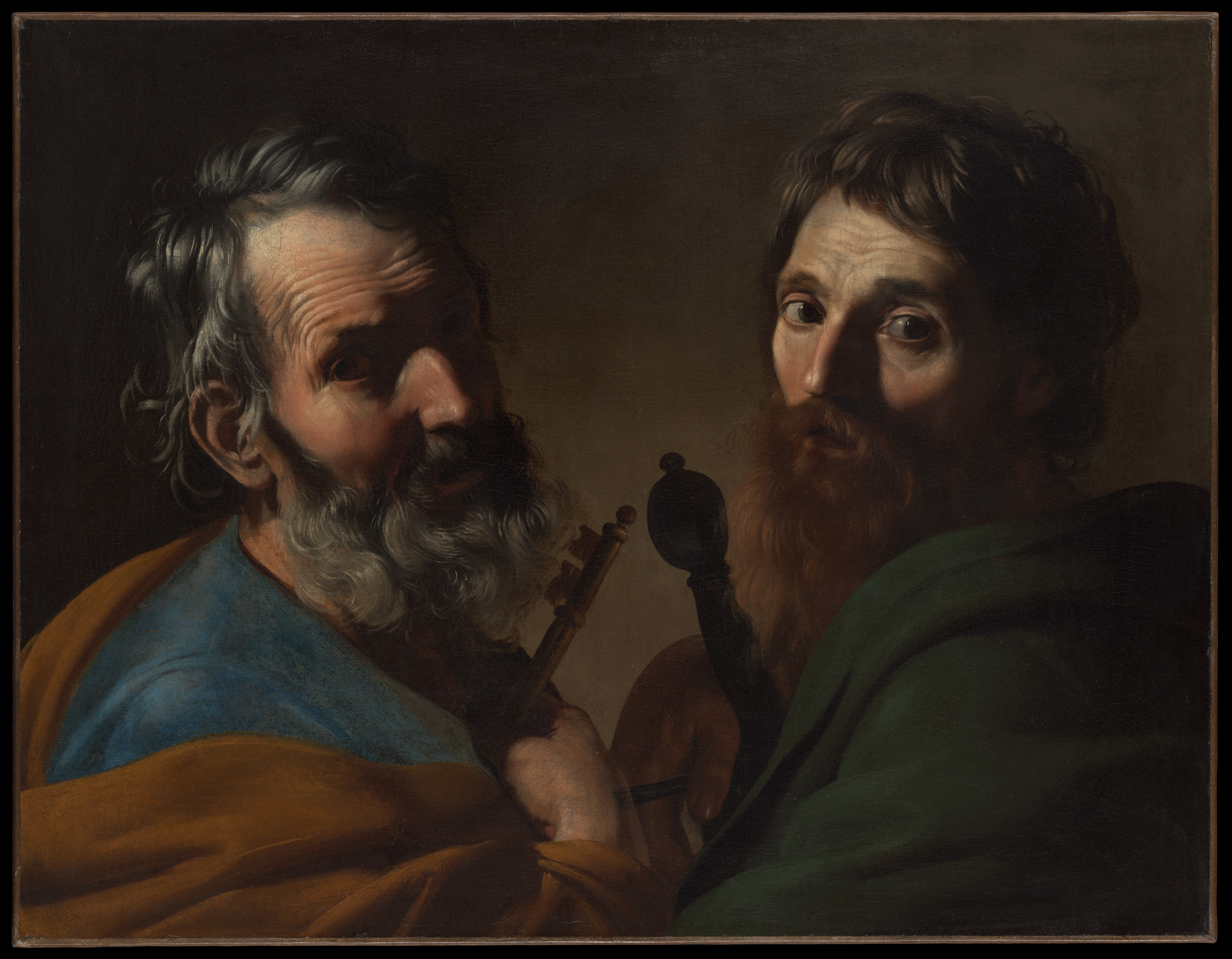
Saints Peter and Paul, c.1619–1620, Metropolitan Museum of Art, New York

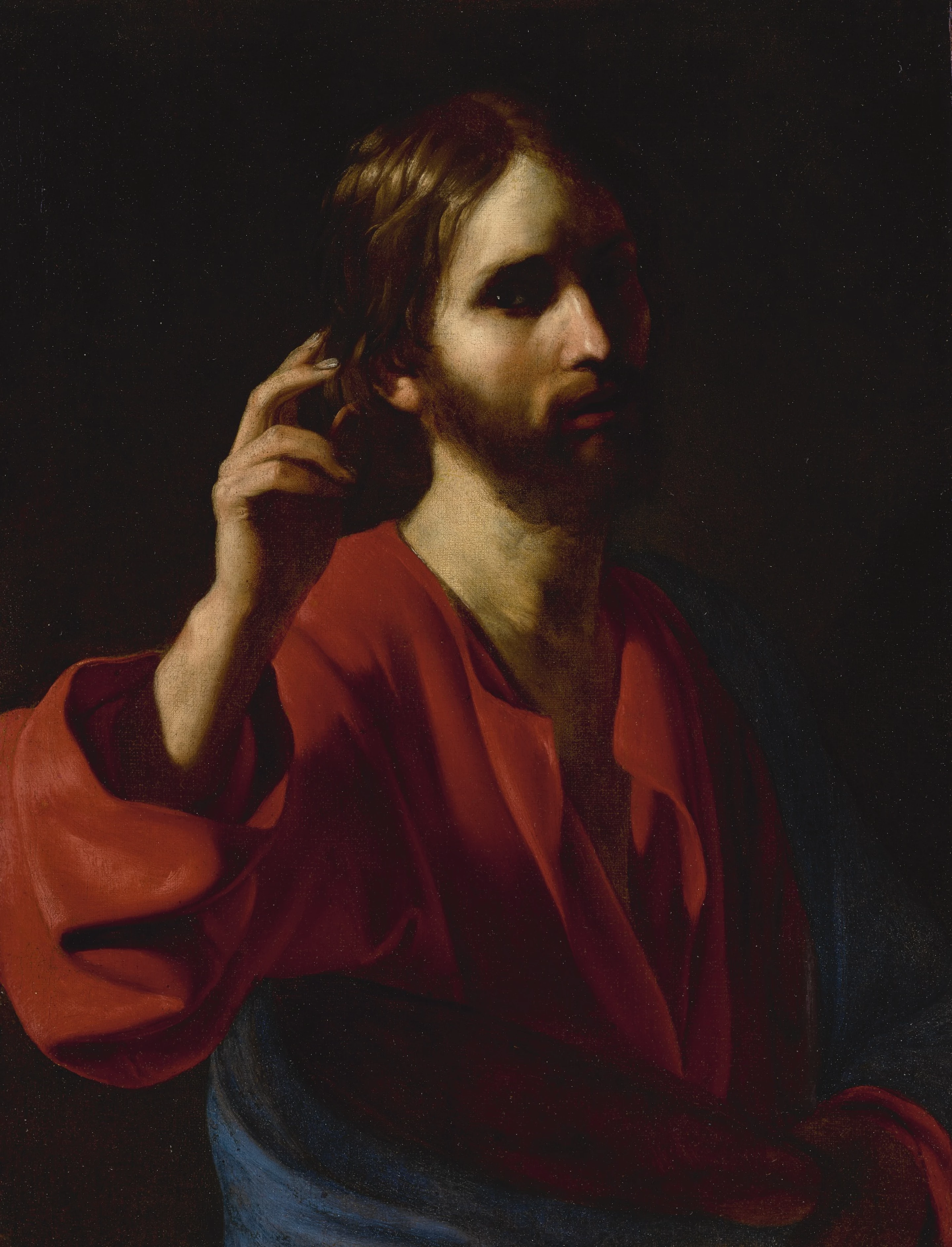
Christ Blessing, private collection
