= Santi Celso e Giuliano =

Roman Catholic basilica, a landmark of Rome, Italy

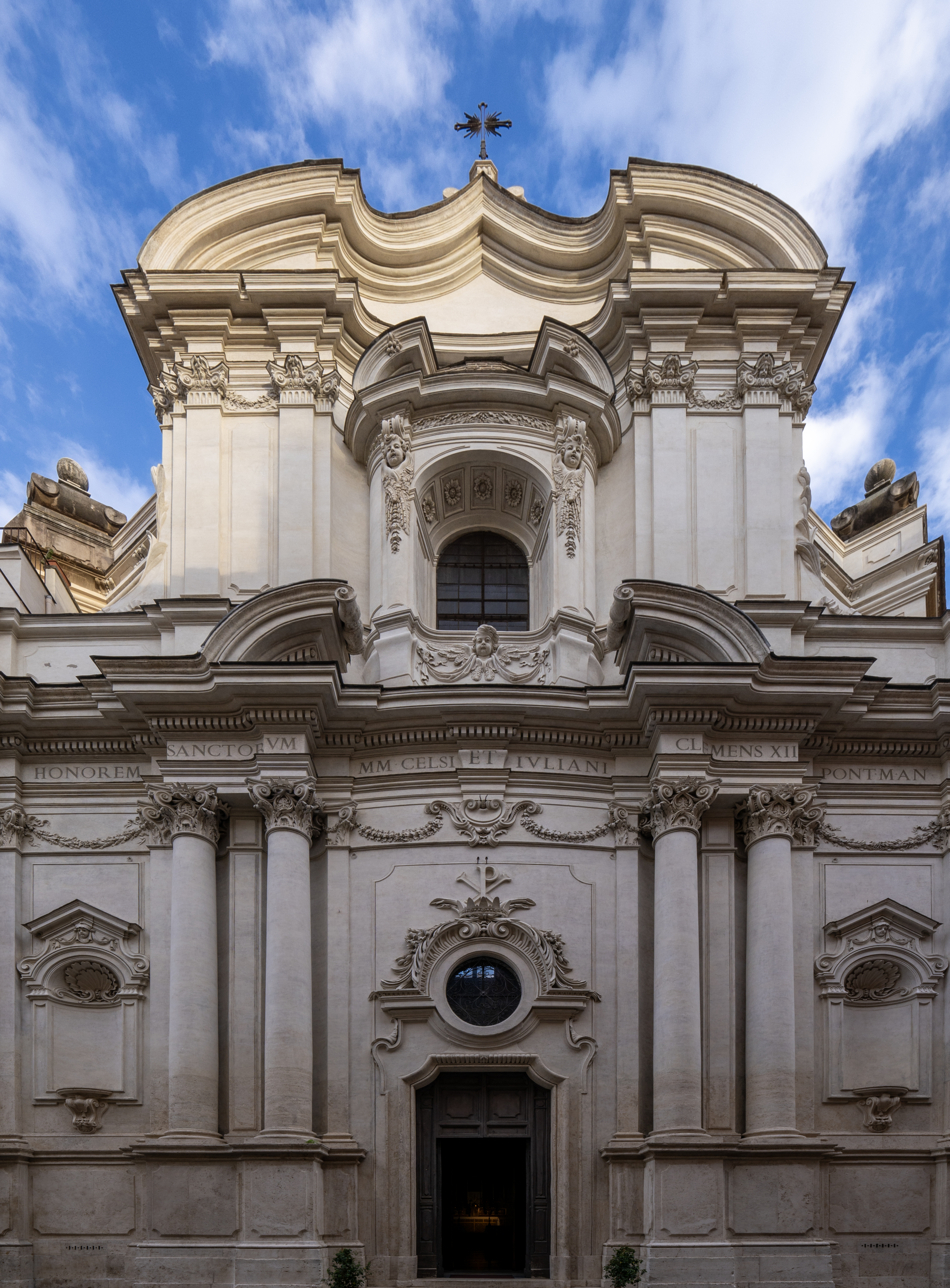
- Facade
- Click on the map for a fullscreen view
- 41°54′2.01″N 12°28′1″E
- Location: Vicolo del Curato 12, Rome
- Country: Italy
- Denomination: Roman Catholic
- Religious institute: Institute of Christ the King Sovereign Priest
- Website: Italian English

History
- Status: Minor basilica

Architecture
- Architect: Carlo de Dominicis
- Style: Baroque

Administration
- Diocese: Diocese of Rome
- Parish: San Giovanni dei Fiorentini

Santi Celso e Giuliano is a minor basilica and papal chapel of the Diocese of Rome in the care of the Institute of Christ the King Sovereign Priest. It has held its basilica status by custom and practice since ancient times. The church is located on Vicolo del Curato number 12, just off Via del Banco di Santo Spirito, the road leading to Ponte Sant'Angelo.

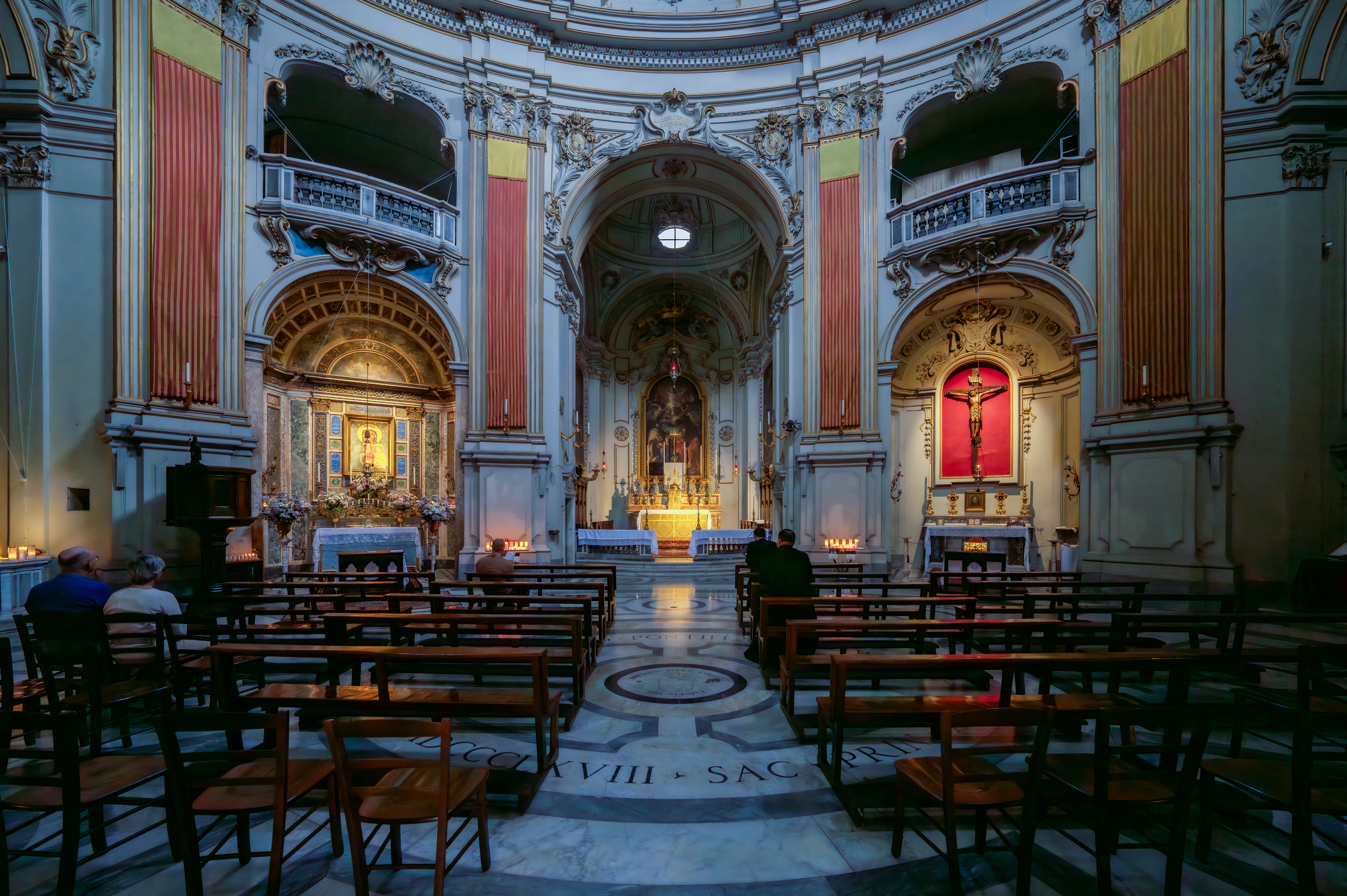
Interior and main altar of the church

== History ==
The first church on the site dated to at least the year 1008, and in 1198 was given the honor of being named a papal chapel. Canons of the collegiate church are mentioned in the fourteenth century and at around the same time it served as the chapel for the procurators of the Audientia, a predecessor body to the Apostolic Signatura.

The church underwent intermittent building and remodeling in the late 1400s and early 1500s, during which time Donato Bramante drafted a design for the building. This, however, was never implemented and the church remained unfinished.

It was also during this time that the church became tied to the Office of Ceremonies, (the predecessor body to the Sacred Congregation of Rites), primarily through the work of Paris de Grassis. Through his dual role as archpriest of the church and head of the Office of Ceremonies, he oversaw the linking of the small, uninfluential Office to the parish, which had many wealthy and influential patrons, and was a popular pilgrimage destination, as it possessed a relic of the left foot of Mary Magdalene since the mid-fifteenth century. The parish was also where many members of the Roman Curia and Papal Court resided.

This connection was strengthened by the church's placement at the start of the strada papale, the processional route a newly elected Pope followed to take possession of St. John Lateran. All processions from the city to St. Peter's passed by the church as well.

Under the 1513 bull Pastoralis Officii, the president of the Office of Ceremonies (who also served as the papal master of ceremonies) received the title of archpriest of the church.

In 1518, Biagio da Cesena, Papal Master of Ceremonies to Pope Leo X, Adrian VI, Clement VII and Paul III, was appointed archpriest of the church. He is remembered principally for his criticism of the nudity presented in The Last Judgment of Michelangelo, who is thought to have portrayed him there as Minos in the inferno.

Under Pope Clement XII, the architect Carlo de Dominicis created the current baroque church which was completed in 1735. The main altarpiece is a Christ in Glory by Pompeo Batoni and commissioned by Cardinal Giuseppe Furietti. This present building has been described as "...one of the loveliest Baroque interiors in the city [of Rome]" and "a fine example of eighteenth-century art".

Eugenio Pacelli, who would become Pope Pius XII in 1939, was baptized in the church 2 days after his birth in 1876.

Pius X transferred the church to the parish of San Giovanni dei Fiorentini in 1906, and in 1912 the canons of the church were given the privilege of prelatial choir dress by him.

On Christmas Eve, 2019, the rector of the basilica invited canons of the Institute of Christ the King Sovereign Priest to take over the church as its home in Rome.

== Archpriests ==
- Giovanni Jacopo Schiafenati
- Giovanni Antonio Sangiorgio
- Paris de Grassis
- Ippolito Morbioli de' Grassi
- Biagio da Cesena
- Lorenzo Pucci

== See also ==
- 18th-century Western domes

Preceded by Santa Cecilia in Trastevere	Landmarks of Rome; Santi Celso e Giuliano	Succeeded by San Clemente
