= Santa Caterina dei Funari =

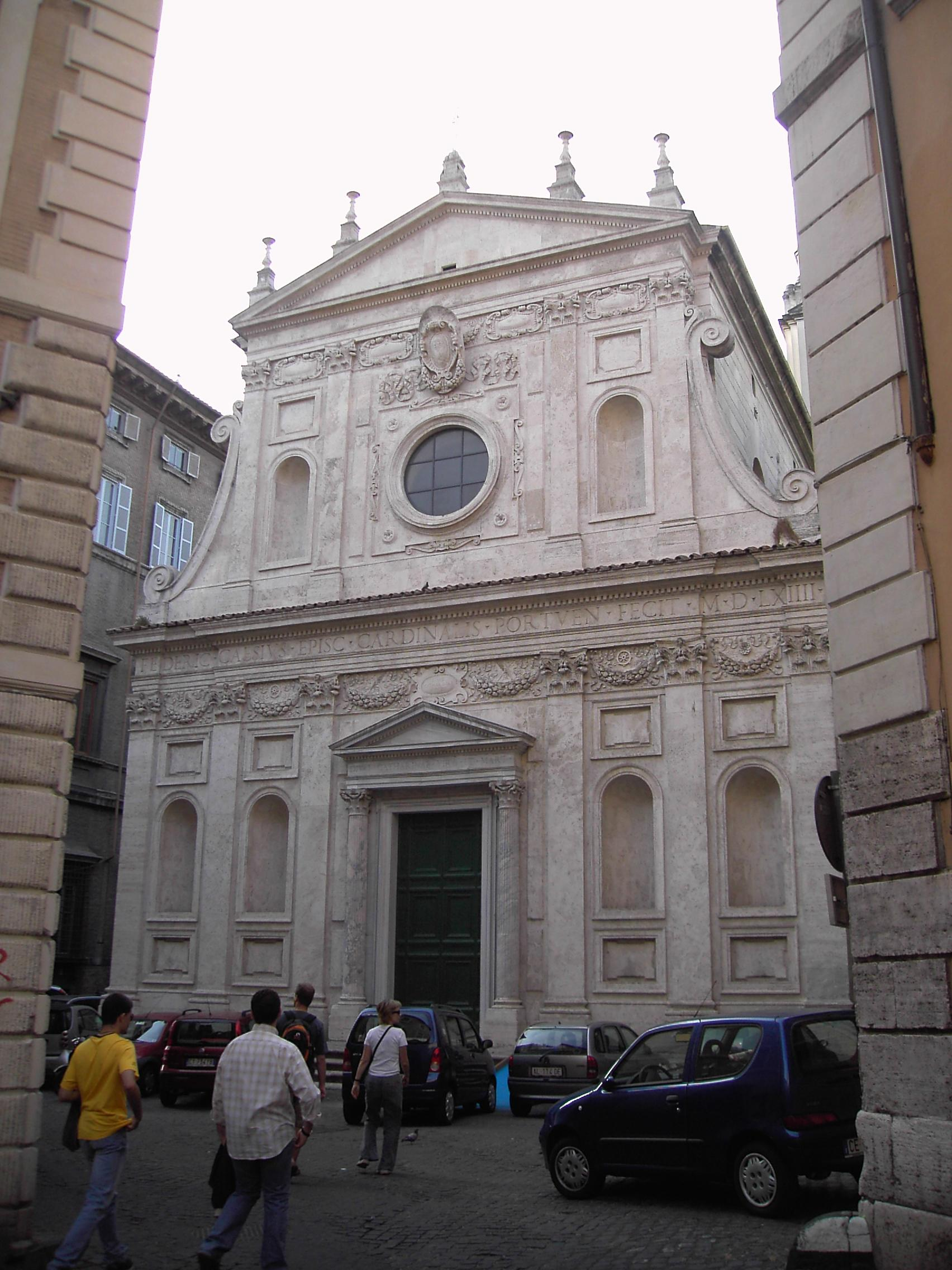
- Facade
- Click on the map for a fullscreen view
- 41°53′38″N 12°28′43″E
- Location: Rome
- Country: Italy
- Denomination: Roman Catholic

Architecture
- Architectural type: Church

Santa Caterina dei Funari is a church in Rome in Italy, in the rione of Sant'Angelo. The church is mainly known for its façade and its interior with frescoes and paintings.

== History ==
The church is located where the Castro Aureo of the Circus Flaminius was located, built by Gaius Flaminius in 221 B.C. Prior to the 13th century, the seats of the surrounding semi-ruined amphitheater were used to dry the wares produced by the string- and rope-makers (funari), hence, the name of the church. Originally a small church dedicated to Santa Rosa di Viterbo was adjacent. The original church was a three-naved basilica, called "Santa Maria Dominae Rosae in Castro Aureo", named for the first time in 1192 in a document of Pope Celestine III. It was rebuilt in the 9th century with a single nave and dedicated to St Catherine of Alexandria and later also called Santa Caterina dei Funari.

In 1534 Pope Paul III granted this church to St. Ignatius of Loyola, founder of the Jesuits. He established in this church the Conservatorio di Santa Caterina della Rosa to provide for the education of poor and homeless girls. A few years later the Company became a Confraternity. Sponsored by Cardinal Federico Cesi, they decided to rebuild the church and name it "Santa Caterina dei Funari". It was built by Guidetto Guidetti between 1560 and 1564, together with Giacomo Barozzi da Vignola and Ottavio Mascherino (1524-1606).

The adjoining convent was demolished in 1940 and never rebuilt.

== Façade ==
The travertine façade shows the influence of other Renaissance churches on the Lombard architect Guidetto Guidetti. In particular, he relied considerably for his design on that of the church of Santo Spirito in Sassia, built by his teacher Antonio da Sangallo the Younger. The careful ornamentation contrasts sharply with the austere architectural arrangement in two sections or storeys, interrelated by lateral scrolls. The sections are divided by pilasters with slightly modified Corinthian capitals. The lower section consists of five bays with six pilasters, three on each side of the entrance. The space between each pair of pilasters is filled by an empty hemispherical niche. Above and underneath each niche is a framed rectangular panel, and the higher panel is in each case surmounted by a festoon. Within its surrounding pilasters, the aedicular entrance is flanked by two Corinthian columns which support an architrave (with the dedication DIVAE CATHARINAE VIRG. ET MART.- "Saint Catharine, virgin and martyr") and above this a triangular pediment. The top of each of these two capitals is adorned with cornucopias and cherub's heads. The festoon over the pediment carries two iconographical symbols of martyrdom: a palm branch and a sword, the latter being the instrument of the saint's martyrdom. The other festoons contain a wheel, her intended instrument of martyrdom.

The upper section or storey consists of three bays flanked by a volute on each side. The middle bay is filled by a rose window within a quadrilateral frame with a rose in each corner. Above the rose window stands the escutcheon of the Cesi family flanked by ornamental ribbons. The remaining two other bays each contain once more an empty hemispherical niche, above each a framed rectangular panel. The spaces between the capitals and below the pediment are filled by four ornamented oval cartouches.

The façade is surmounted by a triangular pediment with four acroteria in the form of identical vases and in the middle an iron cross.

This façade would become a model for the design of the façade of the Church of the Gesu by Giacomo della Porta, built a decade later.

The façade bears the inscription FEDERIC CAESIVS EPISC CARDINALIS PORTVEN FECIT M.D.LXIIII (“Federico Cesi, Cardinal Bishop of Porto built 1564”).

== Interior ==
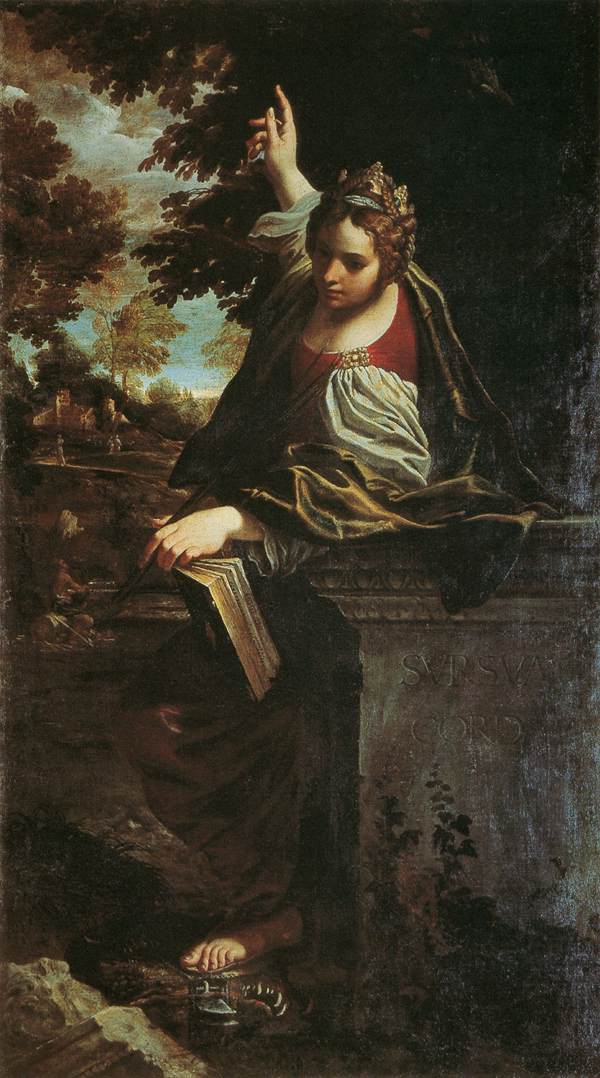
St Margaret of Antioch, Annibale Carracci

The groundplan of the church's interior has a single nave, defined by half-columns with Corinthian capitals along the walls, with a vaulted ceiling and lunettes in the upper part. There are three semi-circular chapels on each side. The austere interior contrasts with a wealth of decoration executed by important artists from the late 16th and early 17th centuries.

The altarpiece Saint Margaret of Antioch (1600) by Annibale Carracci in the chapel of Santa Margherita depicts the saint. The same artist also painted the altarpiece "St. Barbara" in the first chapel on the right. The Ruiz chapel, the second chapel on the right has an altarpiece (a Deposition) painted by Girolamo Muziano. Together with the third chapel on the right side, it was designed by Vignola but finished by Mascherino. The altarpiece in the third chapel (the Assumption of Mary) is ed by Scipione Pulzone [1598].

The altarpiece in the third chapel on the left depicts the story of S. Giovanni" by Marcello Venusti.

The altarpiece above the main altar shows a "Glory of St. Catherine" by Livio Agresti. In the apse Raffaellino da Reggio frescoed some monochrome friezes of putti and of Saints Romanus, Augustine, Sisinius and Saturninus, while several of the decorations in the sanctuary (scenes from the live of St. Catherine and a panel) are by Federico Zuccari.

== Sources ==
- Barbara J. Sabatine, The church of Santa Caterina dei Funari and the Vergini miserabili of Rome, Ph; Diss., University of California, Los Angeles 1992.
- S. Caterina dei Funari, La storia del Monastero e della Chiesa, Rome, (booklet published by the Conservatorio di S. Caterina della Rosa).
