= Saint Margaret of Antioch (Carracci) =

Painting by Annibale Carracci

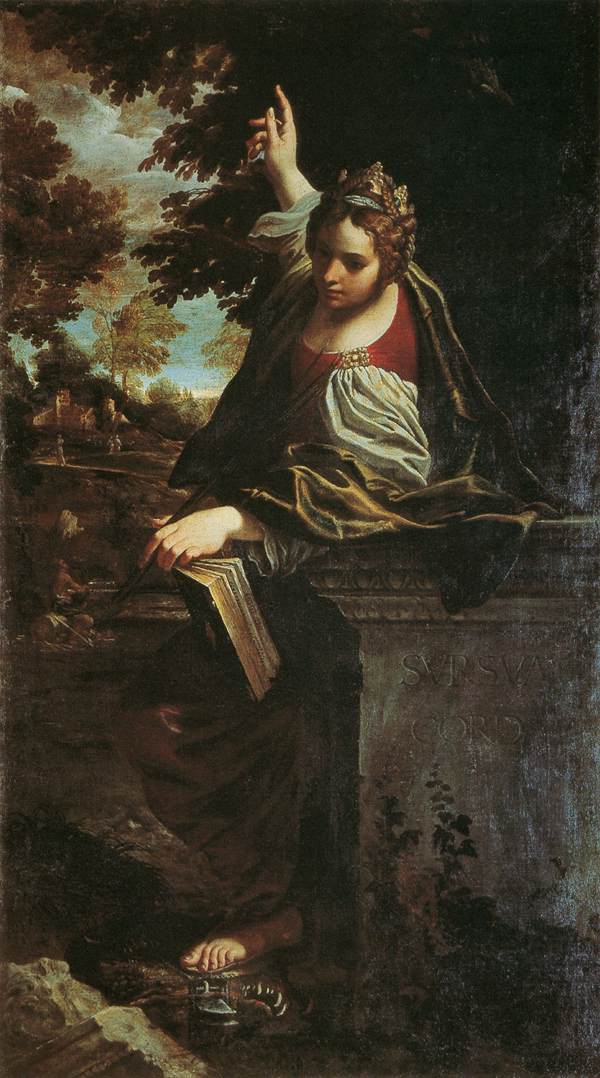
Saint Margaret of Antioch (1599) by Annibale Carracci

Saint Margaret of Antioch is a 1599 oil on canvas painting by Annibale Carracci, showing Margaret of Antioch. It hangs in Santa Caterina dei Funari church in Rome.

== History ==
It was commissioned by Gabriele Bombasi for the chapel he had acquired at Santa Caterina dei Funari in Rome. He was a scholar from Reggio Emilia who had been tutor to Ranuccio and Odoardo Farnese and had moved to Rome in Odoardo's service. It now hangs in Santa Caterina dei Funari church in Rome. Carracci painted several works in Reggio Emilia, none still in their original locations. According to one theory, Carracci's contact with Bombasi was pivotal for his career and may even have been how he first came to the attention of Odoardo Farnese, who summoned him to Rome in 1595 or 1596 and kept him in his service for the rest of his life. By express wish of the commissioner, the painting reproduces (with slight variations) Saint Catherine of Alexandria in the artist's 1592 San Luca Madonna, produced for Reggio Emilia Cathedral and now in the Louvre.

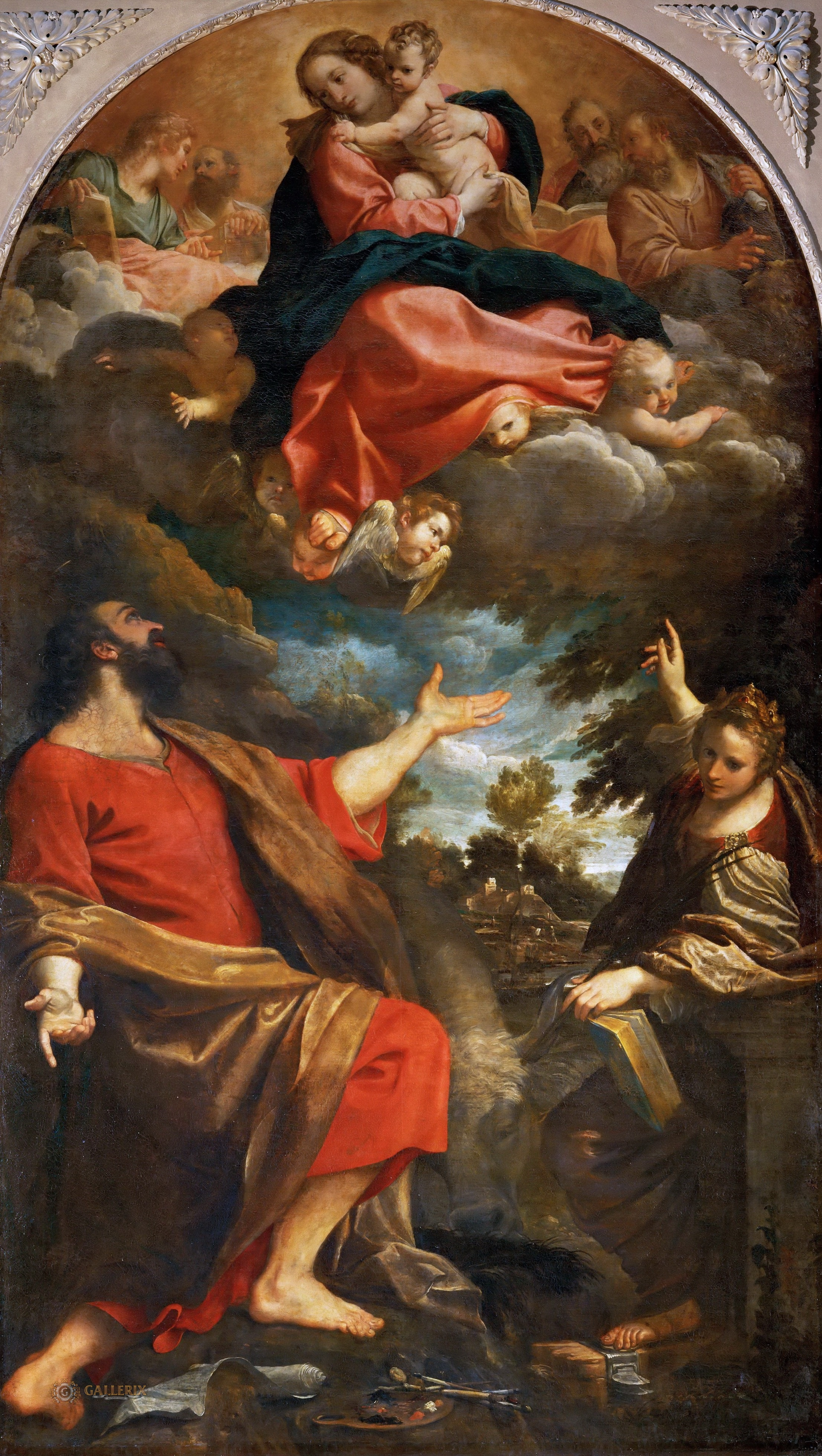
Annibale Carracci, The Virgin Mary Appears to Saint Luke and Saint Catherine (San Luca Madonna), 1592, Louvre, Paris.

Sources disagree on whether it is a fully autograph work. Giovanni Pietro Bellori's 1672 The Lives of the Artists states the work was copied from the San Luca Madonna by Carracci's pupil as Lucio Massari, with Carracci himself retouching the dragon and the landscape. Giulio Mancini's 1620 Considerazioni sulla pittura instead argued it was a fully autograph work, produced in Bologna before being moved to the Palazzo Farnese and then to Rome, where it was placed in the Bombasi Chapel.

The news reported by Bellori had a wide following in the subsequent literature (for a long time, therefore, the work was considered the fruit of the contribution of Massari, albeit as a copyist), but reconsiderations on the painting – determined by a restoration in the 1950s – have led critics to attribute the Santa Margherita entirely to Carracci, a thesis now widely accepted.

Although it is most likely not the first work Annibale ever painted in Rome, "Saint Margaret" is Carracci's first Roman work exhibited in a place freely accessible to the public. This circumstance contributed to spreading Annibale's fame in the city, as evidenced by the famous episode handed down by Bellori according to which the canvas was greatly appreciated by Caravaggio.

Bellori wrote:

Once the painting was placed on the altar, the painters flocked to it because of its novelty, and amidst their various discussions, Michel Angelo da Caravaggio, after having stopped to look at it for a long time, turned around and said: "I am happy that in my time I also see a painter".

This account is confirmed by Francesco Albani, who, in a letter, states of the canvas painted for Bombasi, "Caravaggio was dying over it".

The canvas of Santa Caterina dei Funari has been traditionally associated with Annibale's Roman beginnings and therefore initially dated around 1595–1596. Documentary discoveries on the circumstances of Bombasi's acquisition of the chapel have led to the execution of the painting being postponed by a few years (which studies place around 1599), a circumstance which, moreover, makes plausible the hypothesis that the painting was executed in Rome.

== Description and style ==
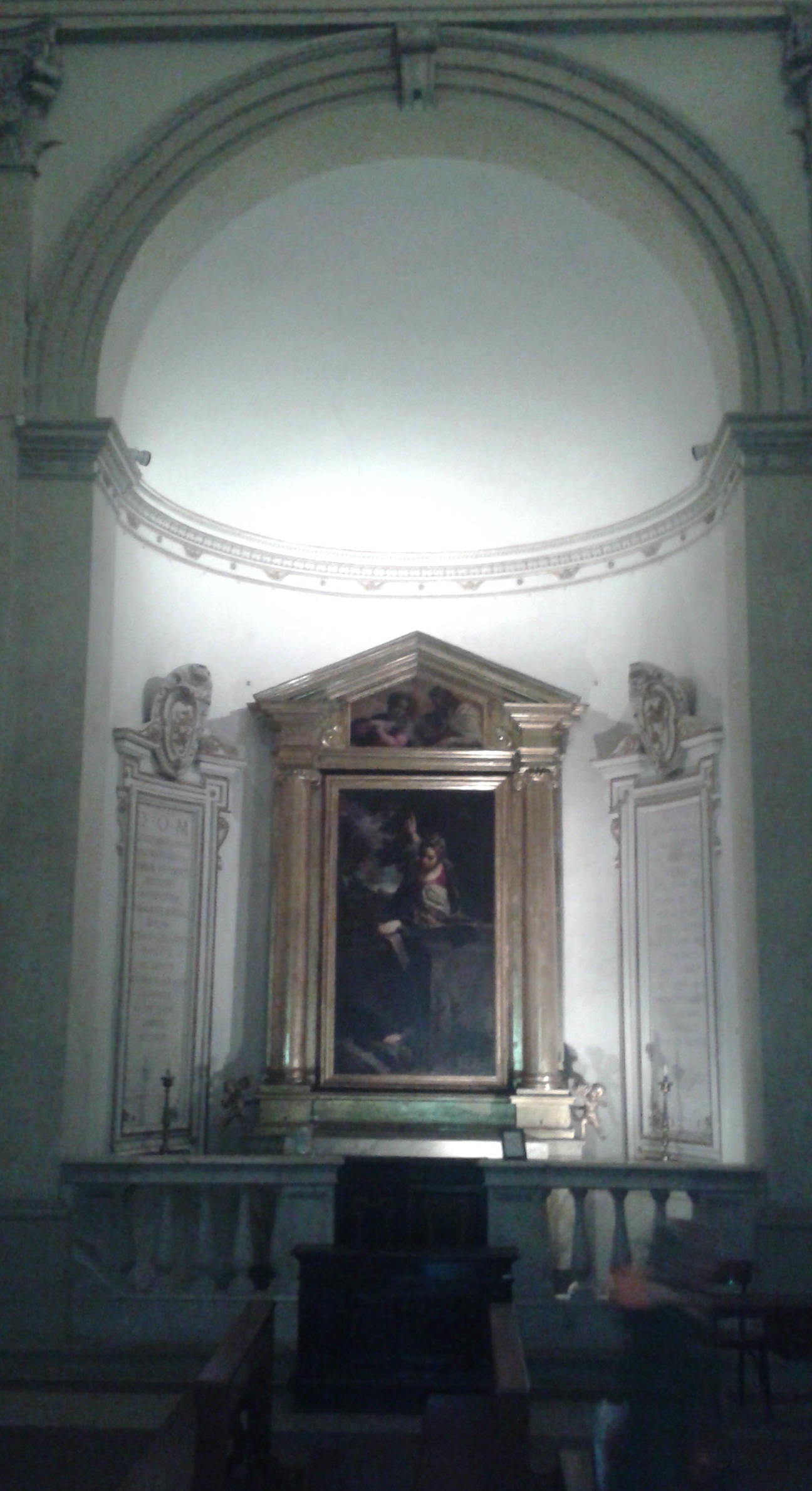
Cappella Bombasi, Santa Caterina dei Funari, Rome. Overall view of Annibale's altarpiece with original frame and cymatium

The canvas is still placed in its original gilded wooden frame, probably designed by Annibale himself, and is surmounted by a cymatium depicting the Coronation of the Virgin.

The cymatium is commonly believed to be the work of Innocenzo Tacconi (another collaborator of Annibale) executed on a design by Carracci and is a derivation of the Coronation by Correggio once in the apse of the church of San Giovanni Evangelista in Parma.

The Saint Margaret of the main canvas – splendidly dressed and wearing princely jewels – is depicted resting her left arm on an ancient pedestal on which appears the inscription "SURSUM CORDA".

In her left hand, Margaret simultaneously holds a holy book and the palm that symbolizes her martyrdom. With her right hand, the martyr points upward toward the cymatium with the coronation of Mary. With her left foot, she crushes the devil, who, consistent with the saint's hagiography, is depicted in the guise of a dragon.

The work is characterised by a strong naturalism also favoured by the careful use of light and chiaroscuro effects – particularly evident on the saint's face – which accentuate the three-dimensionality of the painting.

The wide landscape view recalls the lesson of Titian.

The painting must have struck the Rome of the time for the extreme novelty (an aspect also highlighted by Bellori) that it constituted in the artistic panorama of the city, then dominated by figures such as Zuccari and the Cavalier d'Arpino, creators of a late Mannerism that was by now tired, but still privileged in the large official commissions. Perhaps this is precisely why Caravaggio liked it so much, as he too was close – in the shortly following decoration of the Contarelli Chapel – to indicating a new path to painting.

According to some critics, it was the vision of Annibale's Santa Margherita that provided Caravaggio a decisive impulse for the works he painted for San Luigi dei Francesi.

The success of this work is also testified by the large number of engravings based on it, one of the most notable of which is that of the Dutch artist Cornelis Bloemaert, undated but datable to the mid-seventeenth century.

== Gallery ==
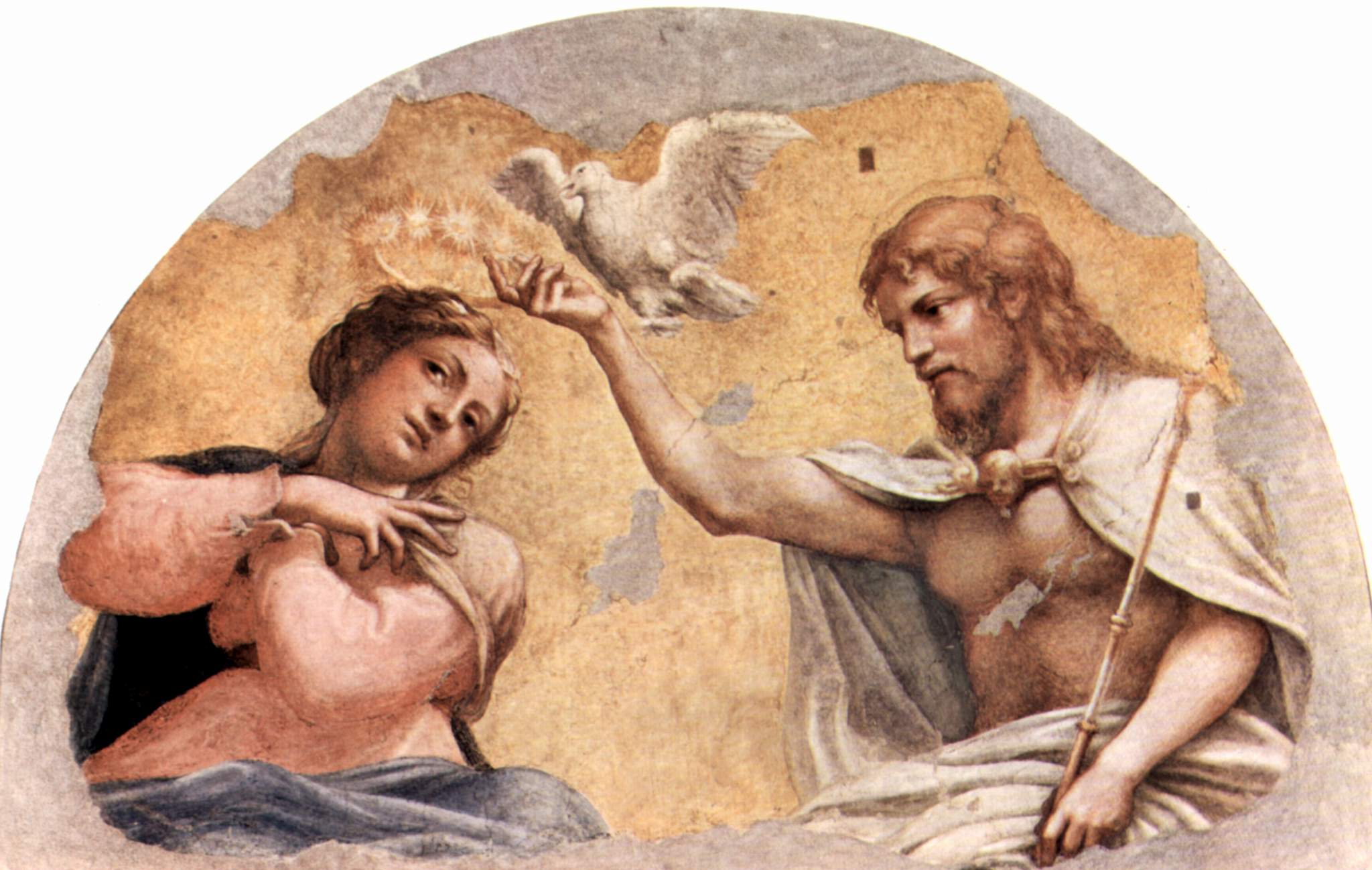
Correggio, Coronation of the Virgin, 1521, Galleria nazionale di Parma

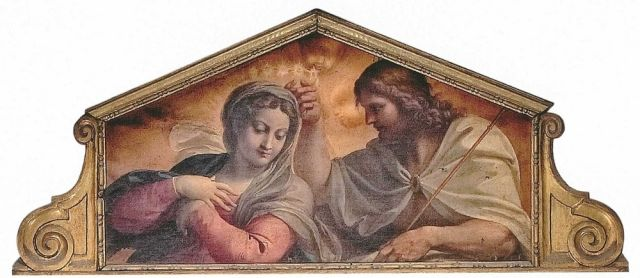
Innocenzo Tacconi and Annibale Carracci, Coronation of the Virgin, cymatium to the Saint Margaret of Antioch altarpiece, circa 1600 ca., Santa Caterina dei Funari church

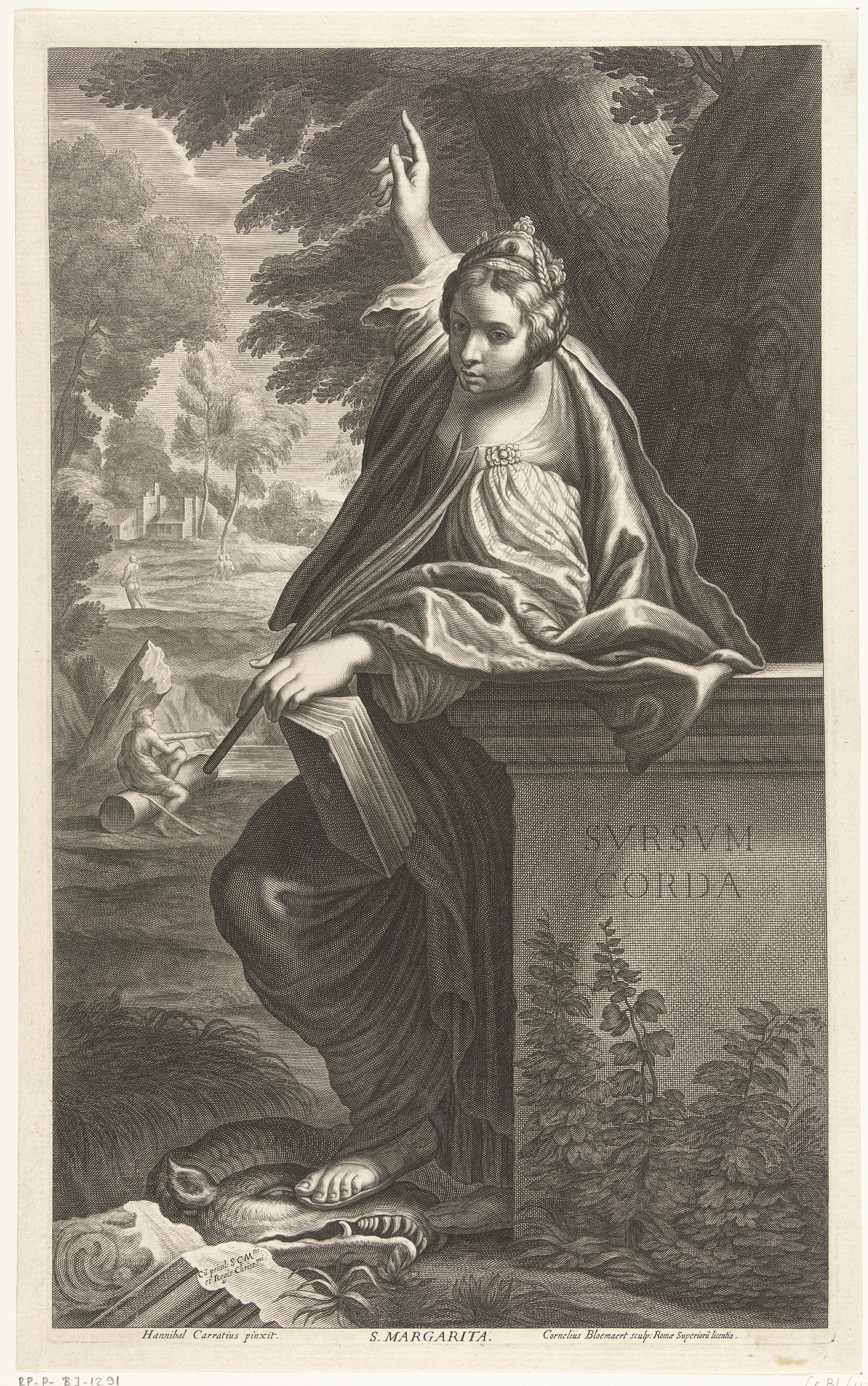
Print after the painting by Cornelis Bloemaert
