= Girolamo Muziano =

Italian painter (c. 1532–1592)

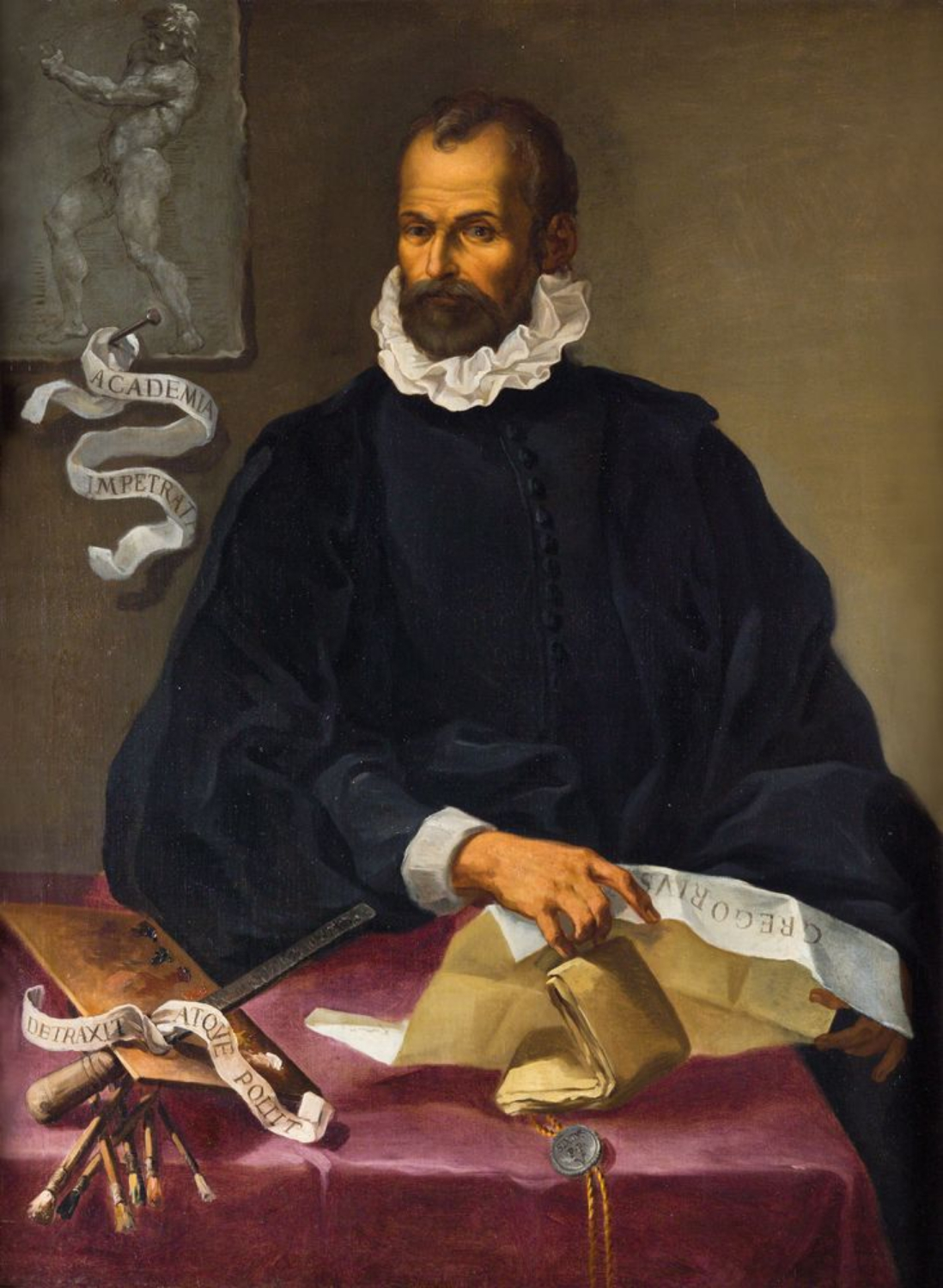
Portrait of Girolamo Muziano by Pier Leone Ghezzi, 1595.

Girolamo Muziano or Mutiani (c. 1532 – 1592), was an Italian painter, one of the most prominent artists active in Rome in the mid-to-late sixteenth century.

== Life ==
He was born in Acquafredda, near Brescia, but worked mainly in Rome.

Accounts from the 16th to 20th centuries said that Muziano began work under the tutelage of Romanino, an imitator of Titian. Yet, a nearly autobiographical story of Muziano written by his confessor (unpublished until 1954) indicates instead that Muziano was born in Brescia, and left this town as a young man, and that his first apprenticeship was under Domenico Campagnola and Lambert Sustris in 1544–46 in the town of Padua. He then spent time in Venice until 1549, but moved permanently to Rome about 1550.

Landscapes figured prominently in Muziano's early work, leading the Romans to nickname him Il giovane dei paesi (the young man of the landscapes). Although he produced drawings and paintings in this genre throughout his career, his interest shifted towards grand manner figure painting. Muziano painted religious and historical subjects in a style based largely on Michelangelo, giving great prominence to the monumental anatomy of his figures, even in works depicting ascetic saints. His Resurrection of Lazarus (1555), painted for the Colonna palace in Subiaco, established his fame. Michelangelo himself pronounced its author one of the "first artists of that age". The painting was later placed in the church of Santa Maria Maggiore above Muziano's tomb; it was afterwards transferred to the Quirinal Palace, and now is in the Vatican Pinacoteca. Its techniques of spatial organization and narrative composition are more typical of the High Renaissance than of Muziano's Mannerist contemporaries.

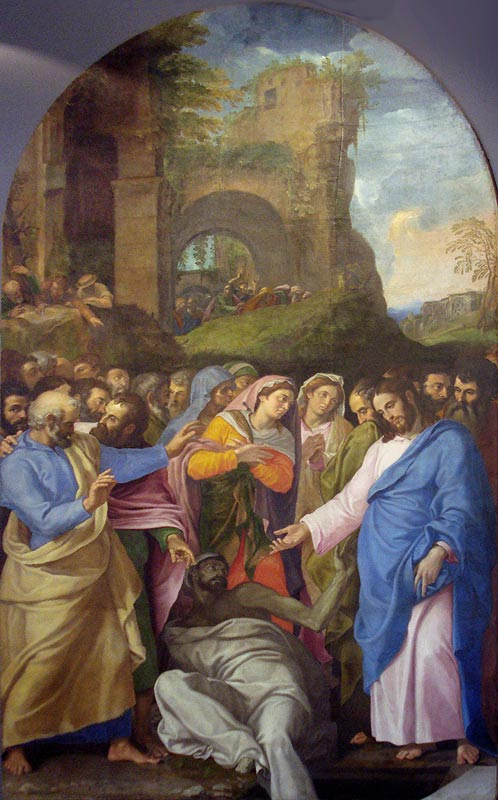
Resurrection of Lazarus, 1556. Museo dell'Opera del Duomo, Orvieto

Muziano came to be the leading artist in Rome during the 1570-80s, painting in a style that appealed to Counter-Reformation patrons. He worked for Cardinal Ippolito II d'Este from 1560 to 1566, and his frescoes for the Cardinal's villas in Tivoli could be seen in Villa d'Este.

His most noted paintings include Circumcision, formerly the high altarpiece in the church of the Gesù (although now removed to a corridor behind the sacristy), paintings for three chapels in Santa Maria in Aracoeli, and St Jerome preaching to Monks in the Desert in Santa Maria degli Angeli. This last painting was one of two altarpieces that Muziano painted for St. Peter's Basilica during his time as superintendent of works for Pope Gregory XIII (the other painting, a "Mass of St. Basil", is lost, although it is recorded in an etching by Jacques Callot). Muziano also designed mosaics for the Gregorian Chapel in the basilica, and was responsible for re-founding the Academy of St Luke (Accademia di San Luca) in Rome (1577). His works can also be seen in Santa Caterina dei Funari, the Palazzo Colonna (portrait of Vittoria Colonna), the Cathedral Museum of Orvieto, and the church of San Francesco in Frascati.

Muziano died in 1592, and was buried in the church of Santa Maria Maggiore. Among his pupils were Paolo Rossetti of Cento and Cesare Nebbia.

== Anthology of works ==
- Christ greets the Ambassadors of John the Baptist - Museo antico Tesoro- Loreto
- Landscape with waterfall (drawing)
- Three paintings
Hercules slaying Nemean Lion – First Labor (1565), Villa d'Este, Tivoli.

Hercules slaying Lernaean Hydra – Second Labor (1565), Villa d'Este, Tivoli.

Hercules steals the Apples of the Hesperides – Twelfth Labor (1565), Villa d'Este, Tivoli.

Hercules slays the Stymphalian Birds – Sixth Labor (1565), Villa d'Este, Tivoli.

Hercules captures Cretan Bull – Seventh Labor (1565), Villa d'Este, Tivoli.

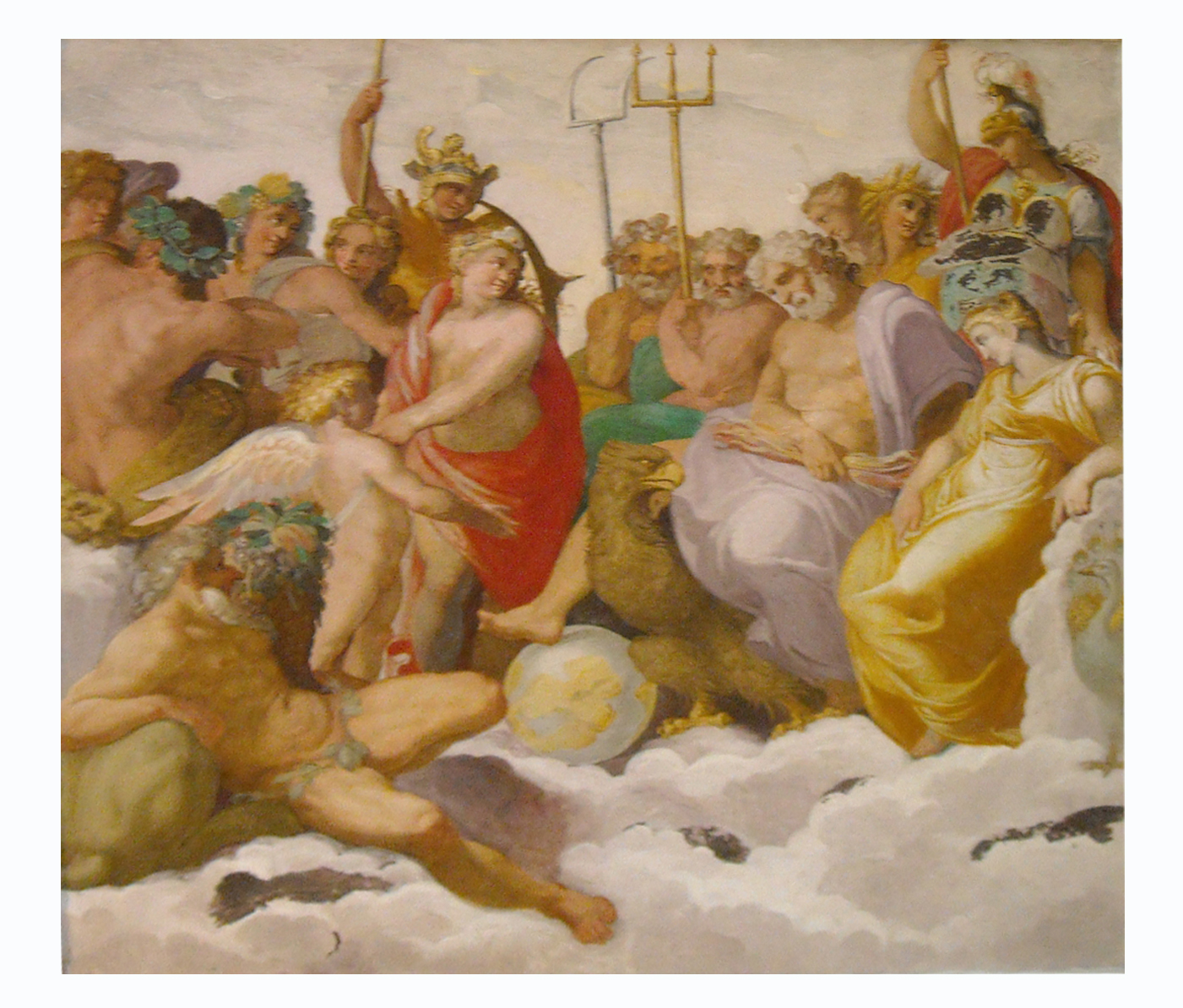
Apotheosis of Hercules (1565), Villa d'Este, Tivoli.

== Sources ==
- Freedberg, Sydney J. (1993). Pelican History of Art (ed.). Painting in Italy, 1500–1600. pp. 344–345 Penguin Books Ltd.
