= Marcello Venusti =

Italian painter

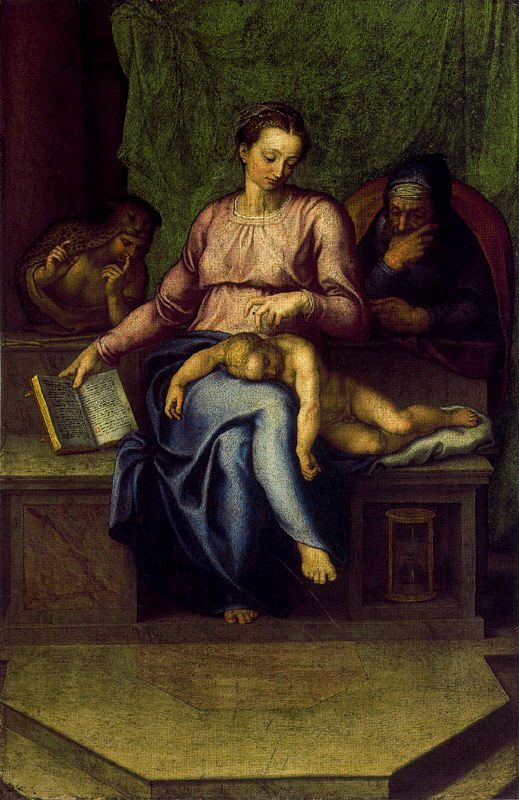
Marcello Venusti, Holy Family, oil on wood, 43.2 x 28.6 cm, c. 1565. National Gallery, London

Marcello Venusti (1512 – 15 October 1579) was an Italian Mannerist painter active in Rome in the mid-16th century.

Native to Mazzo di Valtellina near Como, he was reputed to have been a pupil of Perino del Vaga. He is known for a scaled copy in oils (now Museo di Capodimonte, Naples) of Michelangelo's Last Judgement in the Sistine Chapel, commissioned by Cardinal Alessandro Farnese, and completed in the master's lifetime and meeting his approval. This is the best record of how the fresco looked before many of the nude figures had draperies added in the 1560s, though Venusti quietly adjusted some of Michelangelo's discrepancies in scale between the figures.

His painting of Christ in the Garden is in the Galleria Doria Pamphilj. Buonarroti engaged him to paint an Annunciation from his design for the Capella de' Cesi in the church of Santa Maria della Pace. The copy of the Last Judgment is now at Naples. In the Palazzo Borghese there is a Christ bearing His Cross by him, from a design by Michelangelo. A Prayer on the Mount of Olives is in Sant' Ignazio at Viterbo, and a Holy Family and a Christ expelling the Money-Changers in the National Gallery in London. Alnwick Castle in Northumberland also displays a Holy Family. There is also a Christ in Purgatory in Palazzo Colonna in Rome.

Also attributed to Venusti are a number of altarpieces for Roman churches, such as for the church of Santa Maria sopra Minerva, for the first chapel on the left, he painted Resurrected Christ appears to Mary Magdalene. He also painted for the Chapel of St James apostle in this church. For the church of San Silvestro al Quirinale, he painted a Birth of Christ for the third chapel. For the church of San Bernardo della Compagnia (demolished in the 18th century), he painted St Bernard triumphing over a Demon. For the church of Santa Caterina dei Funari, he painted a John the Baptist preaching for the main chapel on the right.

== Works ==
- Christ at the Column, La Salle University Art Museum, Philadelphia
- Christ in the Garden, Galleria Doria Pamphilj
- Portrait of Michelangelo (about 1535), oil on canvas (36 x 27 cm), Casa Buonarotti, Florence
- Frescoes of the Chapel of the Rosary, Santa Maria sopra Minerva, Rome
- Frescoes at the San Giovanni Battista chapel, Santa Caterina dei Funari, Rome
- The Holy Family, Alnwick Castle
