= The Last Judgment (Michelangelo) =

Sistine Chapel fresco by Michelangelo

- Il Giudizio Universale (Italian)
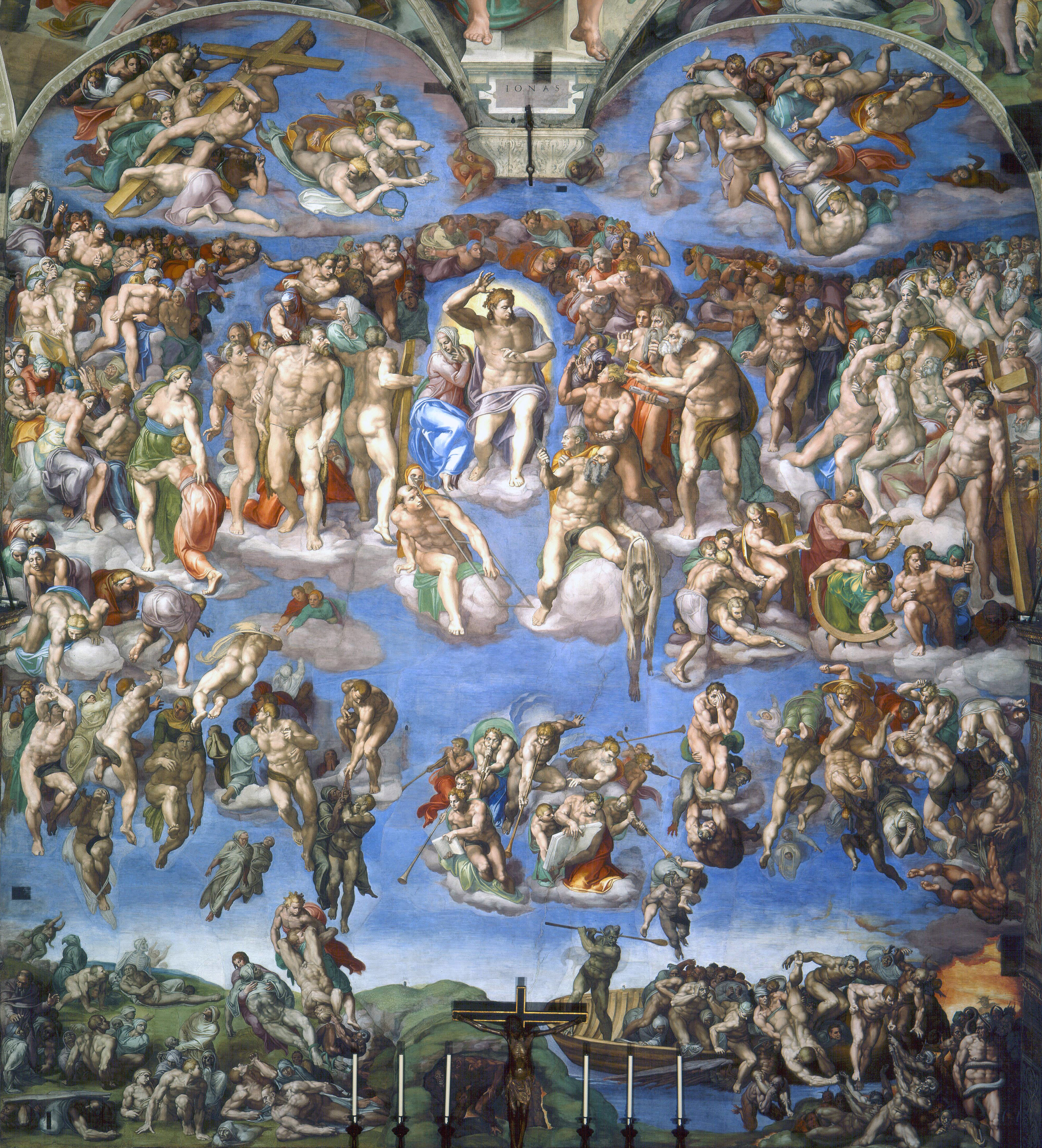
- Artist: Michelangelo
- Year: 1536–1541
- Type: Fresco
- Dimensions: 13.7 m × 12 m (539.3 in × 472.4 in)
- Location: Sistine Chapel, Vatican City; 41°54′10″N 12°27′15″E
- Preceded by: Sistine Chapel ceiling
- Followed by: The Conversion of Saul

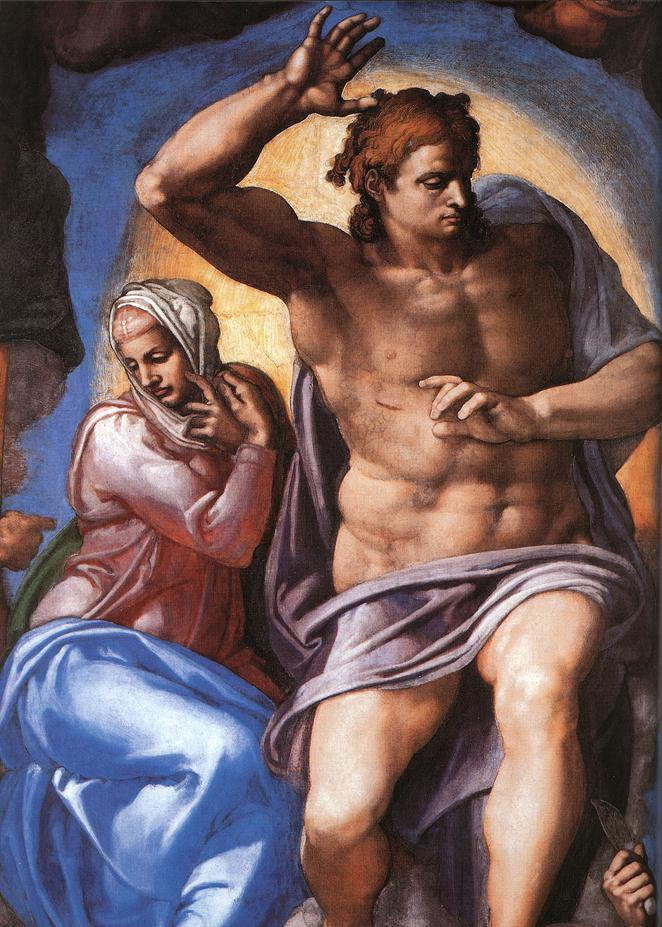
Mary and Christ

The Last Judgment (Italian: Il Giudizio Universale) is a fresco by the Italian Renaissance painter Michelangelo covering the whole altar wall of the Sistine Chapel in Vatican City. It is a depiction of the Second Coming of Christ and the final and eternal judgment by God of all humanity. The dead rise and descend to their fates, as judged by Christ who is surrounded by prominent saints. Altogether there are over 300 figures, with nearly all the males and angels originally shown as nudes; many were later partly covered up by painted draperies, of which some remain after recent cleaning and restoration.

The work took over four years to complete between 1536 and 1541 (preparation of the altar wall began in 1535). Michelangelo began working on it 25 years after finishing the Sistine Chapel ceiling, and was nearly 67 at its completion. He had originally accepted the commission from Pope Clement VII, but it was completed under Pope Paul III whose stronger reforming views probably affected the final treatment.

In the lower part of the fresco, Michelangelo followed tradition in showing the saved ascending at the left and the damned descending at the right. In the upper part, the inhabitants of Heaven are joined by the newly saved. The fresco is more monochromatic than the ceiling frescoes and is dominated by the tones of flesh and sky. The cleaning and restoration of the fresco, however, revealed a greater chromatic range than previously apparent. Orange, green, yellow, and blue are scattered throughout, animating and unifying the complex scene.

The reception of the painting was mixed from the start, with much praise but also criticism on both religious and artistic grounds. Both the amount of nudity and the muscular style of the bodies has been one area of contention, and the overall composition another.

== Description ==
Where traditional compositions generally contrast an ordered, harmonious heavenly world above with the tumultuous events taking place in the earthly zone below, in Michelangelo's conception the arrangement and posing of the figures across the entire painting give an impression of agitation and excitement, and even in the upper parts there is "a profound disturbance, tension and commotion" in the figures. Sydney J. Freedberg interprets their "complex responses" as "those of giant powers here made powerless, bound by racking spiritual anxiety", as their role of intercessors with the deity had come to an end, and perhaps they regret some of the verdicts. There is an impression that all the groups of figures are circling the central figure of Christ in a huge rotary movement.

At the centre of the work is Christ, shown as the individual verdicts of the Last Judgment are pronounced; he looks down towards the damned. He is beardless, and "compounded from antique conceptions of Hercules, Apollo, and Jupiter Fulminator", probably, in particular, the Belvedere Apollo, brought to the Vatican by Pope Julius II. However, there are parallels for his pose in earlier Last Judgments, especially one in the Camposanto of Pisa, which Michelangelo would have known; here the raised hand is part of a gesture of ostentatio vulnerum ("display of the wounds"), where the resurrected Christ reveals the wounds of his Crucifixion, which can be seen on Michelangelo's figure.

To the left of Christ is his mother, Virgin Mary, who turns her head to look down towards the Saved, though her pose also suggests resignation. It appears that the moment has passed for her to exercise her traditional role of pleading on behalf of the dead; with John the Baptist this Deesis is a regular motif in earlier compositions. Preparatory drawings show her standing and facing Christ with arms outstretched, in a more traditional intercessory posture.

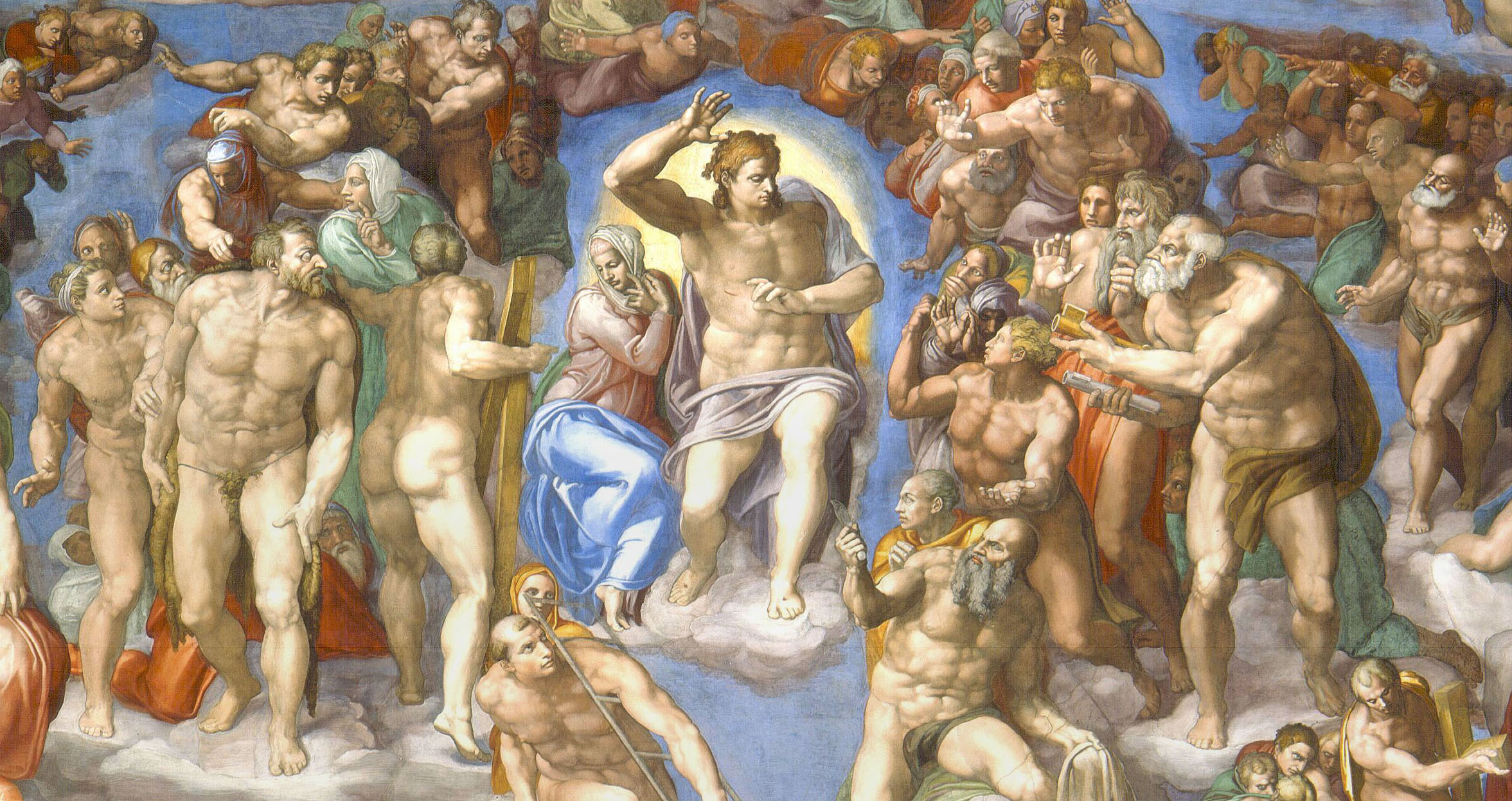
The central group around Christ

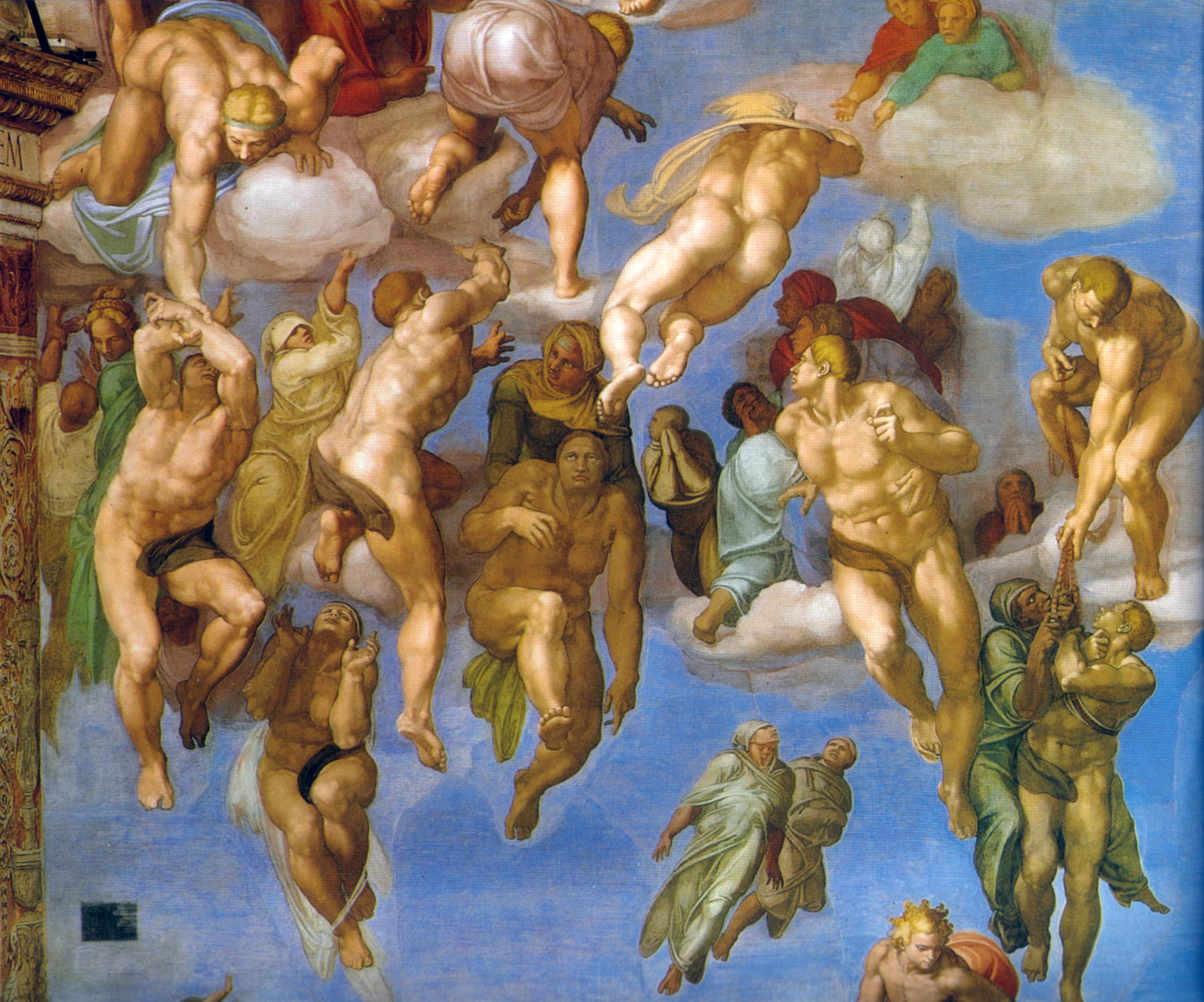
A group of the Saved

Surrounding Christ are large numbers of figures, the saints and the rest of the elect. On a similar scale to Christ are John the Baptist on the left, and on the right St. Peter, holding the keys of Heaven and perhaps offering them back to Christ, as they will no longer be needed. Several of the main saints appear to be showing Christ their attributes, the evidence of their martyrdom. This used to be interpreted as the saints calling for the damnation of those who had not served the cause of Christ, but other interpretations have become more common, including that the saints are themselves not certain of their own verdicts and try at the last moment to remind Christ of their sufferings.

Other prominent saints include St. Bartholomew below Peter, holding the attribute of his martyrdom, his own flayed skin. The face on the skin is usually recognized as being a self-portrait of Michelangelo. St. Lawrence is also present, along with the gridiron on which he was roasted. Also depicted is St. Catherine with a portion of the wheel on which she was supposed to have been broken, St. Sebastian, holding the bundle of arrows with which he was shot, and St. Blaise with two metal combs that were used to tear the flesh off his back. Many others, even of the larger saints, are difficult to identify. Ascanio Condivi, Michelangelo's tame authorized biographer, says that all Twelve Apostles are shown around Christ.

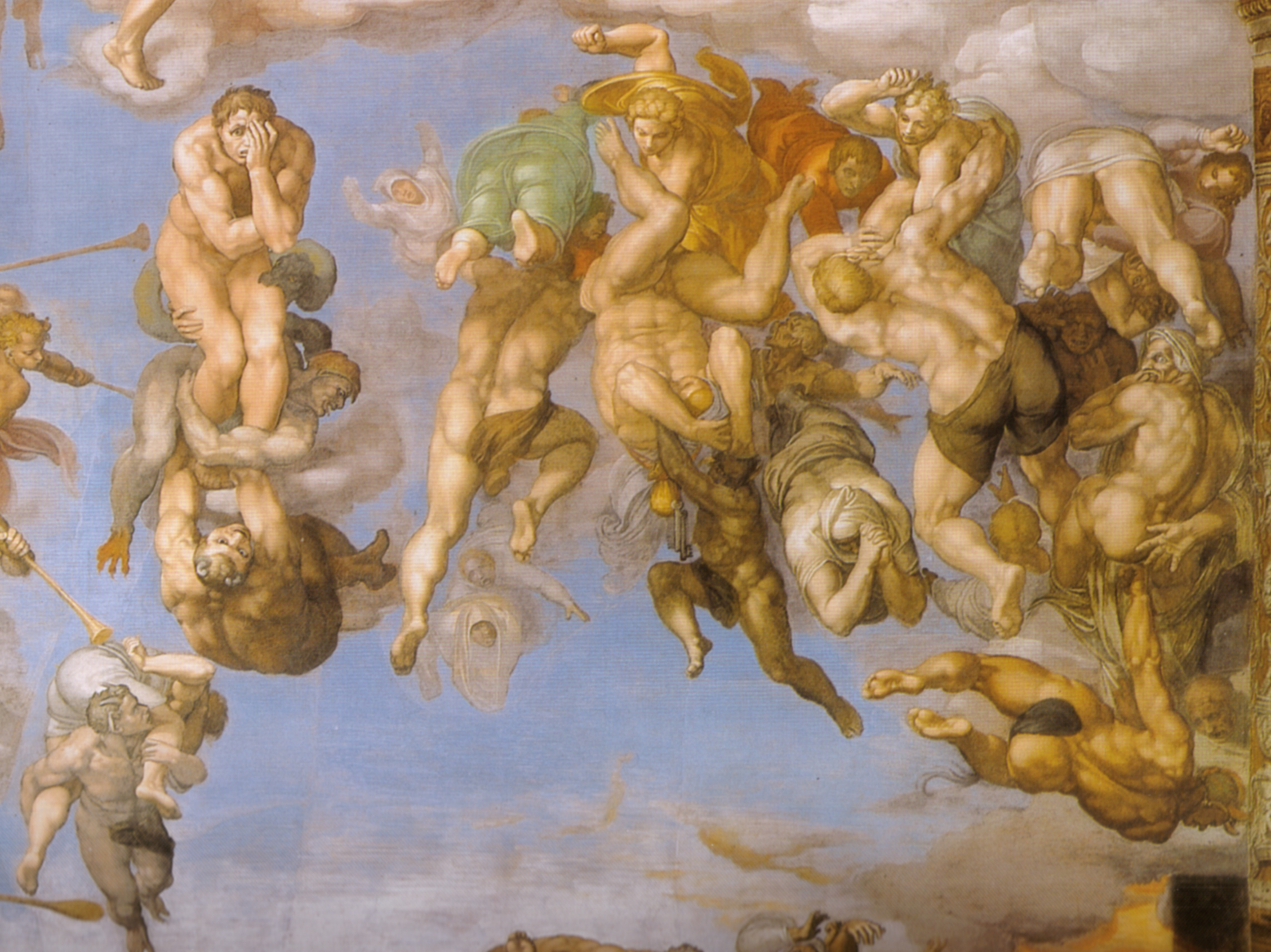
The damned in the air

The movements of the resurrected reflect the traditional pattern. They arise from their graves at bottom left, and some continue upwards, helped in several cases by angels in the air (mostly without wings) or others on clouds, pulling them up. Others, the damned, apparently pass over to the right, though none are quite shown doing so; there is a zone in the lower middle that is empty of persons. A boat rowed by an aggressive Charon, who ferried souls to the Underworld in classical mythology (and Dante), brings them to land beside the entrance to Hell; his threatening them with his oar is a direct borrowing from Dante. Satan, the traditional Christian devil, is not shown but another classical figure, Minos, supervises the admission of the Damned into Hell; this was his role in Dante's Inferno. He is generally agreed to have been given the features of Biagio da Cesena, a critic of Michelangelo in the Papal court.

In the centre above Charon is a group of angels on clouds, seven blowing trumpets (as in the Book of Revelation), others holding books that record the names of the Saved and Damned. To their right is a larger figure who has just realized that he is damned and appears paralyzed with horror. Two devils are pulling him downwards. To the right of this devils pull down others; some are being pushed down by angels above them.

== Choice of subject ==
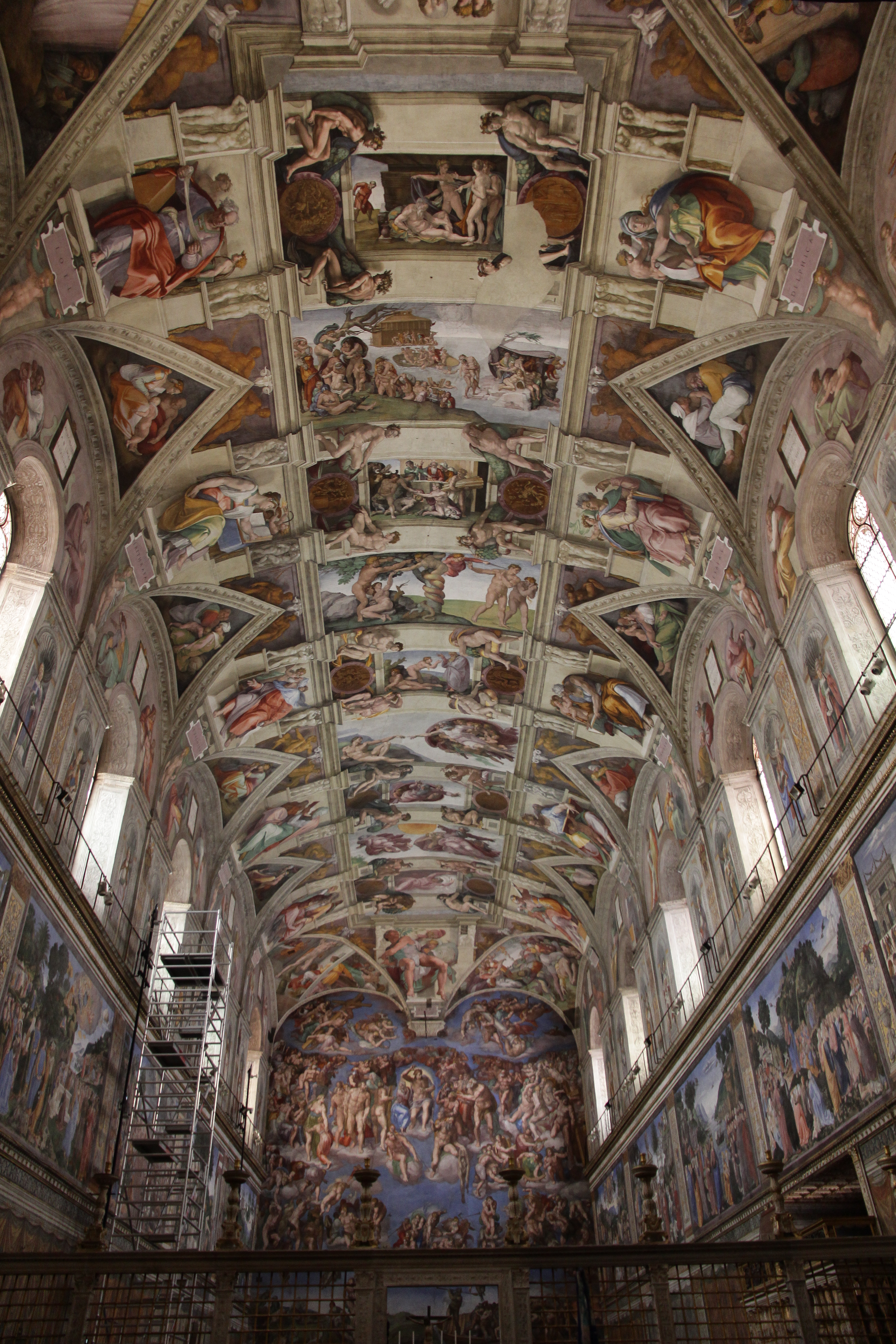
The Last Judgment at the end of the chapel

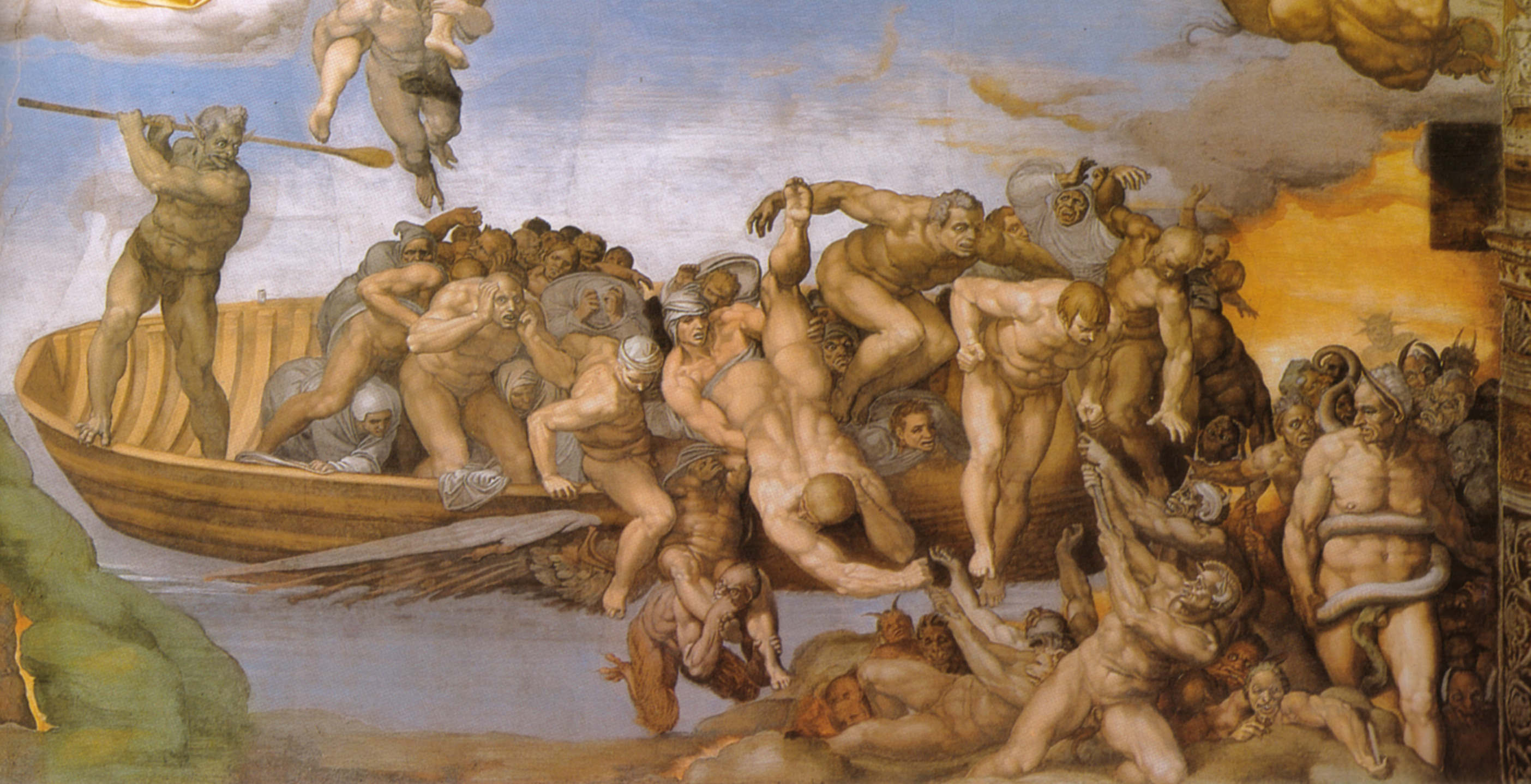
Charon and his boat of damned souls

The Last Judgment was a traditional subject for large church frescos, but it was unusual to place it at the east end, over the altar. The traditional position was on the west wall, over the main doors at the back of a church, so that the congregation took this reminder of their options away with them on leaving. It might be either painted on the interior, as for example by Giotto at the Arena Chapel, or in a sculpted tympanum on the exterior. However, a number of late medieval panel paintings, mostly altarpieces, were based on the subject with similar compositions, although adapted to a horizontal picture space. These include the Beaune Altarpiece by Rogier van der Weyden and ones by artists such as Fra Angelico, Hans Memling and Hieronymus Bosch. Many aspects of Michelangelo's composition reflect the well-established traditional Western depiction, but with a fresh and original approach.

Most traditional versions have a figure of Christ in Majesty in about the same position as Michelangelo's, and even larger than his, with a greater disproportion in scale to the other figures. As here, compositions contain large numbers of figures, divided between angels and saints around Christ at the top, and the dead being judged below. Typically there is a strong contrast between the ordered ranks of figures in the top part, and chaotic and frenzied activity below, especially on the right side that leads to Hell. The procession of the judged usually begins at the bottom (viewer's) left, as here, as the resurrected rise from their graves and move towards judgment. Some pass judgment and continue upwards to join the company in heaven, while others pass over to Christ's left hand and then downwards towards Hell in the bottom right corner (compositions had difficulty incorporating Purgatory visually). The damned may be shown naked, as a mark of their humiliation as devils carry them off, and sometimes the newly resurrected too, but angels and those in Heaven are fully dressed, their clothing a main clue to the identity of groups and individuals.

== Before starting ==
The project was a long time in gestation. It was probably first proposed in 1533, but was not then attractive to Michelangelo. A number of letters and other sources describe the original subject as a "Resurrection", but it seems most likely that this was always meant in the sense of the General Resurrection of the Dead, followed in Christian eschatology by the Last Judgment, rather than the Resurrection of Jesus. Other scholars believe there was indeed a substitution of the more sombre final subject, reflecting the emerging mood of the Counter-Reformation, and an increase in the area of the wall to be covered. A number of Michelangelo's drawings from the early 1530s develop a Resurrection of Jesus.

Vasari, alone among contemporary sources, says that originally Michelangelo intended to paint the other end wall with a Fall of the Rebel Angels to match. By April 1535 the preparation of the wall was begun, but it was over a year before painting began. Michelangelo stipulated the filling-in of two narrow windows, the removal of three cornices, and building the surface increasingly forward as it rises, to give a single uninterrupted wall surface slightly leaning out, by about 11 inches over the height of the fresco.

The preparation of the wall led to the end of more than twenty years of friendship between Michelangelo and Sebastiano del Piombo, who tried to persuade the Pope and Michelangelo to do the painting in his preferred technique of oil on plaster, and managed to get the smooth plaster finish needed for this applied. It is possible that around this stage the idea was floated that Sebastiano would do the actual painting, to Michelangelo's designs, as they had collaborated nearly 20 years earlier. After, according to Vasari, some months of passivity, Michelangelo furiously insisted that it should be in fresco, and had the wall re-plastered in the rough arriccio needed as a base for fresco. It was on this occasion that he famously said that oil painting was "an art for women and for leisurely and idle people like Fra Sebastiano".

The new fresco required, unlike his Sistine Chapel ceiling, considerable destruction of existing art. There was an altarpiece of the Assumption of Mary by Pietro Perugino above the altar, for which a drawing survives in the Albertina, flanked by tapestries to designs by Raphael; these, of course, could just be used elsewhere. Above this zone, there were two paintings from the 15th-century cycles of Moses and Christ which still occupy the middle zone of the side walls. These were probably Perugino's Finding of Moses and the Adoration of the Kings, beginning both cycles. Above them were the first of the series of standing popes in niches, including Saint Peter himself, probably as well as a Saint Paul and a central figure of Christ. Finally, the project required the destruction of two lunettes with the first two Ancestors of Christ from Michelangelo's own ceiling scheme. However, some of these works may have already been damaged by an accident in April 1525, when the altar curtains went on fire; the damage done to the wall is unclear.

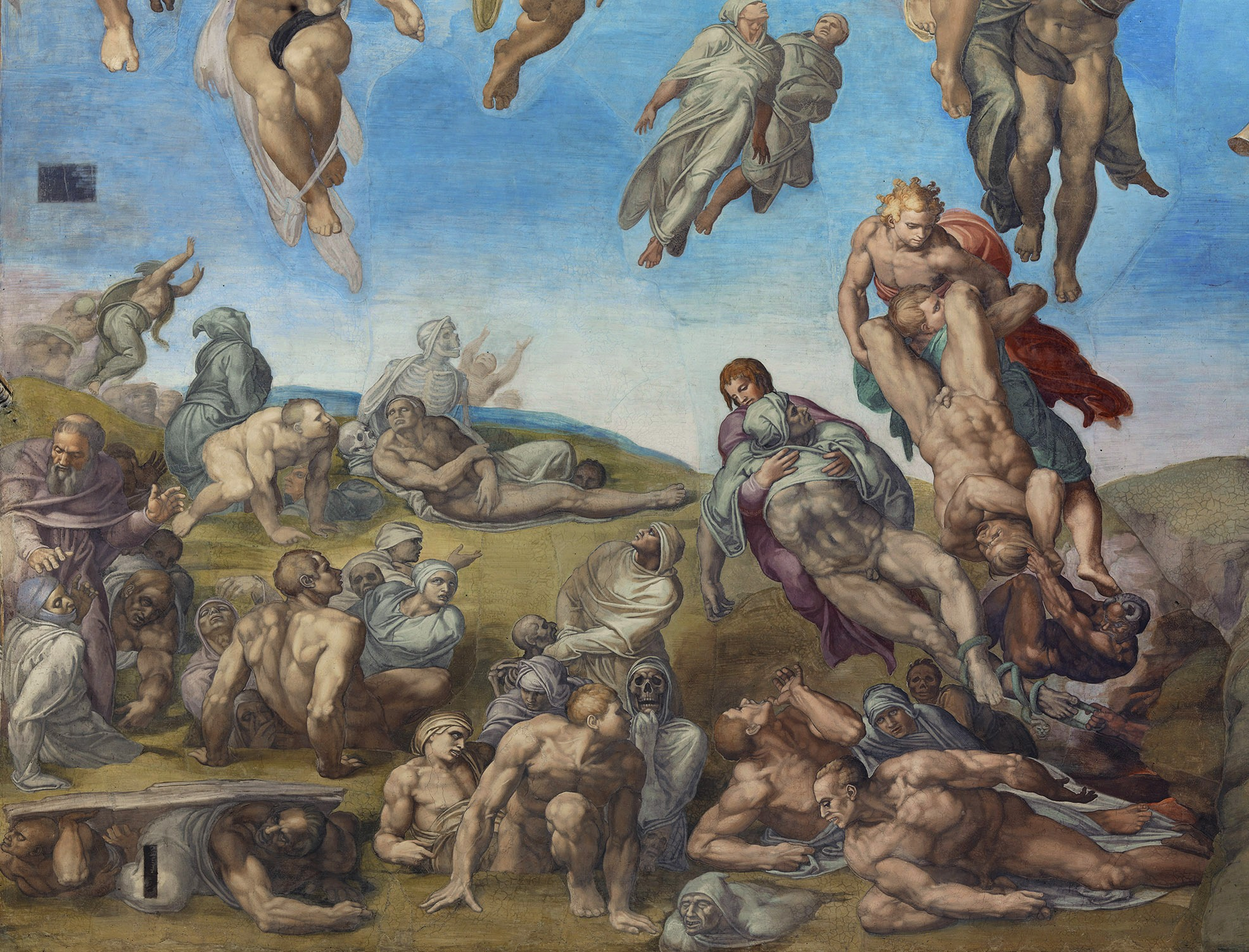
The Resurrection of the Dead

The structure of the chapel, built in a great hurry in the 1470s, had given trouble from the start, with frequent cracks appearing. At Christmas in 1525 a Swiss Guard was killed while entering the chapel with the pope when the stone lintel to the doorway split and fell on him. The site is on sandy soil, draining a large area, and the preceding "Great Chapel" had had similar problems.

The new scheme for the altar wall and other changes necessitated by structural problems led to a loss of symmetry and "continuity of window-rhythms and cornices", as well as some of the most important parts of the previous iconographical schemes. As shown by drawings, the initial conception for the Last Judgment was to leave the existing altarpiece and work round it, stopping the composition below the frescos of Moses and Christ.

The Sistine Chapel was dedicated to the Assumption of the Virgin, which had been the subject of Perugino's altarpiece. Once it was decided to remove this, it appears that a tapestry of the Coronation of the Virgin, a subject often linked to the Assumption, was commissioned, which was hung above the altar for important liturgical occasions in the 18th century, and perhaps from the 1540s until then. The tapestry has a vertical format (it is 4.3 by 3 metres (14.1 by 9.8 ft)) and is still in the Vatican Museums. A print of 1582 shows the chapel in use, with a large cloth of roughly this shape hanging behind the altar, and a canopy over it. The cloth is shown as plain, but the artist also omits the paintings below the ceiling, and may well not have been present himself, but working from prints and descriptions.

== Reception and later changes ==
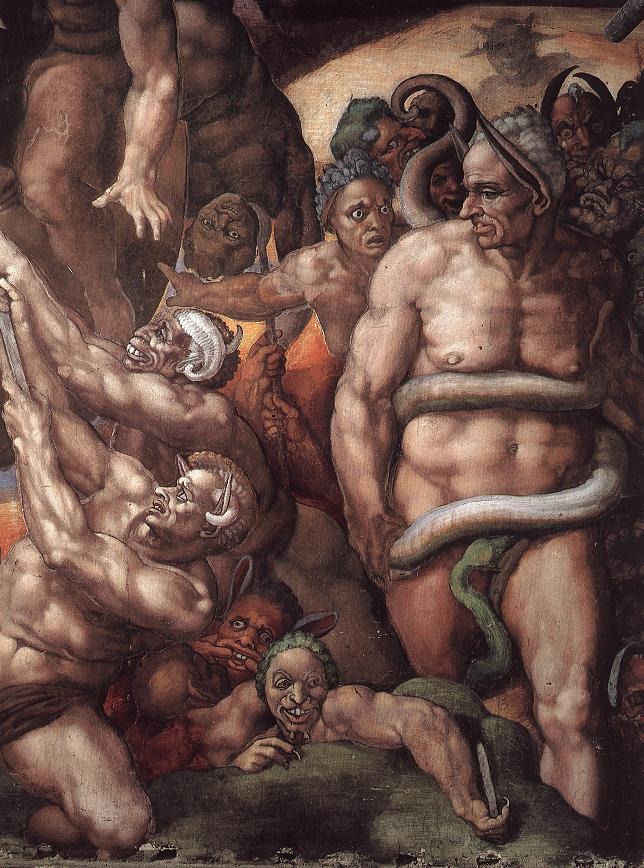
Group of the damned, with Biagio da Cesena as Minos at right

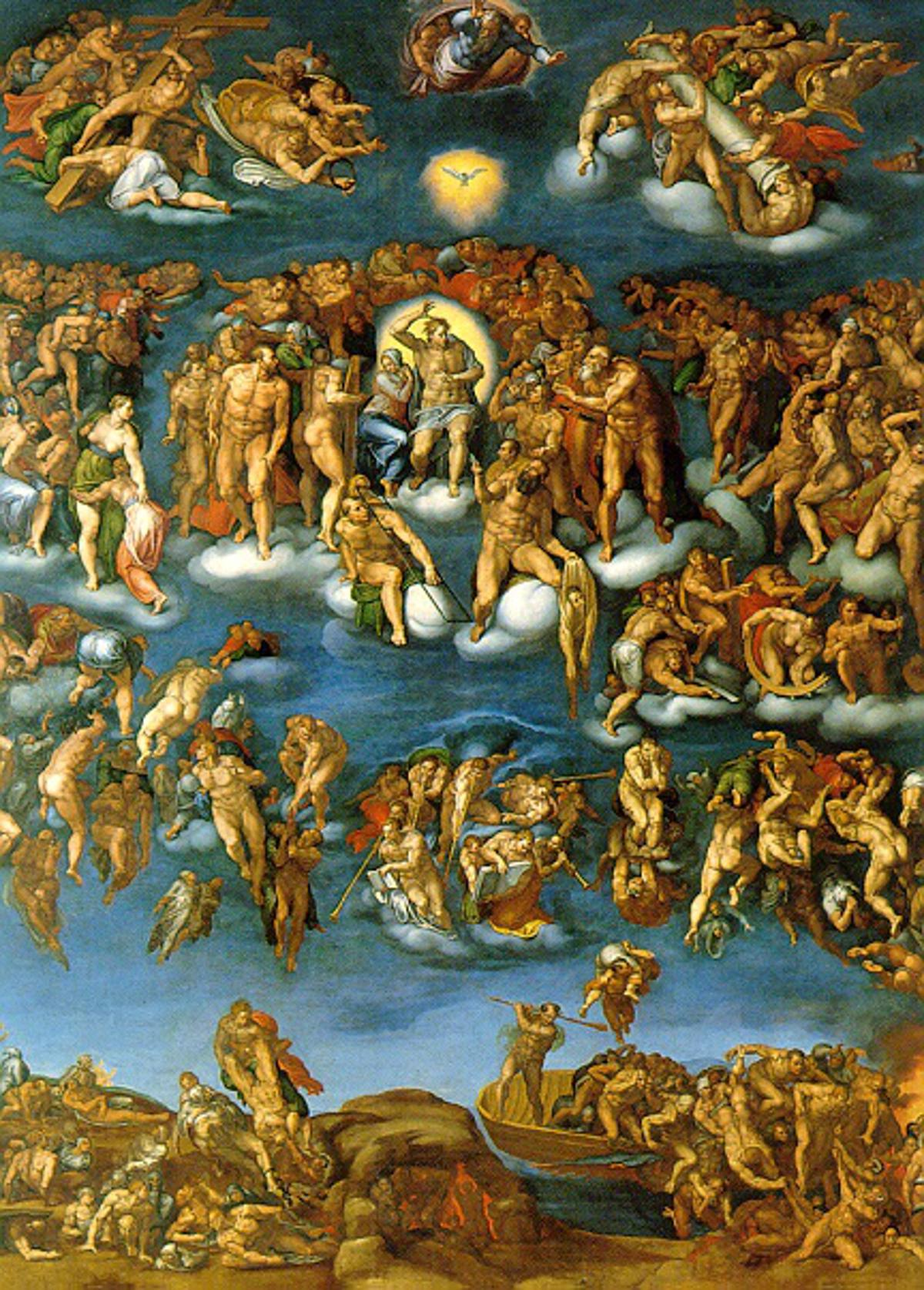
1549 copy of the still unretouched mural by Marcello Venusti (Museo di Capodimonte, Naples).

=== Religious objections ===
The Last Judgment became controversial as soon as it was seen, with disputes between critics in the Catholic Counter-Reformation and supporters of the genius of the artist and the style of the painting. Michelangelo was accused of being insensitive to proper decorum, in respect of nudity and other aspects of the work, and of pursuing artistic effect over following the scriptural description of the event.

On a preview visit with Paul III, before the work was complete, the pope's Master of Ceremonies Biagio da Cesena is reported by Vasari as saying that: "it was most disgraceful that in so sacred a place there should have been depicted all those nude figures, exposing themselves so shamefully, and that it was no work for a papal chapel but rather for the public baths and taverns". Michelangelo immediately worked Cesena's face from memory into the scene as Minos, judge of the underworld (far bottom-right corner of the painting) with donkey ears (i.e. indicating foolishness), while his nudity is covered by a coiled snake. It is said that when Cesena complained to the Pope, the pontiff joked that his jurisdiction did not extend to Hell, so the portrait would have to remain. Pope Paul III himself was attacked by some for commissioning and protecting the work, and came under pressure to alter if not entirely remove the Last Judgment, which continued under his successors.

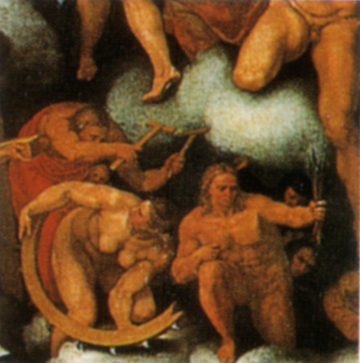
Marcello Venusti's copy; detail showing an uncensored version of Saint Catherine at the bottom left and Saint Blaise above her with a different head position

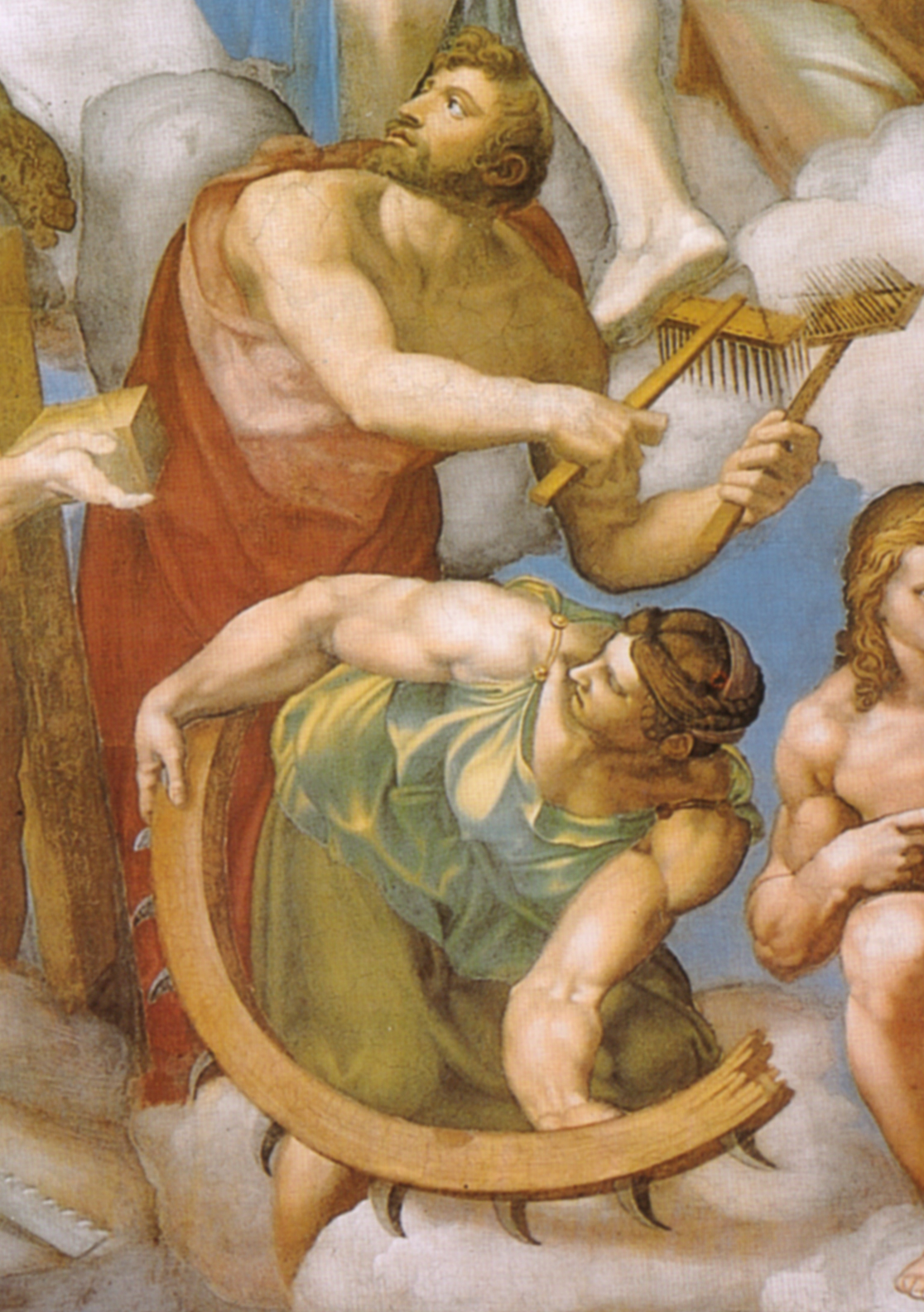
Daniele da Volterra's repainted versions of Saint Catherine and Saint Blaise

There were objections to the mixing of figures from pagan mythology into depictions of Christian subject matter. Besides the figures of Charon and Minos and wingless angels, the very classicized Christ was suspect: beardless Christs had in fact only finally disappeared from Christian art some four centuries earlier, but Michelangelo's figure is unmistakably Apollonian.

Further objections related to failures to follow the scriptural references. The angels blowing trumpets are all in one group, whereas in the Book of Revelation they are sent to "the four corners of the earth". Christ is not seated on a throne, contrary to Scripture. Such draperies as Michelangelo painted are often shown as blown by wind, but it was claimed that all weather would cease on the Day of Judgment. The resurrected are in mixed condition, some skeletons but most appearing with their flesh intact. All these objections were eventually collected in a book, the Due Dialogi published just after Michelangelo's death in 1564, by the Dominican theologian Giovanni Andrea Gilio (da Fabriano), who had become one of several theologians policing art during and after the Council of Trent. As well as theological objections, Gilio objected to artistic devices like foreshortening that puzzled or distracted untrained viewers. The copy by Marcello Venusti added the dove of the Holy Spirit above Christ, perhaps in response to Gilio's complaint that Michelangelo should have shown all the Trinity.

Two decades after the fresco was completed, the final session of the Council of Trent in 1563 finally enacted a form of words that reflected the Counter-Reformation attitudes to art that had been growing in strength in the Church for some decades. The council's decree (drafted at the last minute and generally very short and inexplicit) reads in part:

Every superstition shall be removed, ... all lasciviousness be avoided; in such wise that figures shall not be painted or adorned with a beauty exciting to lust, ... there be nothing seen that is disorderly, or that is unbecomingly or confusedly arranged, nothing that is profane, nothing indecorous, seeing that holiness becometh the house of God. And that these things may be the more faithfully observed, the holy Synod ordains, that no one be allowed to place, or cause to be placed, any unusual image, in any place, or church, howsoever exempted, except that image have been approved of by the bishop.

There was an explicit decree that: "The pictures in the Apostolic Chapel should be covered over, and those in other churches should be destroyed, if they display anything that is obscene or clearly false".

The defences by Vasari and others of the painting evidently made some impact on clerical thinking. In 1573, when Paolo Veronese was summoned before the Venetian Inquisition to justify his inclusion of "buffoons, drunken Germans, dwarfs, and other such absurdities" in what was then called a painting of the Last Supper (later renamed as The Feast in the House of Levi), he tried to implicate Michelangelo in a comparable breach of decorum, but was promptly rebuffed by the inquisitors, as the transcript records:
Q. Does it seem suitable to you, in the Last Supper of our Lord, to represent buffoons, drunken Germans, dwarfs, and other such absurdities?
A. Certainly not.
Q. Then why have you done it?
A. I did it on the supposition that those people were outside the room in which the Supper was taking place.
Q. Do you not know that in Germany and other countries infested by heresy, it is habitual, by means of pictures full of absurdities, to vilify and turn to ridicule the things of the Holy Catholic Church, in order to teach false doctrine to ignorant people who have no common sense?
A. I agree that it is wrong, but I repeat what I have said, that it is my duty to follow the examples given me by my masters.
Q. Well, what did your masters paint? Things of this kind, perhaps?
A. In Rome, in the Pope's Chapel, Michelangelo has represented Our Lord, His Mother, Saint John, Saint Peter, and the celestial court; and he has represented all these personages nude, including the Virgin Mary [this last not true], and in various attitudes not inspired by the most profound religious feeling.
Q. Do you not understand that in representing the Last Judgment, in which it is a mistake to suppose that clothes are worn, there was no reason for painting any? But in these figures what is there that is not inspired by the Holy Spirit? There are neither buffoons, dogs, weapons, nor other absurdities. ...

=== Revisions ===
Some action to meet the criticism and enact the decision of the council had become inevitable, and the genitalia in the fresco were painted over with drapery by the Mannerist painter Daniele da Volterra, probably mostly after Michelangelo died in 1564. Daniele was "a sincere and fervent admirer of Michelangelo" who kept his changes to a minimum, and had to be ordered to go back and add more, and for his trouble got the nickname "Il Braghettone", meaning "the breeches maker". He also chiseled away and entirely repainted the larger part of Saint Catherine and the entire figure of Saint Blaise behind her. This was done because in the original version Blaise had appeared to look at Catherine's naked behind, and because to some observers the position of their bodies suggested sexual intercourse. The repainted version shows Blaise looking away from Saint Catherine, upward towards Christ.

His work, beginning in the upper parts of the wall, was interrupted when Pope Pius IV died in December 1565 and the chapel needed to be free of scaffolding for the funeral and conclave to elect the next pope. El Greco had made a helpful offer to repaint the entire wall with a fresco that was "modest and decent, and no less well painted than the other". Further campaigns of overpainting, often "less discreet or respectful", followed in later reigns, and "the threat of total destruction ... re-surfaced in the pontificates of Pius V, Gregory XIII, and probably again of Clement VIII". According to Anthony Blunt, "rumours were current in 1936 that Pius XI intended to continue the work". In total, nearly 40 figures had drapery added, apart from the two repainted. These additions were in "dry" fresco, which made them easier to remove in the most recent restoration (1990–1994), when about 15 were removed, from those added after 1600. It was decided to leave 16th-century changes.

At a relatively early date, probably in the 16th century, a strip of about 18 inches was lost across the whole width of the bottom of the fresco, as the altar and its backing was modified.

By the nineteenth century, the earlier moral controversy surrounding the fresco's nudity had largely lost its urgency, while its extraordinary formal complexity continued to challenge artists attempting to reproduce or reinterpret it. Among these later responses was the large charcoal drawing executed in 1883–1884 by Francesco Di Bartolo, intended for an etching that could not be carried out because of the limited financial resources of the Regia Calcografia.

=== Artistic criticism ===
==== Contemporary ====
As well as the criticism on moral and religious grounds, there was from the start considerable criticism based on purely aesthetic considerations, which had hardly been seen at all in initial reactions to Michelangelo's Sistine Chapel ceiling. Two key figures in the first wave of criticism were Pietro Aretino and his friend Lodovico Dolce, a prolific Venetian humanist. Aretino had made considerable efforts to become as close to Michelangelo as he was to Titian, but had always been rebuffed; "in 1545 his patience gave way, and he wrote to Michelangelo that letter on the Last Judgement which is now famous as an example of insincere prudishness", a letter written with a view to publication. Aretino had not in fact seen the finished painting, and based his criticisms on one of the prints that had been quickly brought to market. He "purports to represent the simple folk" in this new wider audience. However, it appears that at least the print-buying public preferred the uncensored version of the paintings, as most prints showed this well into the 17th century.

Vasari responded to this and other criticisms in the 1st edition of his Life of Michelangelo in 1550. Dolce followed up in 1557, the year after Aretino died, with a published dialogue, L'Aretino, almost certainly a collaborative effort with his friend. Many of the arguments of the theologian critics are repeated, but now in the name of decorum rather than religion, emphasizing that the particular and very prominent location of the fresco made the amount of nudity unacceptable; a convenient argument for Aretino, some of whose projects were frankly pornographic, but intended for private audiences. Dolce also complains that Michelangelo's female figures are hard to distinguish from males, and his figures show "anatomical exhibitionism", criticisms many have echoed.

On these points, a long-lasting rhetorical comparison of Michelangelo and Raphael developed, in which even supporters of Michelangelo such as Vasari participated. Raphael is held up as the exemplar of all the grace and decorum found lacking in Michelangelo, whose outstanding quality was called by Vasari his terribiltà, the awesome, sublime or (the literal meaning) terror-inducing quality of his art. Vasari came to partly share this view by the time of the expanded 2nd edition of his Lives, published in 1568, though he explicitly defended the fresco on several points raised by the attackers (without mentioning them), such as the decorum of the fresco and "amazing diversity of the figures", and asserted it was "directly inspired by God", and a credit to the Pope and his "future renown".

==== Modern ====
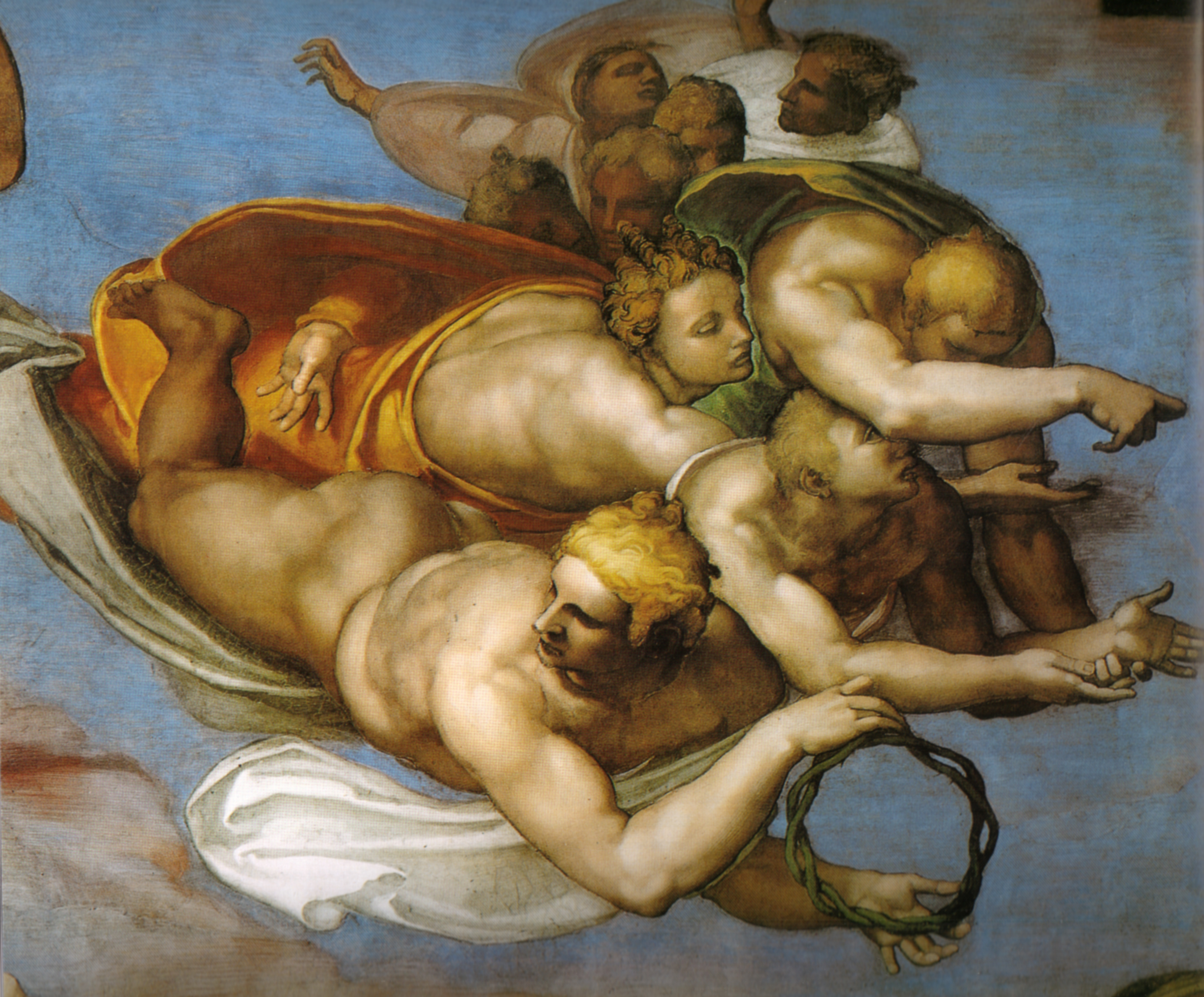
Angels at the top left, one with the Crown of Thorns

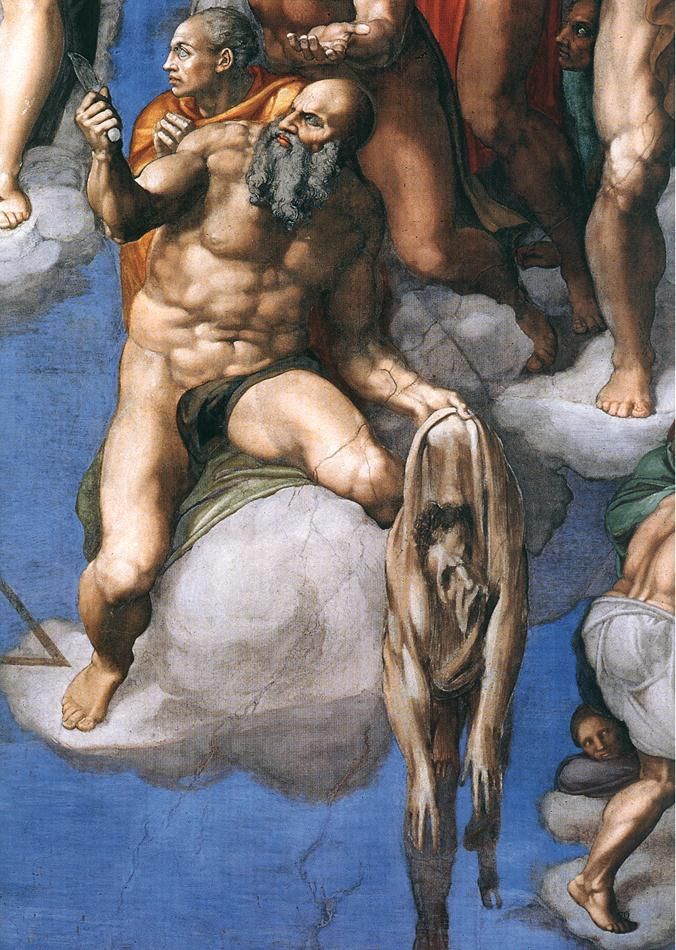
Saint Bartholomew displaying his flayed skin, with the face of Michelangelo

In many respects, modern art historians discuss the same aspects of the work as 16th-century writers: the general grouping of the figures and rendering of space and movement, the distinctive depiction of anatomy, the nudity and use of colour, and sometimes the theological implications of the fresco. However, Bernadine Barnes points out that no 16th-century critic echoes in the slightest the view of Anthony Blunt that: "This fresco is the work of a man shaken out of his secure position, no longer at ease with the world, and unable to face it directly. Michelangelo does not now deal directly with the visible beauty of the physical world." At the time, continues Barnes, "it was censured as the work of an arrogant man, and it was justified as a work that made celestial figures more beautiful than natural". Many other modern critics take approaches similar to Blunt's, emphasizing Michelangelo's "tendency away from the material and towards the things of the spirit" in his last decades.

In theology, the Second Coming of Christ ended space and time. Despite this, "Michelangelo's curious representation of space", where "the characters inhabit individual spaces that cannot be combined consistently", is often commented on.

Quite apart from the question of decorum, the rendering of anatomy has been often discussed. Writing of "energy" in the nude figure, Kenneth Clark has:

The twist into depth, the struggle to escape from the here and now of the picture plane, which had always distinguished Michelangelo from the Greeks, became the dominating rhythm of his later works. That colossal nightmare, the Last Judgment, is made up of such struggles. It is the most overpowering accumulation in all art of bodies in violent movement"

Of the figure of Christ, Clark says: "Michelangelo has not tried to resist that strange compulsion which made him thicken a torso until it is almost square."

S.J. Freedberg commented that "The vast repertory of anatomies that Michelangelo conceived for the Last Judgment seems often to have been determined more by the requirements of art than by compelling needs of meaning, ... meant not just to entertain but to overpower us with their effects. Often, too, the figures assume attitudes of which a major sense is one of ornament." He notes that the two frescos in the Cappella Paolina, Michelangelo's last paintings begun in November 1542 almost immediately after the Last Judgment, show from the start a major change in style, away from grace and aesthetic effect to an exclusive concern with illustrating the narrative, with no regard for beauty.

== Restoration (1980–1994) ==
Early appreciations of the fresco had focused on the colours, especially in small details, but over the centuries the build-up of dirt on the surface had largely hidden these. The built-out wall led to extra deposition of soot from candles on the altar. In 1953 (admittedly in November) Bernard Berenson put in his diary: "The ceiling looks dark, gloomy. The Last Judgment even more so; ... how difficult to make up our minds that these Sistine frescoes are nowadays scarcely enjoyable in the original and much more so in photographs".

The fresco was restored along with the Sistine vault between 1980 and 1994 under the supervision of Fabrizio Mancinelli, the curator of post-classical collections of the Vatican Museums and Gianluigi Colalucci, head restorer at the Vatican laboratory. During the course of the restoration, about half of the censorship of the "Fig-Leaf Campaign" was removed. Numerous pieces of buried details, caught under the smoke and grime of scores of years, were revealed after the restoration. It was discovered that the fresco of Biagio de Cesena as Minos with donkey ears was being bitten in the genitalia by a coiled snake.

== Inserted self-portrait ==
Most writers agree that Michelangelo depicted his own face in the flayed skin of St. Bartholomew (see the illustration above). Edgar Wind saw this as "a prayer for redemption, that through the ugliness the outward man might be thrown off, and the inward man resurrected pure", in a Neoplatonist mood, one that Aretino detected and objected to. One of Michelangelo's poems had used the metaphor of a snake shedding its old skin for his hope for a new life after his death. Bernadine Barnes writes that "recent viewers ... have found in [the flayed skin] evidence of Michelangelo's self-doubt, since the lifeless skin is held precariously over Hell. However, no sixteenth-century critic noticed it".

The face of Saint Bartholomew and his draped skin are entirely different from each other. The bearded figure of the saint holding the skin was sometimes thought to have the features of Aretino, but open conflict between Michelangelo and Aretino did not occur until 1545, several years after the fresco's completion. "Even Aretino's good friend Vasari did not recognize him."

=== Other possible portraits ===
Scholars have attempted to identify a number of other portraits and self-portraits in the work. In the bottom left-hand corner of the fresco, the hooded skeletal figure looking directly out at the viewer (with his left hand raised to his chin) has been identified as a second deathly self-portrait. An additional - heavenly - self-portrait can be found at the top of the fresco, just to the right of the architectural console beneath Jonah's feet. Other commentators have noted that Michelangelo's altar wall appears to have been designed so that it maps to the features of a human face. Jelbert has argued that - inline with the contemporary preoccupation with intellectual puzzles (such as Hans Holbein's distorted skull in The Ambassadors, 1533) - Michelangelo intended an additional image for his Last Judgment that took the form of an audacious, hidden self-portrait. When the small, skeletal self-portrait from the bottom corner is enlarged to fill the entire altar wall, the skull merges with the forms of the fresco to suggest a face undergoing regeneration, as is the case for the Saved on the left-hand side of the fresco, who take on muscle and flesh as they rise to Heaven.

== Details ==
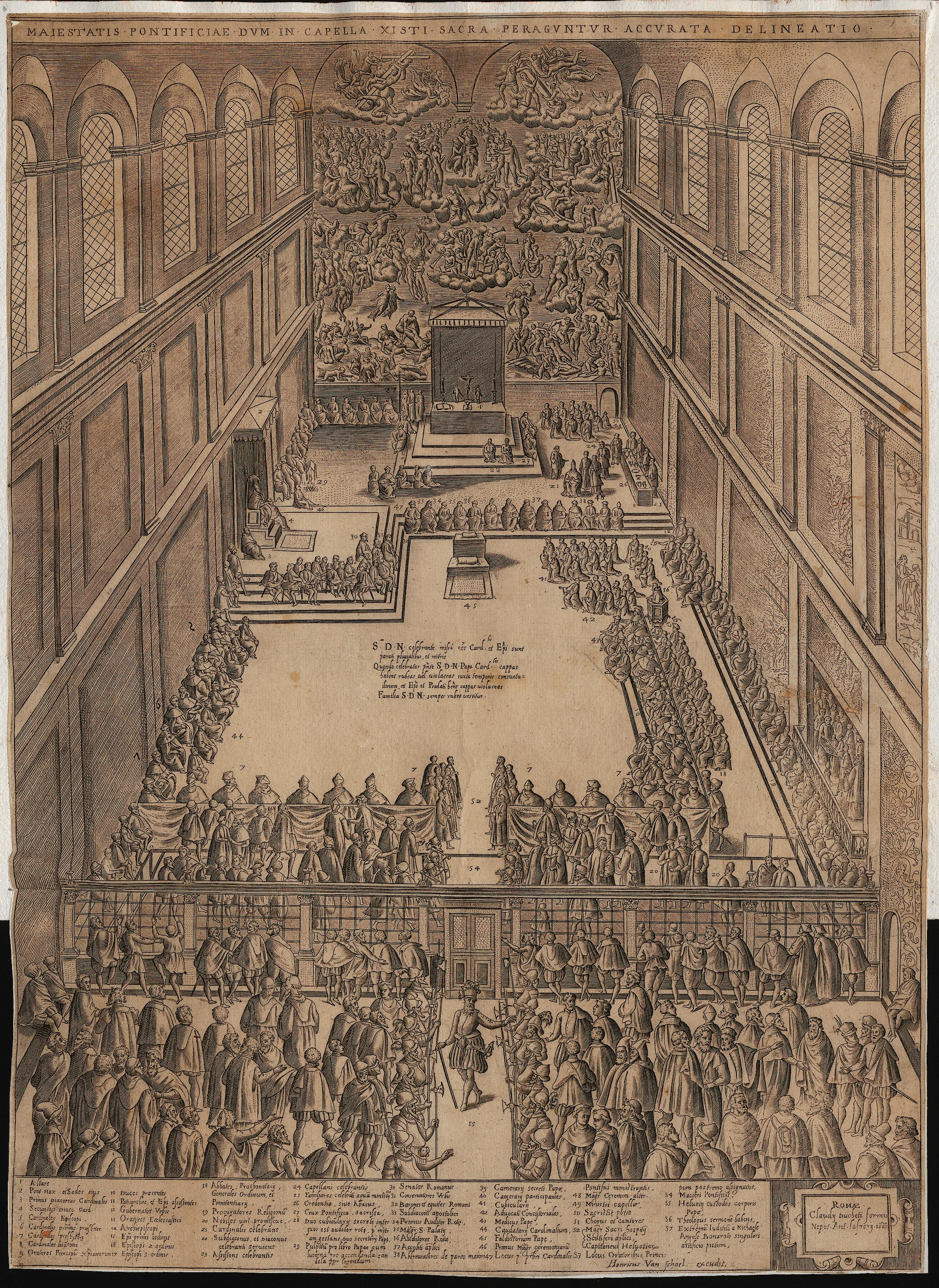
The chapel in use in 1582; note the cloth over the altar

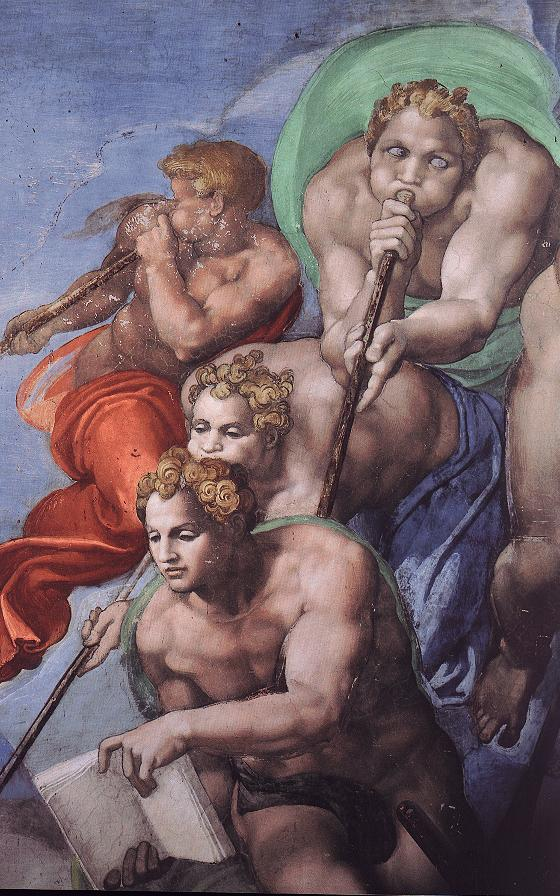
Angels, trumpeting, and one with the Book of Life

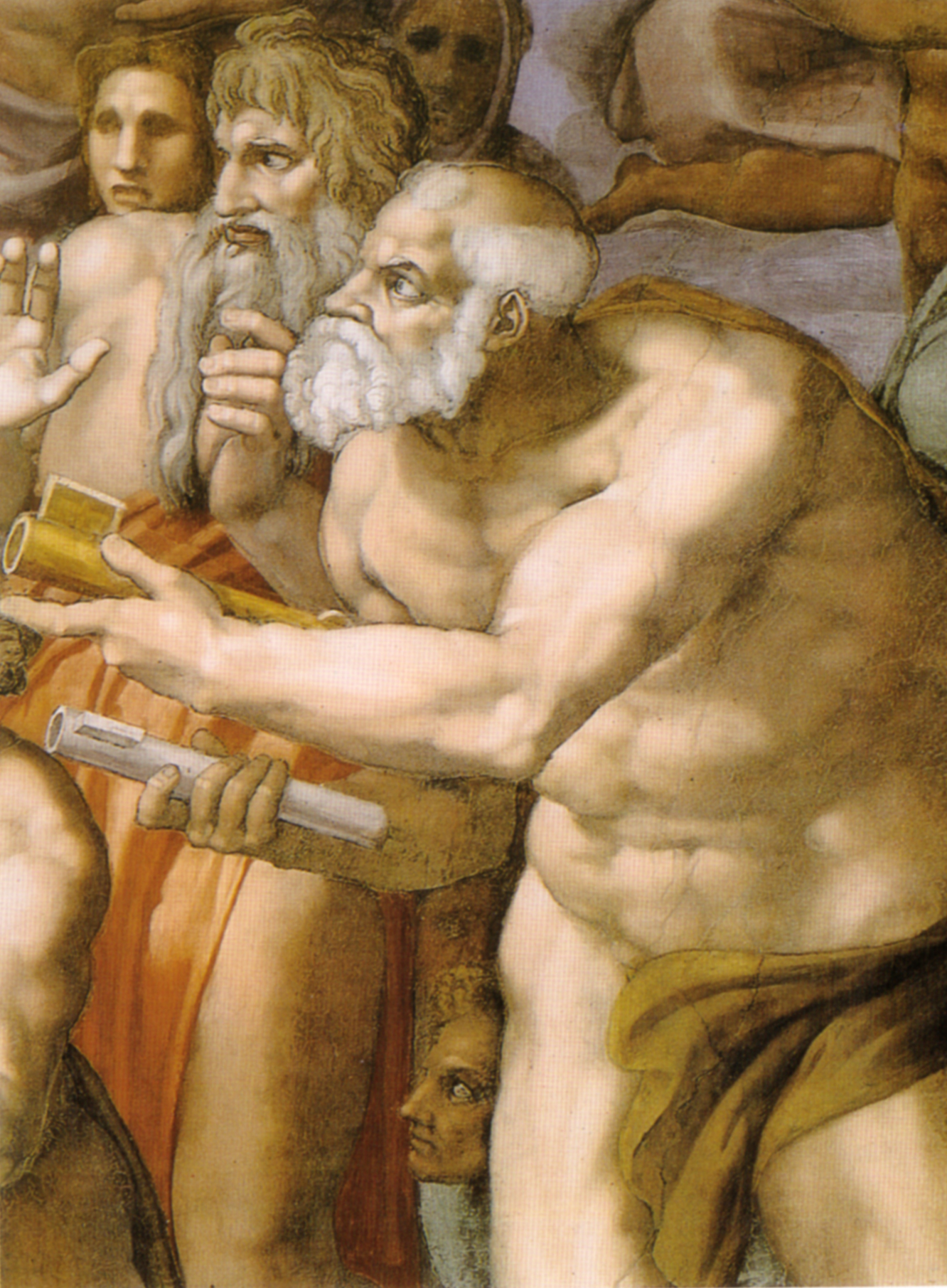
St. Peter with his keys

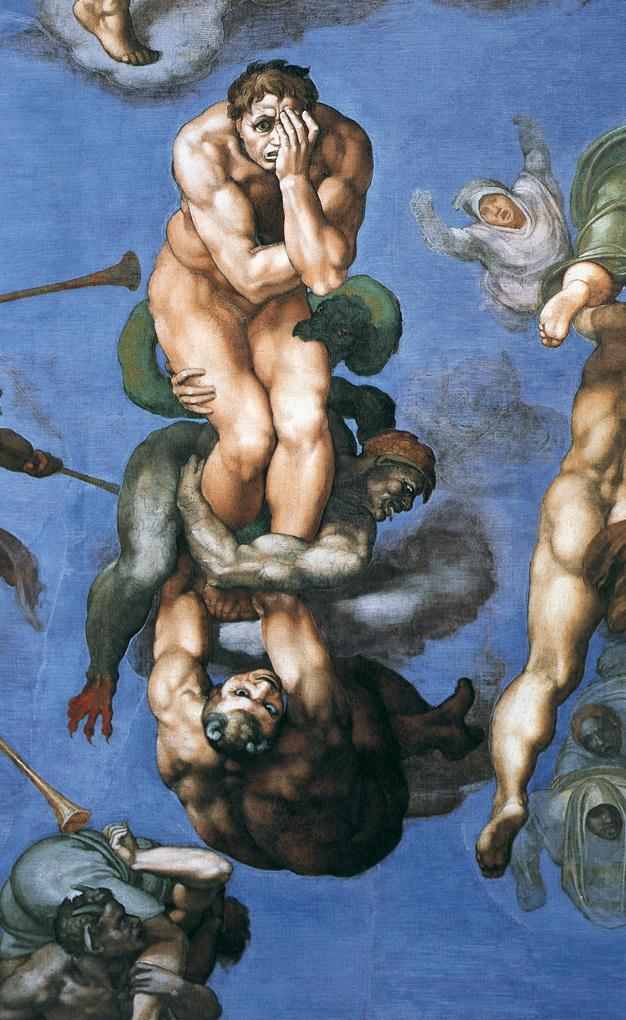
The damned soul alone

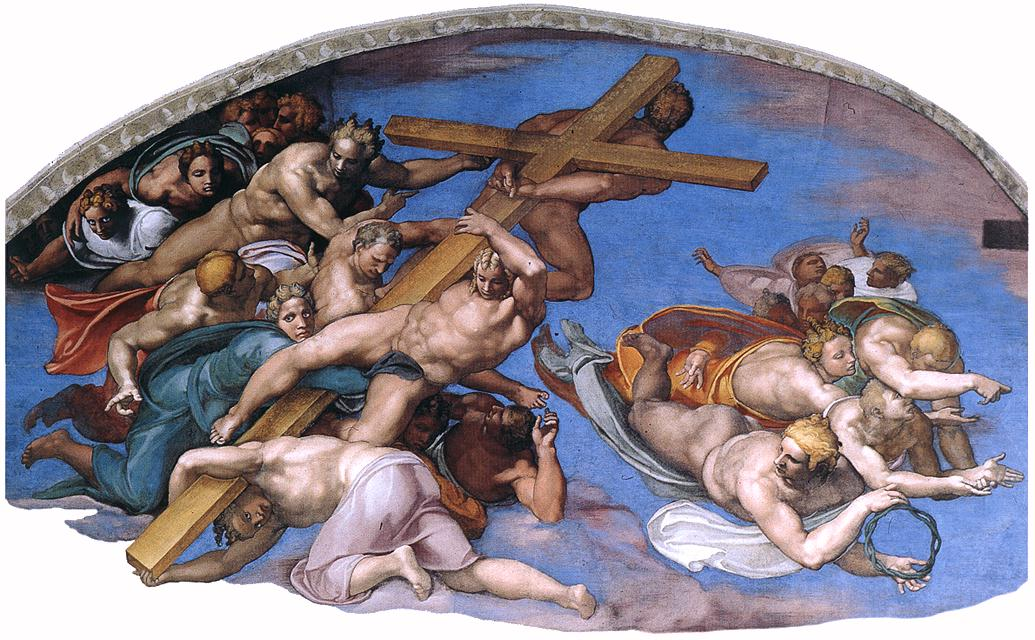
The Cross upon which Christ was crucified, top left

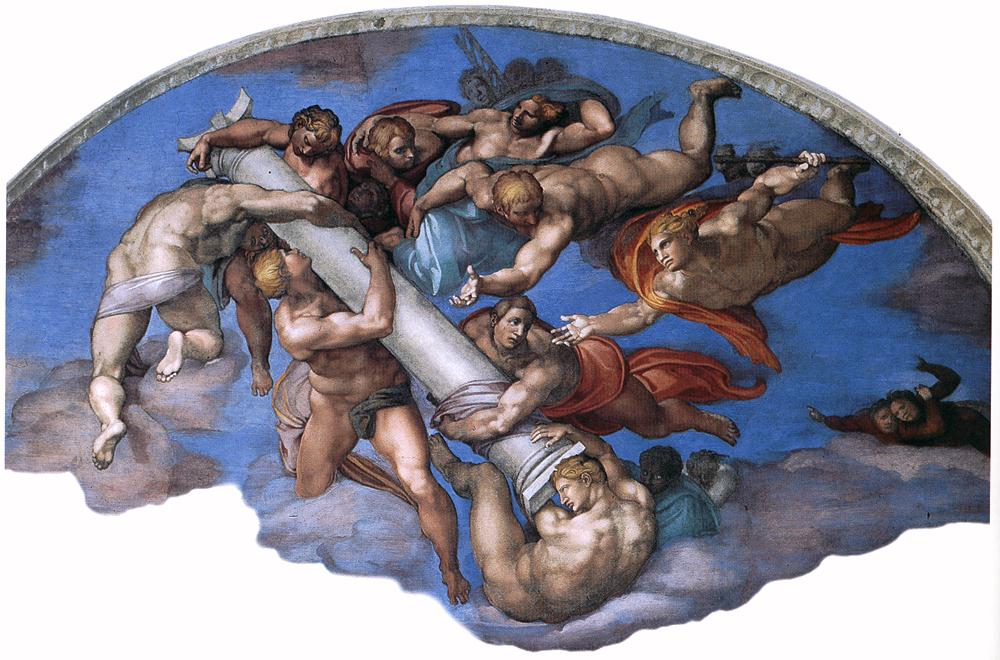
The pillar on which Christ was scourged, top right

== See also ==
- List of works by Michelangelo
- Index of Vatican City-related articles
