= Biagio da Cesena =

Italian religious official (1463–1544)

- Papal Master of Ceremonies
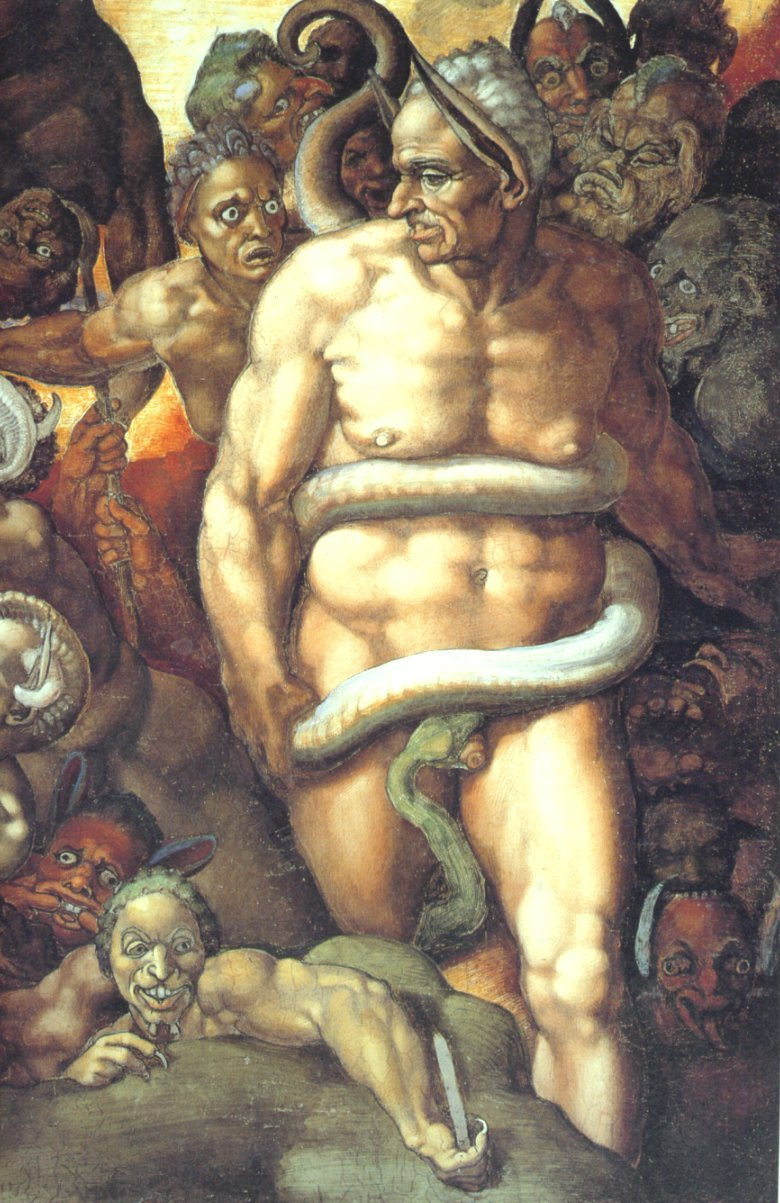
- Diocese: Rome

Personal details
- Denomination: Roman Catholic

Biagio Martinelli (Cesena 1463 – Rome 1544), better known as Biagio da Cesena (meaning "from Cesena", his native city), was a 16th-century Italian priest and Vatican official who served as Papal Master of Ceremonies. He is widely known for his negative reaction to the nude figures presented in Michelangelo's fresco of The Last Judgment in the Sistine Chapel.

In 1518, Biagio became Papal Master of Ceremonies to Pope Leo X. He would also act in this role to Popes Adrian VI, Clement VII, and Paul III.

In a story well known from the 16th century onwards, in a number of slightly different versions, Biagio is said to have complained about The Last Judgment, saying "it was disgraceful that in so sacred a place there should have been depicted all those nude figures, exposing themselves so shamefully.” Biagio went on to say that the painting was more suitable "for the public baths and taverns" than a papal chapel. In response, Michelangelo worked Biagio's face into the scene as Minos, judge of the underworld (in the far bottom-right corner of the fresco) with donkey ears (indicating foolishness), while his nudity is covered by a coiled snake biting his penis. It was widely said that when Biagio complained to Pope Paul III, the pontiff joked that his jurisdiction did not extend to hell and the portrait would have to remain.

The story is given in Vasari's Lives of the Artists, and expanded in his 2nd edition. But Vasari does not mention the Pope's response. This was first reported by Lodovico Domenichi. However, it was often added to Vasari's text in later editions of his book.
