= Sevillian school of sculpture =

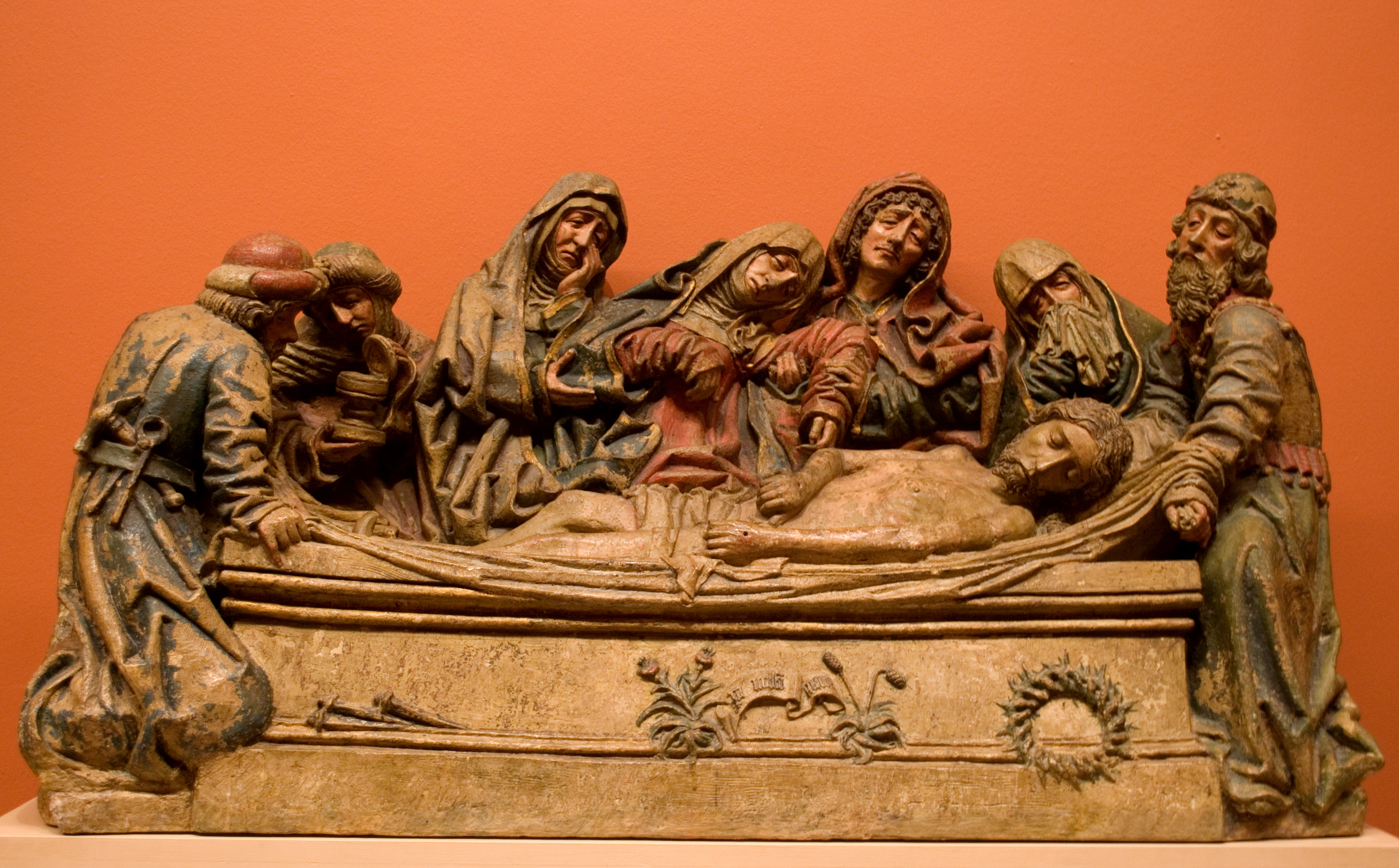
Llanto sobre Cristo Muerto ("Lament Over the Dead Christ"), by Pedro Millán, Museum of Fine Arts of Seville.

The Sevillian school of sculpture—the tradition of Christian religious sculpture in Seville, Andalusia, Spain—began in the 13th century, formed a clear tradition of its own in the 16th century, and continues into the present. The sculptures are generally worked in wood in a technique known as encarnación.

== The conquest of Seville by Ferdinand III of Castile ==
During the Reconquista, Seville was taken by Ferdinand III of Castile in 1248. From that time, both sculptures in the then-current Gothic style and sculptors working in that style began arriving in the city, the Romanesque influences were also still present. The Gothic influences came particularly from France, which also had important influence in other cultural, political, and religious respects. Among the sculptures that date from this time are the Virgen de la Sede ("Virgin of the [Ecclesiastical] Seat," that is, of the Cathedral of Seville), the Virgen de las Batallas ("Virgin of the Battles", also in the cathedral) and the Virgen de los Reyes ("Virgin of the Kings"), patroness of the city, whose clothing, hair, and articulation to allow movement would spawn many imitations.

Important works in the following century included the crucified Saint Peter in Sanlúcar la Mayor and the Virgen de los Milagros ("Virgin of the Miracles") in the La Rábida Monastery.

== 15th century: Dutch and Burgundian influence ==
The late 15th century brought significant developments for sculpture in Seville. The influence of the early 15th century Dutch sculptor Claus Sluter arrived by way of Burgundy, where Dutch painter Jan van Eyck was working in the court of Duke Philip the Good. Lorenzo Mercadante, working in the Seville Cathedral, created a series of marble and terracotta sculptures representing this aesthetic. Pedro Millán carried on this tradition, and was its most important exponent in Seville, creating such works as the Virgen del Pilar ("Virgin of the Pillar") at the cathedral—with iconography distinct from the Aragonese iconography of the time—and the groups Varón de Dolores ("Man of Sorrows") and Llanto sobre Cristo muerto ("Lament Over the Dead Christ", pictured above), now in the Museum of Fine Arts of Seville. The great altarpiece of the Seville Cathedral is architecturally Gothic; over the course of a century it acquired thousands of figures arranged in various sacred stories, created by important artists, and which are worked with utmost care even when they are placed very far up in the structure.

== 16th century: Prosperity ==
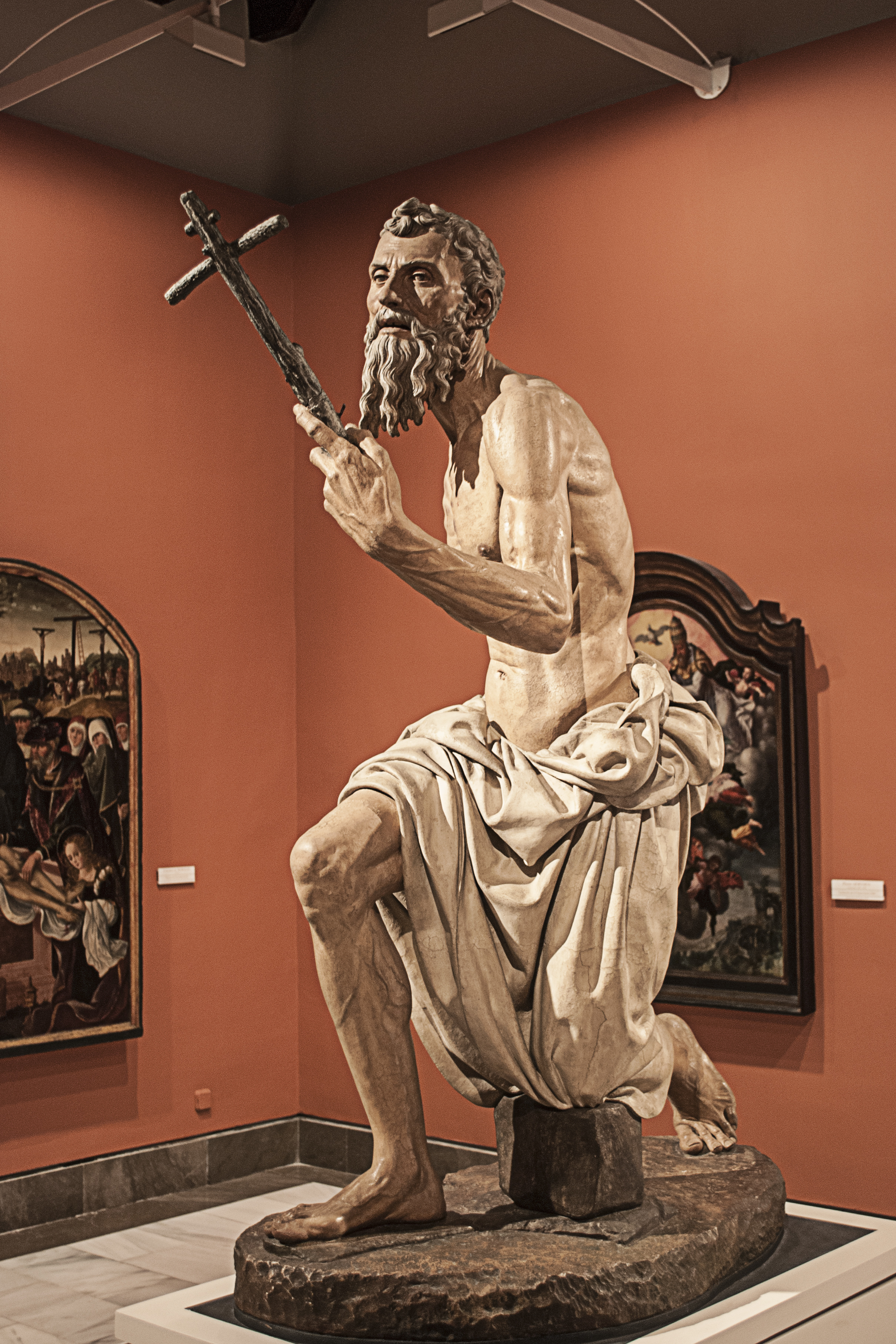
Saint Jerome Penitent, (c. 1528), original by Pietro Torrigiani, Museum of Fine Arts of Seville.

With a monopoly on Spanish trade with the West Indies, Seville saw a great influx of wealth. This wealth drew Italian artists such as Pietro Torrigiano, classmate rival of Michelangelo in the garden of the Medici. Torrigiano executed magnificent sculptures at the monastery of Saint Jerome and elsewhere in Seville, as well as important tombs and other works, which brought the influence of the Italian Renaissance and of humanism to Seville. French and Flemish sculptors such as Roque Balduque arrived as well, bringing with them a tradition of a greater realism. The classicist tradition from Italy with its ideals of beauty and the northern tradition with a greater emphasis on expression combined to create the atmosphere of sculpture in Seville in the first two thirds of the 16th century. To these would later be added the mannerism characteristic of the era.

Isidro de Villoldo, who had collaborated with Alonso Berruguete to produce the choir stalls of the Cathedral of Toledo, and who had also done important work in Castile, arrived to sculpt the main altarpiece of the charterhouse of the Monastery of Santa Maria de las Cuevas. However, he died suddenly, leaving the project unfinished. The distinguished Salamancan sculptor Juan Bautista Vázquez the Elder continued the project, aided by several others including his son Juan Bautista Vázquez the Younger, his brother-in-law the wood sculptor Juan de Oviedo the Elder, Jerónimo Hernández, Miguel de Adán, Gaspar del Águila, and Gaspar Núñez Delgado.

Prior to this massive influx of sculptors captained by the elder Vázquez, Seville had, perhaps, primarily drawn in sculptors and influences from elsewhere. From this point, there is an unquestionable continuous tradition of sculpture specific to Seville. Furthermore, the younger Vázquez would go on to create the main altarpiece of the Monastery of Saint Jerome in Granada, where he would establish a distinct Granadan school of sculpture.

== Martínez Montañés ==
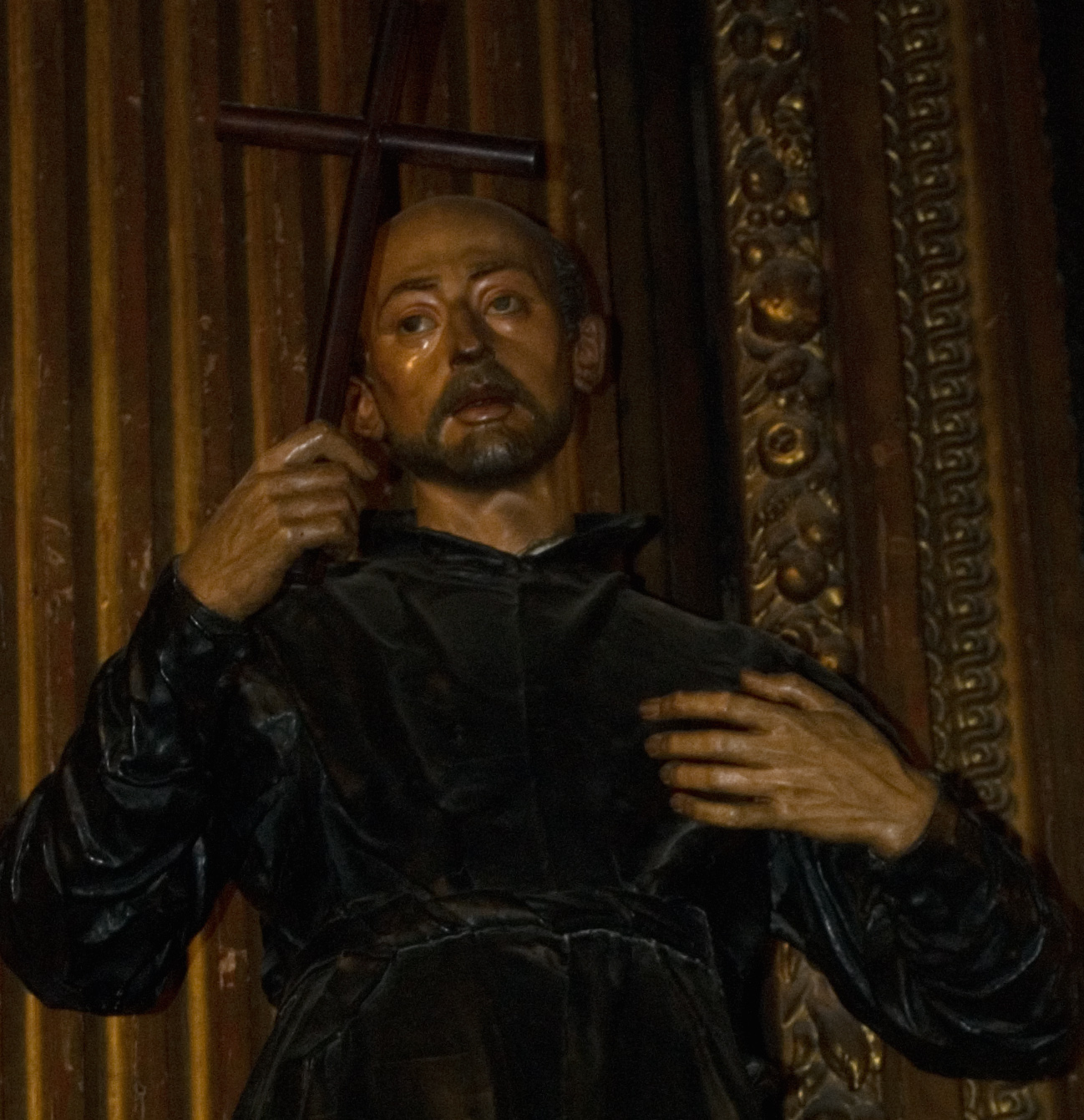
Image of Saint Ignatius of Loyola. Martínez Montañés sculpted the face and hands in 1610 at the time Ignatius was beatified. The sculpture is now in the Church of the Annunciation in Seville.

In the final quarter of the 16th century, Juan Martínez Montañés, born in Alcalá la Real (province of Jaén) made his residence in Seville; it would be his base throughout his long life and career. The greatest and most characteristic sculptor of the school of Seville, in the course of a long and fruitful career Martínez Montañés produced important altarpieces and sculptures for numerous places in Spain and the Americas. Originally a classicist, but tending later in his career toward a light Baroque, his art instantiated the views of the Council of Trent with respect to the pastoral value of sacred imagery. His polychrome sculptures in wood show an equilibrium between material and form, idea and representation; his figures at show a lighthanded realism that supports the substance of their expression. His studio was, in effect, a school for artists, and his work influenced 17th-century artists in Spain and in the Spanish colonies. Among his students were Juan de Mesa, originally from Córdoba and Alonso Cano, originally from Granada, both prominent figures in the Spanish Baroque. Mesa is known particularly for processional images for penitential confraternities, including several that are used during Holy Week in Seville. Cano became an architect, sculptor, and painter, whose works can be seen in Seville, Madrid and his native Granada; he was the originator of the Baroque era of the school of Granada.

== Evolution in the 17th century ==
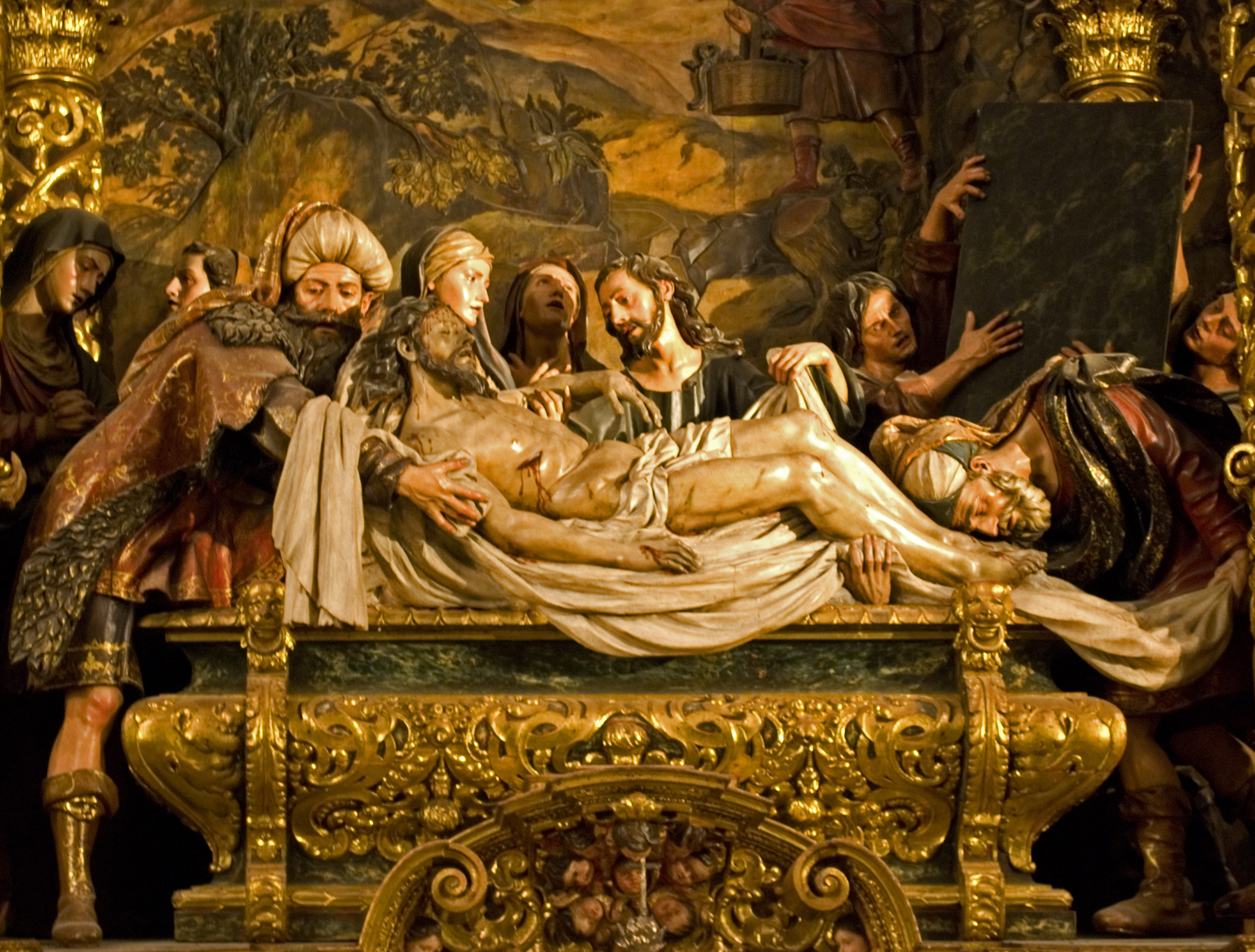
Burial of Christ by Pedro Roldán (1698), main altar of the church of the Hospital de la Caridad, Seville.

The next generation sculptors who continued the Baroque tradition in Seville after Martínez Montañés and Cano included the Cordoban brothers Francisco Dionisio de Ribas and Felipe de Ribas (though the latter did not outlive Martínez Montañés).

In the middle third of the 17th century, the Fleming Joseph Aerts settled in Seville and Castilianized his name to José de Arce. In his native land, he had been influenced by François Duquesnoy, who, in turn, was influenced by the Baroque style of Gian Lorenzo Bernini. José de Arce introduced these new influences to Andalusia, renewing the regional and local aesthetic with a new impetus toward clarity, dynamism, and chiaroscuro.

Pedro Roldán headed an important family studio that also included his daughter Luisa Roldán ("La Roldana") and his grandson Pedro Duque y Cornejo, one of the greatest Sevillian sculptors of the 18th century. They produced numerous excellent and virtuosic Baroque altarpieces, figures, choirs stalls, etc.

== Later developments ==
In the last decades of the 17th century, the work of Francisco Ruiz Gijón shows an acutely realistic Baroque style. Benito de Hita y Castillo and José Montes de Oca (the last with an aesthetic strongly influenced by Martínez Montañés) complete the era of Baroque sculpture in the 18th century.

Cristóbal Ramos, Juan and Gabriel Astorga, and Blas Molner were the leading Sevillian sculptors of the 19th century. All four worked almost exclusively as religious sculptors, providing sculptures for places of worship in Andalusia. Antonio Susillo continued the tradition into the 20th century, followed by his student Joaquín Bilbao. Later notable figures of the school of Seville are Enrique Pérez Comendador, Juan Luis Vassallo and Antonio Cano Correa.

== Principal figures of the Sevillian school of sculpture ==
=== Antecedents ===
- Lorenzo Mercadante de Bretaña (active in the second half of the 15th century)
- Pedro Millán (active 1487–1507)
- Pietro Torrigiano (1472–1522)
- Isidro de Villoldo

=== Creation of the school ===
- Juan Bautista Vázquez the Elder (1510–1588)
- Juan de Oviedo the Elder (1536–1592)
- Juan Bautista Vázquez the Younger
- Jerónimo Hernández (1540–1586)
- Miguel de Adán (1532–1610)
- Gaspar del Águila (1530–1602)
- Gaspar Núñez Delgado
- Andrés de Ocampo (1555–1625)
- Juan de Oviedo the Younger (1565–1625)

=== Splendid era ===
- Juan Martínez Montañés (1568–1649)
- Francisco de Ocampo y Felguera (1579–1639)
- Juan de Mesa (1583–1627)
- José Aertz, Castilianized as José de Arce (1600–1666)
- Pedro Roldán (1624–1699)
- María Luisa Roldán, "La Roldana", (1652–1706)

=== Later stages ===
- Francisco Ruiz Gijón (1653 – unknown)
- José Montes de Oca (1668–1754)
- Pedro Duque y Cornejo (1677–1757), grandson of Pedro Roldán
- Benito de Hita y Castillo (1714–1784)
- Cristóbal Ramos
- Los Astorga (Juan and Gabriel)
- Blas Molner
- Antonio Susillo (1857–1896)
- Joaquín Bilbao (1864–1934)
- Enrique Pérez Comendador
- Juan Luis Vassallo (1908–1986)
- Antonio Cano Correa (1909 – unknown)
- Carmen Jiménez Serrano (1920–2016)
