= Mesa (disambiguation) =

A mesa is an elevated area of land with a flat top, surrounded on all sides by steep cliffs.

Mesa or MESA may also refer to:

== Geography ==
=== Mozambique ===
- Mesa, Mozambique, a town in Cabo Delgado province

=== Spain ===
- Mesa (river), in the Sierra de Solorio range area

=== United States ===
- Mesa, Arizona, a city in Maricopa County
- Mesa, California, a census-designated place in Inyo County
- Mesa County, Colorado
  - Mesa, Colorado, an unincorporated town
- Mesa, Idaho, an unincorporated town in Adams County
- Mesa, Washington, a city in Franklin County

== Education ==
- Colorado Mesa University, a public university in Grand Junction, Colorado, United States
- Mesa Community College, a two-year college in Mesa, Arizona, United States
- Mesa County Valley School District 51, a public school district in Mesa County, Colorado, United States
- San Diego Mesa College, a two-year college in San Diego, California, United States

== People ==
- Mesa (surname)
- Mesha (Hebrew: Mēša‘), Moabite king of the 9th century BC

== Science and medicine ==
- Malaria Eradication Scientific Alliance
- Mathematics, Engineering, Science Achievement, an academic preparation program
- Maximum entropy spectral estimation, spectral density estimation method
- Methyl salicylate, chemical compound
- Multi-Ethnic Study of Atherosclerosis
- Mesa (wasp), a genus of thynnid wasp

== Technology ==
- MESA (astrophysics), open-source software for simulating stellar evolution
- Mesa (programming language)
- Mesa (computer graphics), an open-source software implementation of the OpenGL, Vulkan and other specifications
- MESA (seismic survey design software)
- Manufacturing Enterprise Solutions Association, an international association of manufacturing execution systems companies
- Mesa Boogie, also known as Mesa Engineering, an American manufacturer of guitar amplifiers
- MESA Imaging, a Swiss time-of-flight camera manufacturer
- Project MESA, a telecommunications standards collaboration
- Multi-role Electronically Scanned Array, a surveillance radar system
- Modular Equipment Stowage Assembly, a component of the Apollo Lunar Module

== Transport ==
- Mesa Air Group, an American commercial aviation holding company
- Mesa Airlines, an American regional airline

== Other uses ==
- Meṣa, a solar month in the traditional Indian calendar, and a symbol in Hindu astrology
  - Mesha Sankranti, solar New Year in the Hindu calendar
- Mesa (horse)
- Middle East Studies Association of North America
- Młoda Ekstraklasa, a Polish youth football league
- Mesa, a chain of restaurants in the United States and the Bahamas owned by chef Bobby Flay
- Mesa, home to the loose-knit community in the documentary Off the Grid: Life on the Mesa

== See also ==
- La Mesa (disambiguation)
- Mesa transistor
- Mesha (month)
