= Juan Bautista Vázquez the Elder =

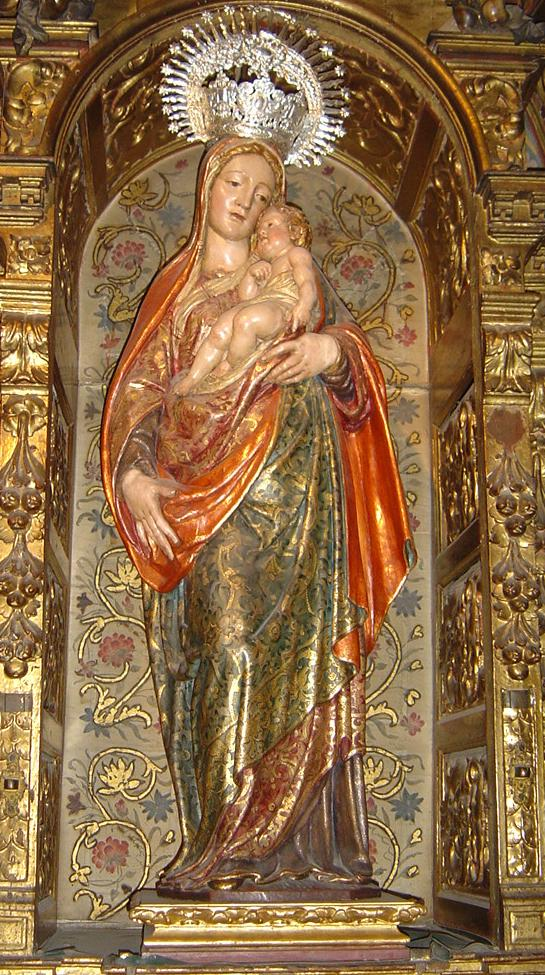
Virgin of the Fevers, Church of Saint Mary Magdalene, Seville.

Juan Bautista Vázquez el Viejo (1510 in Pelayos, province of Salamanca Castile and Leon – 12 June 1588 in Llerena, province of Badajoz, Extremadura, Spain) was a Spanish sculptor.

== Biography ==
Born in Pelayos (province of Salamanca), as a small child he moved with his family to Ávila, where the lived adjacent to the main market square. He first learned his art there in the studio of Vasco de la Zarza. It is believed that he then went to Italy, where his style became more elegant. In 1554 he moved to Toledo, where he executed various works for the Cathedral, the church of Santa María la Blanca, and the church of Almonacid de Zorita (province of Guadalajara), among others.

In 1558, Francisca Blázquez, widow of sculptor Isidro de Villoldo, brought him back to Ávila to complete the figures of the main altarpiece of the Charterhouse of Seville, which Villodo had left unfinished at his death. In 1561 he moved to Seville to complete the altarpiece. He settled there, putting together an important studio with collaborators including his brother-in-law and carver Juan de Oviedo the Elder, Miguel de Adán, Gaspar del Águila, and Jerónimo Hernández.

This studio would play a major role in establishing and consolidating the Sevillian school of sculpture. They made major contributions to the second phase of the main altarpiece of the Cathedral of Seville, as well as the Church of Saint Mary in Carmona (1563), the decoration of the Real galley (1570), the Church of Saint Matthew in Lucena (1572), the Church of Saint Mary in Medina Sidonia (1575); he also sculpted the Virgin of the Fevers (Spanish: Virgen de las Fiebres) in Seville's Church of Saint Mary Magdalene.

He married three times: to Andrea Hernández, sister of Juan de Oviedo the Elder; to María de Bonilla, daughter of the Sevillian painter Juan de Zamora; and to Isabel de Valdés. He died in Llerena (province of Badajoz). His work was continued by his son Juan Bautista Vázquez the Younger.
