= Juan Bautista Vázquez the Younger =

Juan Bautista Vázquez the Younger (Spanish: Juan Bautista Vázquez el Mozo) was a Spanish sculptor, active in the late 16th century and early 17th century, son of Juan Bautista Vázquez the Elder, and a member of the Sevillian school of sculpture.

== Life and work ==
Vázquez the Younger followed in his father's profession, inheriting his style and clientele. Together with Isidro de Villoldo, his father initiated the style identified as the Sevillian school of sculpture. He learned his art in his father's studio and with such sculptors as Jerónimo Hernández, with whom it appears he worked as an oficial (a person who would be left in charge of operations in the master's absence), and with others who also followed his father's style.

He worked in Seville between 1578 and 1600, and had died by 1610. He married in 1579 to Lucía de Chaves, sister of his stepmother Isabel de Valdés (his father's third wide). It is quite unlikely that he would have been the same person as the Bautista Vázquez who was a notable sculptor before 1590 in the province of León. Artistically, he was not particularly known for individual personality nor originality. His work is overshadowed by his father's, and blends into the prevailing mannerism of his time. The documents from which we know of his artistic production always reflect partnerships or transfers of assignments to other artists, perhaps with greater artistic merits but with less reputation. If the critical attributions of his work are accurate, his style represented a transition into the Baroque, but lacking the aplomb and plasticity shown by his father, his work lacks the classical serenity that linked his father's work to the Renaissance in a manner directly opposed to the tempestuous style of Alonso Berruguete.

According to the known documents, in 1585 he contracted, together with Jerónimo Hernández, to produce an altarpiece for the parish church of Santa María in Arcos de la Frontera (province of Cádiz), taking charge of the side of the epistle. In 1588 he contracted the collaboration of Diego López Bueno in the carving and architectural adornment; in 1590 he passed the remaining work on to Miguel de Adán. Based on stylistic resemblance to the work of his father, all that is believed to be by his own hand are the reliefs of the evangelists Saint Luke and Mark, and the base of the altarpiece. It is unlikely that he executed the relief of the Visitation, which Adán claimed to have carved.

In 1585 he worked for the Jesuits in Seville, and while it is not clear exactly what he worked on, he is usually attributed the oldest part of the altarpiece of the Immaculate Conception in the Church of the Annunciation (which was a Jesuit church at the time), with a series of small figures of martyrs, a Saint Francis, a Saint Roch, and a Saint Sebastian, none of them with any particularly personal touches, although the Sebastian certainly reflects the style he would have learned in his father's studio. He is also attributed small figures of Saint Ann and the Virgin and Child, which resemble the style of Roque Balduque.

In 1589 he transferred to Juan de Oviedo the Younger the work on the main altarpiece of the parish church of Azuaga (province of Badajoz), which had been in his charge for a year. Those who knew this work, destroyed in 1936, attributed it to Juan de Oviedo. Of the Marian themes so often present in his father's work, the Virgin and Child in the parish church of Beas (province of Huelva) does appear to be his.

He is traditionally considered the author of the Saint John the Apostle, Saint John the Evangelist, Christ at the Column, and the reliefs of the Annunciation, the Epiphany and the Circumcision on the altarpiece of the Monastery of Saint Jerome in Granada. However, comparative study with his father's work in the Church of Santa María in Medina Sidonia and that of the Granadan Melchor de Turín has led critics to believe these are more likely to be the work of the latter (who also was strongly influenced by the elder Vázquez). If these are works of Vázquez the Younger, there is little in them that relates to the works of the University of Seville, nor others attributed to him; on the contrary, the reliefs and figures show interesting relationships of types, proportions and the manner of composition and execution to those of Medina Sidonia and of the Church of Santa María in Arcos de la Frontera. In short, the art of Vázquez the Younger is surrounded by numerous doubts and disputable attributions that could either make his work an important continuation of his father's serene and classic style or, on the contrary, an obscure artist with a mannered and unoriginal production, always with the collaboration of numerous helpers who took over the work, and on occasion even the contracts.
