= Dominic Lynch =

Irish Dominican friar and theologian

Dominic Lynch D.D. (died c. 1697) was an Irish Dominican friar. He made a career in Spain, and published a Latin treatise on Aristotelian and Thomist thought.

== Life ==
Born in County Galway, he was son of Peter Lynch of Shruell, by his wife, Mary Skerret. He joined the Order of St. Dominic, and made his profession in the Dominican convent of San Pablo, Seville, where he lived for many years.

Lynch became lecturer in arts and philosophy in the convent, and then master of the students. In 1674 he was appointed to the chair of theology in the Colegio de Santo Tomás, Seville in 1674; the post followed a report on Lynch's pedigree from Ireland (later printed with annotations by James Hardiman).

Lynch was elected by his brethren of the province of Andalucia to attend the congregation of the order held at Rome in 1686, over which he presided as moderator. He died in the Colegio de Santo Tomás at the end of 1697 or the beginning of the following year.

== Works ==
Lynch wrote: Summa Philosophiæ Speculativæ juxta Mentem et Doctrinam S. Thomæ et Aristotelis, in four volumes:

- Tom. 1. Complectens primam Partem Philosophiæ Rationis, quæ communiter nuncupantur Dialectica, Paris, 1666
- Tom. 2. Complectens duas Partes, quæ communiter nuncupantur Logica, Paris, 1667
- Tom. 3. Comprehendens tertiam Partem Philosophiæ rationalis, in quâ agitur de Prædicabilibus, Prædicamentis, et de Posterioribus, Paris, 1670
- Tom. 4. Complectens primam Partem Physicæ naturalis, Paris, 1686.

== Notes ==
Attribution

This article incorporates text from a publication now in the public domain: Lee, Sidney, ed. (1893). "Lynch, Dominic". Dictionary of National Biography. Vol. 34. London: Smith, Elder & Co.
