= Santa María Magdalena, Seville =

Church in Seville, Spain

Coordinates: 37°23′25″N 5°59′55″W

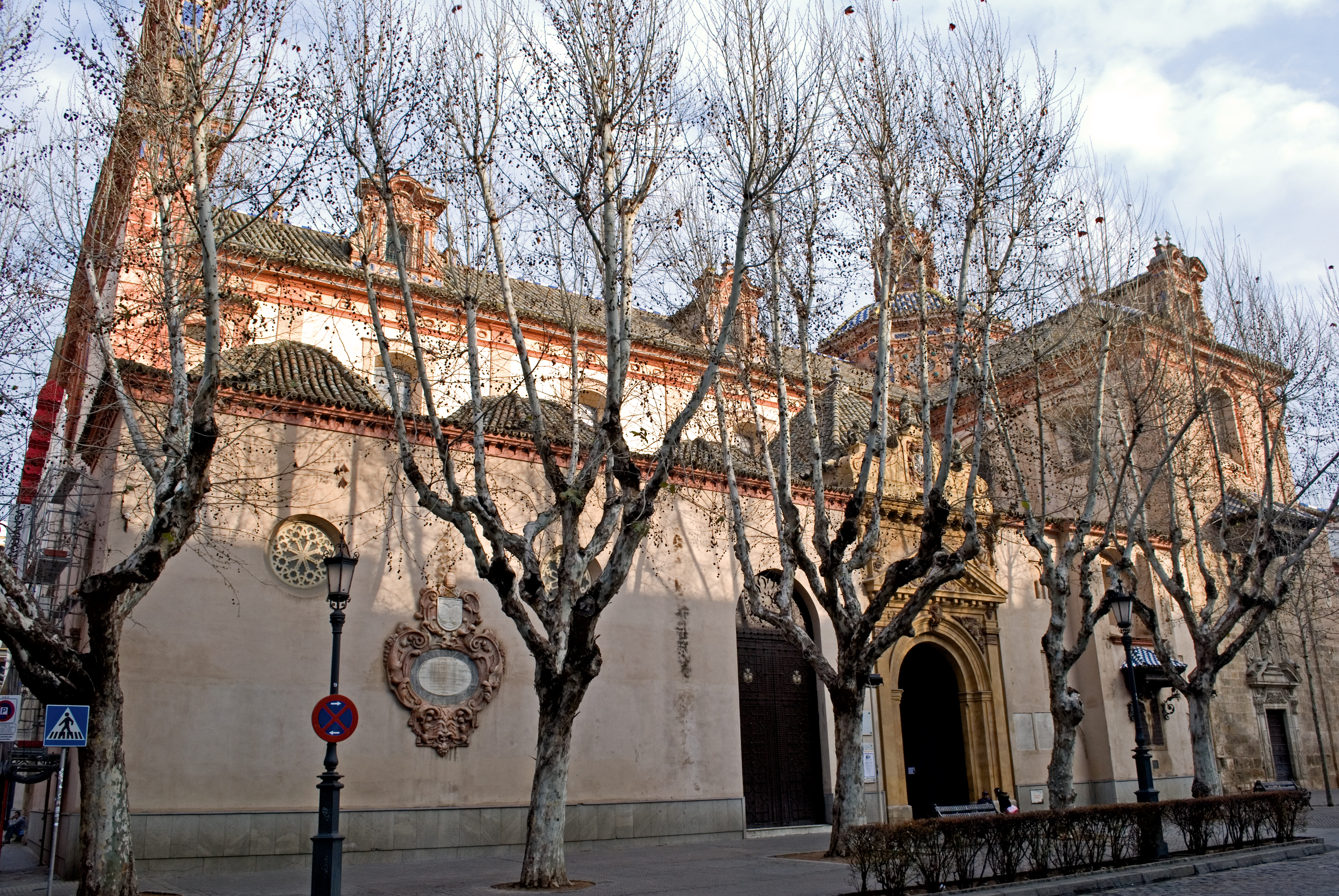
Church of Santa María Magdalena.

Santa María Magdalena is a Baroque church in Seville, southern Spain. It was built in 1691-1709 to a design of architect Leonardo de Figueroa.

It is the seat of various hermandades (confraternities which participate in the religious processions for which Seville is famous).

== History ==
The church was built to serve a Dominican monastery, and replaced a medieval building dating from after the Christian conquest of the city in 1248. The monastery was closed in the 19th century, and Santa María Magdalena became a parish church.

== Architecture ==
The façade has three portals, one featuring a sculpture of "St. Dominic" by Pedro Roldán. Above the portals are an oculus, sided by two blue spheres symbolizing the mystery of the rosary, and a bell-gable (1697). All the exterior of the church is characterized by a large use of blue and red decorative motifs.

The interior has a nave and two aisles, a transept and five chapels, including the only one remaining from the previous edifice, that of the Hermandad de la Quinta Angustia (Brotherhood of the Fifth Anguish) and a presbytery. The nave is surmounted by an octagonal dome, whose exterior is decorated with fugres resembling Inca Indians. The interior of the church has a rich Baroque decoration with stuccoes and gold patina.

The Chapel of the Dulce Nombre de Jesús has another work by Roldán and a Christ Reborn by Jerónimo Hernández. The high altar is in Baroque style (18th century), with sculptures by Pedro Duque y Cornejo and Francisco de Ocampo, while the retable of the Assumption was executed by Juan de Mesa. Other artworks include frescoes by Lucas Valdés and two canvasses by Francisco de Zurbarán

== See also ==
- 18th-century Western domes
