= Leonardo de Figueroa =

Spanish architect

- Born: c. 1650; Utiel, Kingdom of Valencia, Crown of Aragon
- Died: April 9, 1730 (aged 79–80); Seville, Kingdom of Seville, Crown of Castile
- Occupation: Architect
- Notable work: Church of San Salvador
- Children: Ambrosio de Figueroa; Matías de Figueroa

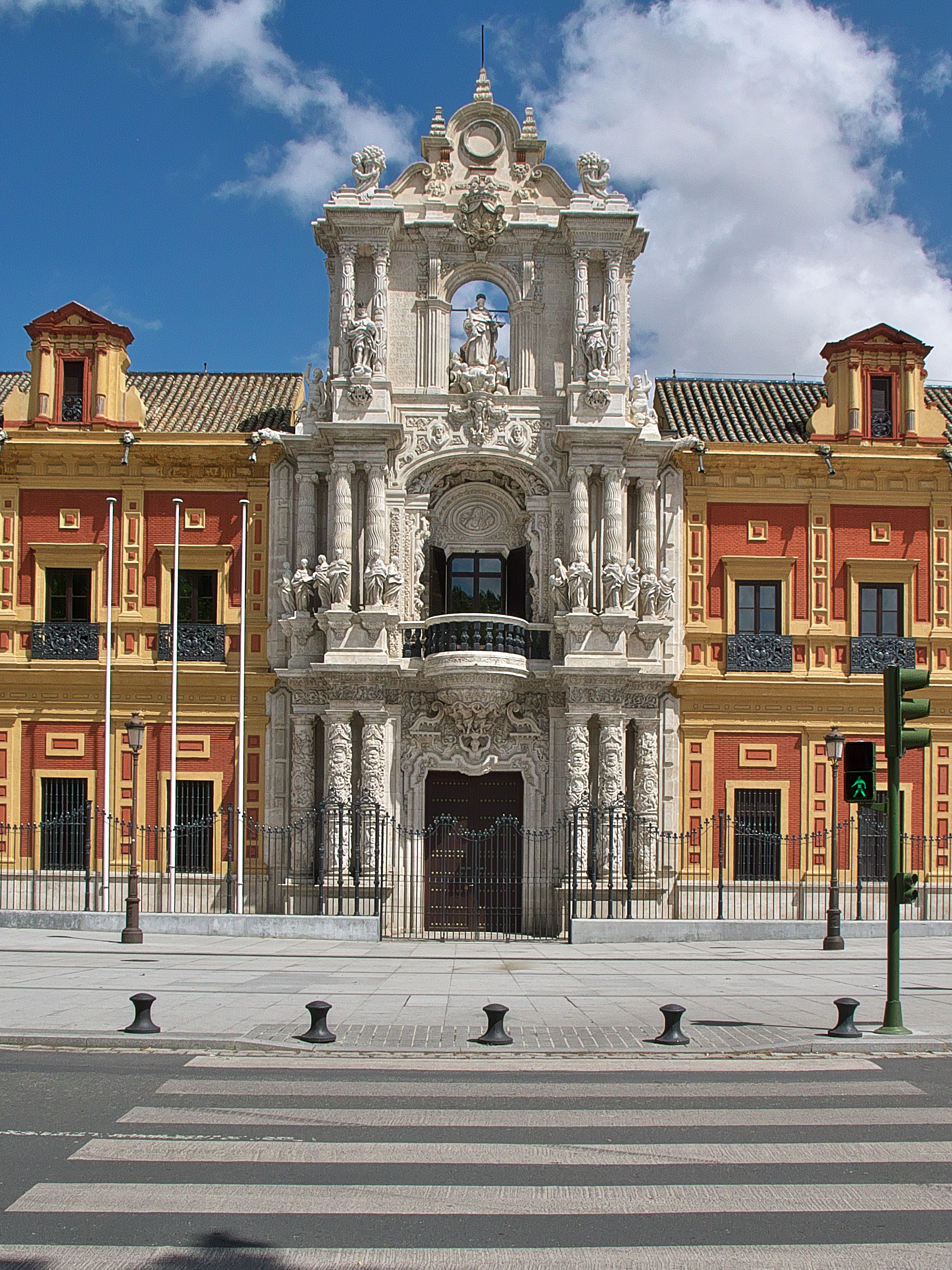
Palace of San Telmo Seville

Leonardo de Figueroa (c. 1650, Utiel – 1730, Seville) was a Spanish architect active in Seville.

== Works ==
In Seville.

- Designed the Santa María Magdalena church (1691-1706).
- Hospital de la Caridad ("Charity Hospital"). Façade.
- Hospital de los Venerables (1675-1697).
- Church of the Savior. Vaults and dome (From 1696 up to 1712).
- Palace of San Telmo, Seville. Principal façade and baroque chapel (from 1722).
- Church of St. Louis of the French (1699-1734).

== Sources ==
- Rolf Toman, Barbara Borngässer. The Baroque: Architecture, Sculpture, Painting. Cologne: Köneman, 1998 ISBN 978-3895089176
