= Mesa (surname) =

Mesa is a surname. Notable people with the surname include:

- Antonio Mesa (fl. 1902–1905), Cuban baseball player, member of the Cuban Baseball Hall of Fame
- Arnaldo Mesa (1967–2012), Cuban boxer
- Carlos Mesa (born 1953), Bolivian historian and former politician
- Cristóbal de Mesa (1559–1633), Spanish Mannerist poet and writer
- Eddie Mesa (born 1940), Filipino actor and singer
- José Mesa (born 1966), American baseball pitcher
- Juan de Mesa (1583–1627), Spanish Baroque sculptor
- Juan Carlos Mesa (1930–2016), Argentine humorist, screenwriter and director
- Liana Mesa (born 1977), Cuban volleyball player
- Maikel Mesa (born 1991), Spanish footballer
- Manuel Mesa (born 1952), Spanish retired footballer
- Melky Mesa (born 1987), Dominican professional baseball outfielder
- Milena Mesa (born 1993), Cuban team handball player
- Raúl Mesa (born 1982), Spanish beach volleyball player
- Roque Mesa (born 1989), Spanish footballer
- Ubaldo Mesa (1973–2005), Colombian cyclist
- Uberlino Mesa (born 1971), Colombian cyclist
- Víctor Mesa (born 1960), Cuban baseball player
- Vilma Mesa (born 1963), Colombian-American mathematics educator
- Yosniel Mesa (born 1980), Cuban football forward
- Nano Mesa (born 1995), Spanish footballer
