= Francisco Ruiz Gijón =

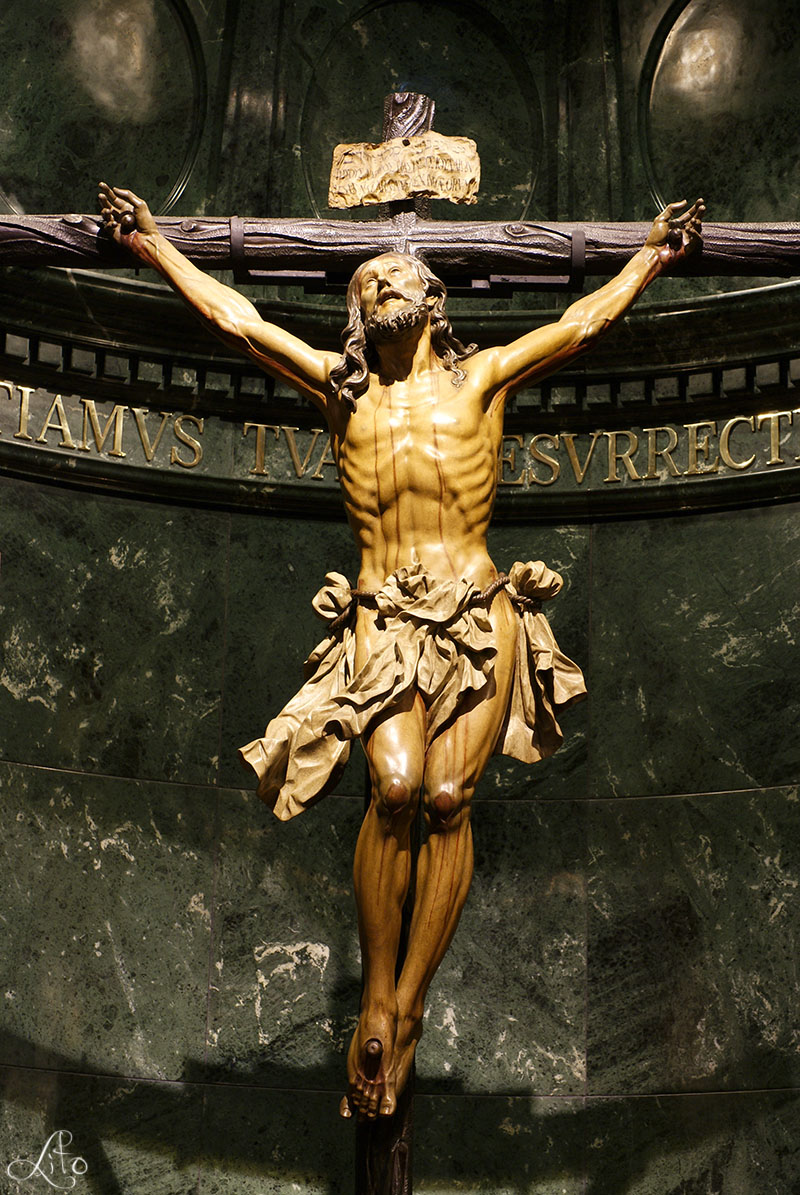
- Expiring Christ known as El Cachorro; Chapel of el Cachorro, Seville
- Born: 1653; Utrera, Spain
- Died: 1720 (aged 66–67); Seville, Spain
- Known for: Sculpture
- Movement: Baroque

Francisco Ruiz Gijón (Utrera, 1653 - Seville, 1720) was a Spanish sculptor of the Baroque period. He belongs to the Andalusian school, following the style of Pedro Roldán. He studied with sculptor Andrés Cansino and developed his artistic career in Seville.

== Works ==
His works are exclusively religious. He worked for several Catholic churches and brotherhoods. His most important creations are related to the Holy Week processions in Seville.

=== Imagery ===
- Expiring Christ, known as El Cachorro. The face of this image is a realistic portrait of a famous gypsy of Triana, called El Cachorro, literally meaning Little Puppy. 1682.
- Sainte Anne, Church of Santa María Magdalena
- Simon of Cyrene, Church of San Isidoro. 1687.
- Jesus carrying the cross. Brotherhood of San Isidoro. 1688 (partially lost)
- Four Evangelist. Brotherhood of El Museo. 1700. (Atrib.)

=== Processional Floats ===
- The paso for Jesús del Gran Poder. 1692.
- The paso for Cristo del Amor. Church of The Saviour. 1694.

== Bibliography ==
- Roda Peña, José: Francisco Antonio Ruiz Gijón escultor utrerano. Siarum Editores S.C. ISBN 84-932925-2-4
