= ION Geophysical =

American petroleum company

ION Geophysical Corporation
- Type: Public
- Traded as: NYSE: IO; Russell 2000 Component
- Industry: Petroleum
- Founded: 1968
- Headquarters: Houston, Texas, United States
- Area served: Global
- Key people: Chris Usher (CEO)
- Products: Geophysical Services
- Number of employees: 500

ION Geophysical was a technology-focused company that provided advanced acquisition equipment, software, planning, and seismic processing services, as well as seismic data libraries to the global oil and gas industry.

== History ==
Founded in 1968, as Input/Output (I/O), ION began as a provider of highly specialized, seismic source synchronization equipment. ION was publicly traded on NASDAQ in 1991, and was listed on the New York Stock Exchange in November 1994 using the trading symbol "IO". Throughout the 1990s and 2000s ION experienced growth through a number of key acquisitions. In September 2007 Input / Output (I/O) officially changed its name to "ION" as part of a re-branding. The company filed for bankruptcy in the spring of 2022. In July 2022, the company announced that it would sell of parts of its assets and ceased operations during the bankruptcy procedure. The company completed its bankruptcy reorganization and exited Chapter 11 bankruptcy by September 2022.

== Key Acquisitions ==
- 1994 – Cable and connector groups of Tescorp, Inc., provided cables to operate I/O systems.
- 1995 – Western Geophysical's Exploration Products Group, marine seismic recording systems, vibrator source products, and geophone products.
- 1997 – Green Mountain Geophysics, Inc. (GMG), developer of MESA software for seismic survey design and planning.
- 1998 – DigiCOURSE, Inc., manufacturer of marine positioning products, from Laitram, LLC
- 2001 – Pelton Company, Inc. Pelton makes seismic vibrator control systems, vibrator positioning systems using GPS (global positioning systems), and explosive energy control systems.
- 2002 – AXIS Geophysics, seismic data processing company specializing in anisotropic processing (AZIM), AVO (amplitude variation with offset) analysis, and azimuthal velocity modeling.
- 2004 – Concept Systems, Ltd., command & control systems and data integration software for land and marine seismic surveys.
- 2004 – GX Technology Corporation, seismic imaging processing and multi-client seismic data libraries, including a portfolio of BasinSPAN data libraries.
- 2008 – ARAM Systems Ltd., a Canadian-based provider of cable-based land seismic recording systems, based in Calgary, AB.
- 2010 – INOVA Geophysical Equipment Limited, ION launched a joint venture with BGP.

== Activities ==
Since 1967, ION's Sensor group has been providing geophones for hydrocarbon exploration.

ION's Marine Imaging Systems. The offerings include both the towed streamer and ocean-bottom seismic markets. The products include positioning and streamer control systems, source and source control systems, and both streamer and seabed acquisition systems.

ION's GX Technology (GXT), provides seismic data processing services, such as depth migration, reverse time migration, and full-wave imaging; multi-client seismic data libraries, including basin-scale SPAN seismic programs; software and services for seismic survey design, geophysical analysis, and reservoir modeling; and start-to-finish seismic imaging programs that encompass survey planning, field acquisition, and final image rendering.

Through its GeoVentures business unit, ION owns one of the largest seismic data libraries in the industry. Known as BasinSPANS, these basin-wide, ultra-deep data libraries are custom designed to provide a holistic understanding of petroleum systems including source rock deposition, hydrocarbon migration paths, sediment fairways, and reservoir trapping mechanisms. ION BasinSPAN programs exist for the Gulf of Mexico, the margins of West and East Africa and for offshore basins in Colombia and the eastern Caribbean, India, Eastern and Northern Canada, and Alaska.

ION's Concept Systems offerings include command & control systems that integrate and quality control data acquisition in towed streamer, OBC, electromagnetic (EM), and land surveys and services for designing and planning complex surveys, including wide-azimuth and 4d acquisition programs.

In March 2010, ION launched a joint venture agreement with BGP (which is a wholly owned subsidiary of China National Petroleum Corporation – CNPC) and launched INOVA Geophysical Equipment Limited, an independent company owned 51% by BGP and 49% by ION Geophysical. INOVA specializes in designing, engineering, and delivering energy source and source control systems, land seismic recording systems, and digital full-wave sensors. Since the joint venture, most of ION's land equipment and technology is applied through INOVA.

== Restatements ==
On April 1, 2002, ION announced to restate its noncash balance sheet transaction for the sale/leaseback of its Stafford plants completed in August. The restatement had no impact on earnings.

On August 3, 2005, ION announced to restate its financial statements for the first quarter of 2005, as a result of the company's determination that approximately $795,000 of royalty expenses incurred by its subsidiary had been miscalculated and should have been recorded in the first quarter of 2005.

On March 16, 2006, ION announced revenue recognition restatement of 2004 and quarterly 2005 results.

== See also ==
- List of oilfield service companies
