= La Mesa =

La Mesa may refer to:

== Mexico ==
- La Mesa (Tijuana)
  - La Mesa Prison, a prison in the borough of La Mesa
- La Mesa (Mexicable), an aerial lift station in Ecatepec, Mexico

== Philippines ==
- La Mesa Dam and Reservoir, Quezon City
  - La Mesa Watershed Reservation, an area surrounding the dam and reservoir

== Panama ==
- La Mesa, Los Santos
- La Mesa District, Veraguas Province
  - La Mesa, Veraguas, a corregimiento in the district

== United States ==
- La Mesa, California
- La Mesa Reservoir (California), now Lake Murray, in San Diego
- La Mesa, New Mexico
- La Mesa Motel, a demolished historic motel in Albuquerque, New Mexico
- La Mesa Park, a defunct horse racing track in Raton, New Mexico

== Other countries ==
- La Mesa (mountain), Argentina
- La Mesa, Cundinamarca, Colombia

== See also ==
- La Mesada (disambiguation)
- Lamesa, Texas, US
- Las Mesas, a municipality in Cuenca, Castile-La Mancha, Spain
