= La Mesada =

La Mesada may refer to:

- La Mesada, Catamarca, Argentina
- La Mesada, Salta, Argentina
