= Pedro Duque y Cornejo =

Spanish Baroque painter and sculptor (1677–1757)

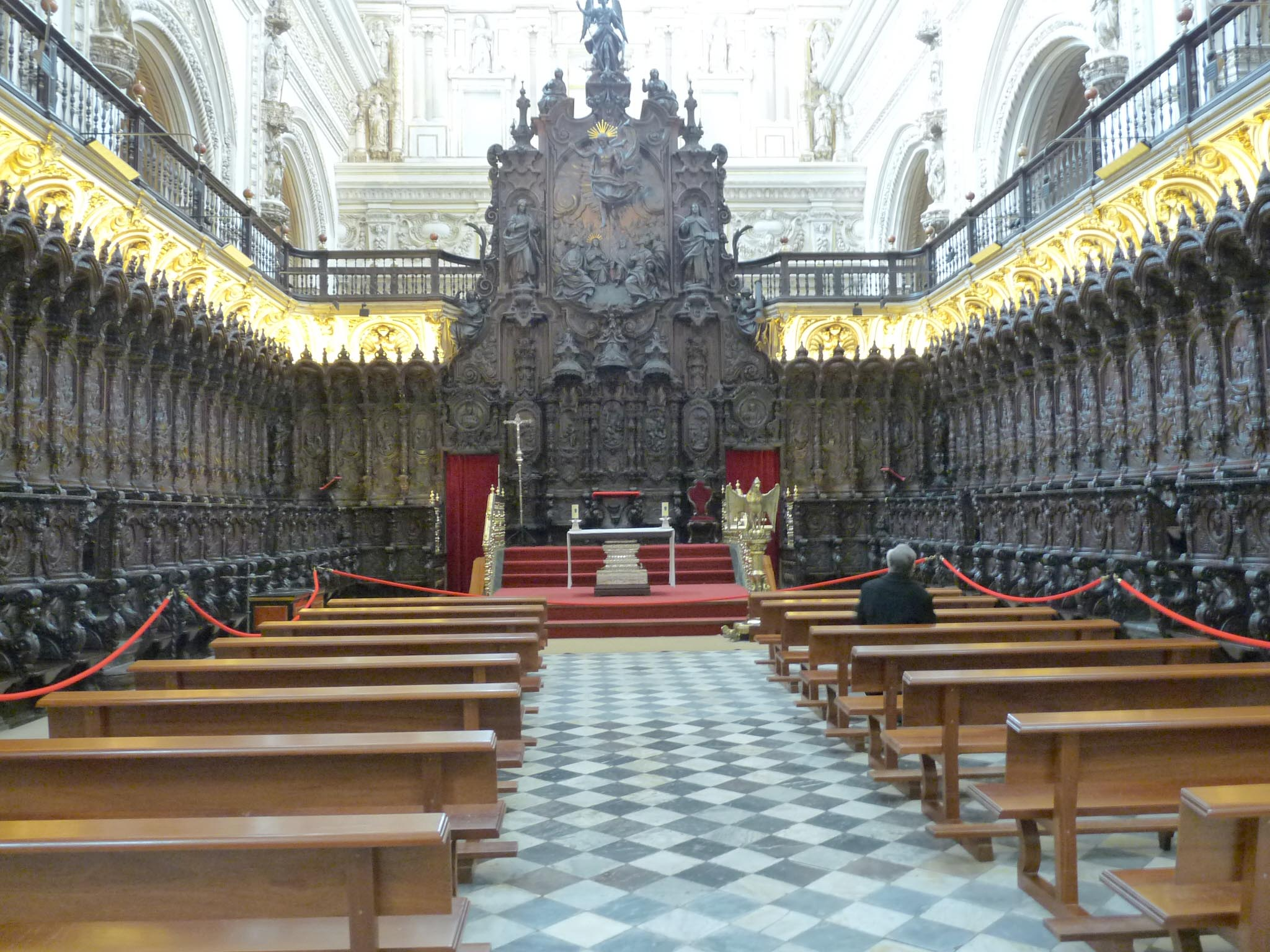
Choir at the Cathedral of Córdoba (Catédral de Córdoba)

Pedro Duque y Cornejo (1677–1757) was a Spanish Baroque painter and sculptor of the Sevillian school of sculpture, a disciple of his grandfather Pedro Roldán.

He was born in Seville and worked mostly in his home city (church of the Sagrario, Palace of San Telmo and the local Cathedral), Granada and Madrid (statues in Santa Maria de El Paular, after 1725). In Córdoba he executed the choir at the Mosque-cathedral. He died in Córdoba.

== Sources ==
- Gómez-Moreno, M. E. (1951). Breve historia de la escultura española. Madrid.
- Quintero, P. (1908). Sillas de coro españolas. Madrid.
- Aguilar Prieto, R. Bosquejo histórico de la ejecución de la sillería del coro de la catedral de Córdoba. «Bol. de la R. A. de Bellas Artes de Córdoba», n° 56.
