= Monasterio de San Jerónimo, Granada =

Catholic monastery in Granada, Spain

Coordinates: 37°10′45″N 3°36′14″W

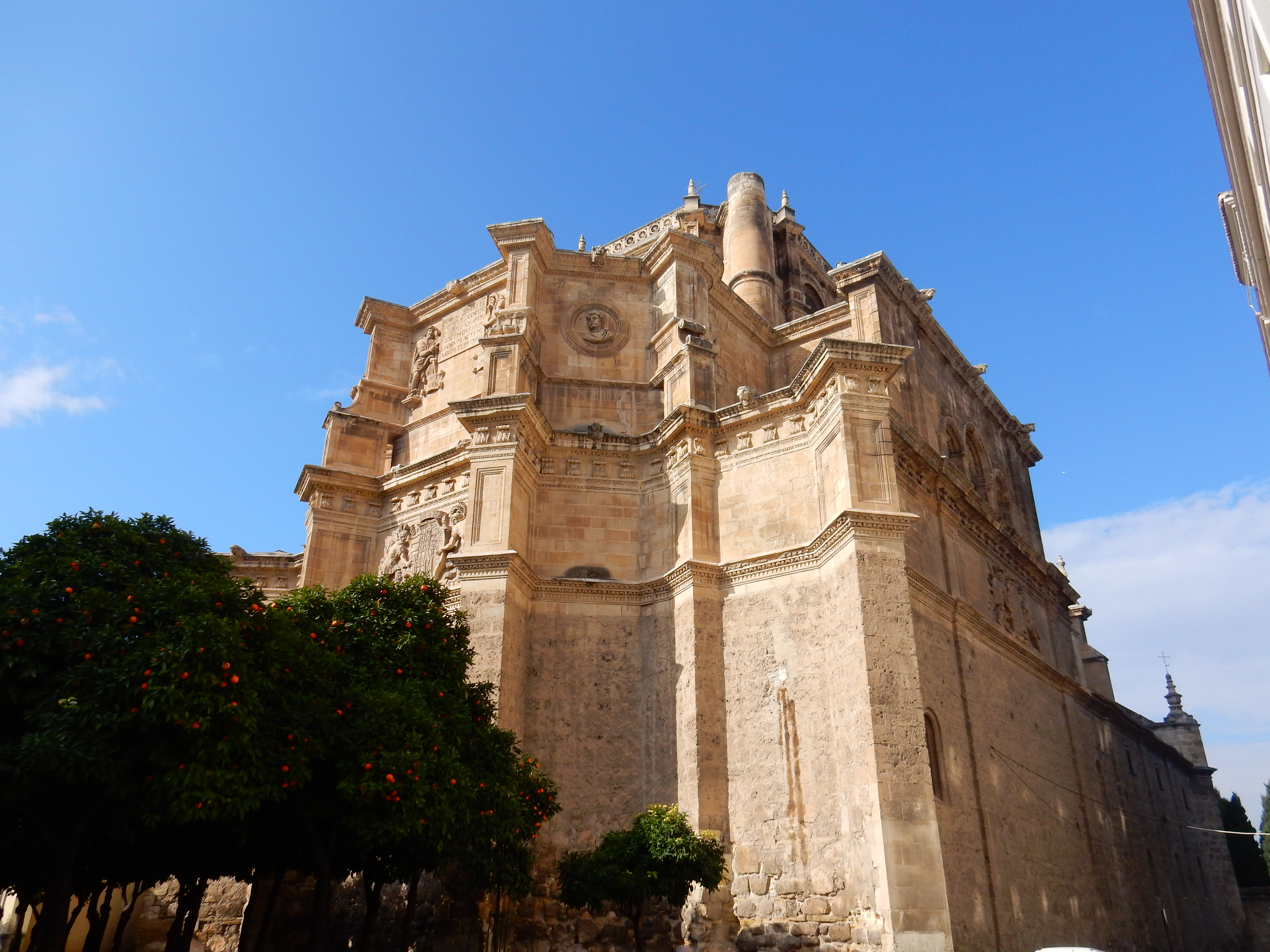
View of the monastery

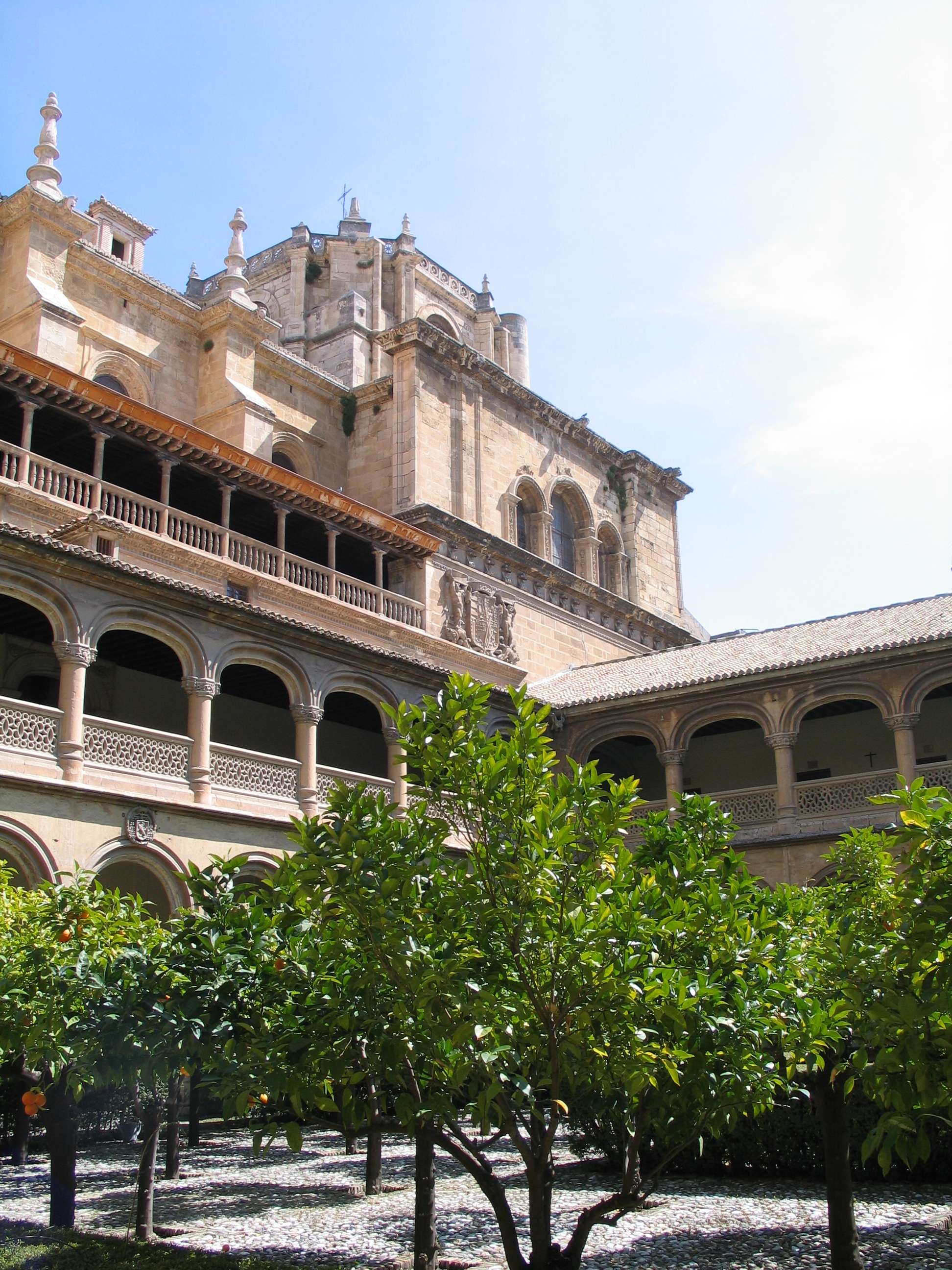
View of one of the cloisters of the monastery.

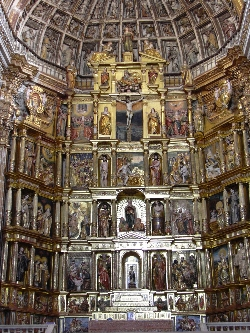
Altarpiece of the Church of St. Jerome.

The Royal Monastery of St. Jerome (Spanish: Real Monasterio de San Jerónimo de Granada) is a Roman Catholic Hieronymite monastery in Granada, Spain. Architecturally, it is in the Renaissance style. The church, famous for its architecture, was the first in the world consecrated to the Immaculate Conception of Mary.

== History ==
The monastery was founded by the Catholic Monarchs Isabella I of Castile and Ferdinand II of Aragon in Santa Fe outside the city of Granada, during the siege of the latter city, the last stage of the Reconquista. The construction of the current buildings in Granada properly began in 1504, and the monastery relocated at that time. The principal architect and sculptor was Diego de Siloé; others involved as architects or sculptors included Jacopo Torni (from Florence), Juan de Aragón, Juan Bautista Vázquez the Younger (Vázquez el Mozo), Pedro de Orea, and Pablo de Rojas, the last three associated with the Granadan school of sculpture.

The Hieronymites are an Augustinian order. The monastery church follows the usual plan for churches of this order, a Latin Cross with an elevated choir at the foot and the altar behind a wide staircase. The mannerist altarpiece of the main chapel is considered the point of departure of Andalusian sculpture as such; it is mainly the work of Pablo de Rojas. The richly decorated Renaissance interior features coffering, scalloping and sculptures, and is a late work of Renaissance humanism. The iconographic program highlights the military and the heroic grandeur of the Gonzalo Fernández de Córdoba, known as the Gran Capitán ("Great Captain"), who is buried in the crossing with his wife, Doña Maria de Manrique.

As of 1513, the church was under construction under the leadership of Jacopo Torni 1513. Upon his death in 1526, the task devolved to Diego de Siloé. The main chapel was completed in 1522 and the bodies of the Great Captain and his wife were moved from the Casa Grande of the Convent of Saint Francis.

Although occupied again today by the same order of monks as at the time of its founding, the monastery has undergone many vicissitudes, including invasion by the French in the Napoleonic era during the Peninsular War. The Hieronymites were expelled and the monastery eventually became a near-ruin. The State undertook a restoration of the building in 1916–1920, hiring the architect Fernando Wihelmi for the job. The slender tower of the church had been demolished by the French, who used its stones to build the bridge known as the Puente Verde, which crosses the River Genil, linking the Paseo de la Bomba to the Avenida de Cervantes. Only in the 1980s was the tower re-erected; the project was completed in 1989.

On 1 November 2022, their venerated image of "Our Lady of Solitude" was canonically crowned by Pope Francis through a decree dated 18 October 2022.

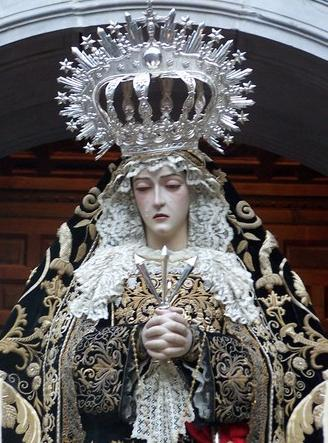
Venerated image of Our Lady of Solitude

== Architecture ==
The monastery has two cloisters, each built around a garden. The older of the two has more genuinely Renaissance decoration: seven arcosolia in the style of chapels, richly adorned in classical style, configure a funerary space that was originally intended to receive the Great Captain's remains into the monastery. The second cloister, now the enclosure of the monastery's community of monks, was the residence of the Empress Isabella of Portugal on her wedding voyage after her marriage to Charles I of Spain (Holy Roman Emperor Charles V).

The gateway that separates the grounds of the monastery from the Calle Rector López Argueta is, indeed, original to the monastery, but had disappeared in the 19th century and was only returned to its position in the 1960s after being found abandoned in a courtyard of in the Vega de Granada. The sculpture of the Virgin of Sorrows on the gate is not original.

From the beginning of 2004 until March 2005, the main altarpiece underwent restoration work under the aegis of the Ministry of Culture; during this time, the altarpiece was covered by a giant blow-up photo of itself.

== See also ==
- San Juan de Dios Hospital (Granada)
- 16th-century Western domes
