= Luisa Roldán =

Spanish sculptor (1652–1706)

- Born: 8 September 1652; Seville
- Died: 10 January 1706 (aged 53); Madrid
- Resting place: Parish Church of San Andrés, Madrid
- Education: Her father, Pedro Roldán
- Known for: Sculpture

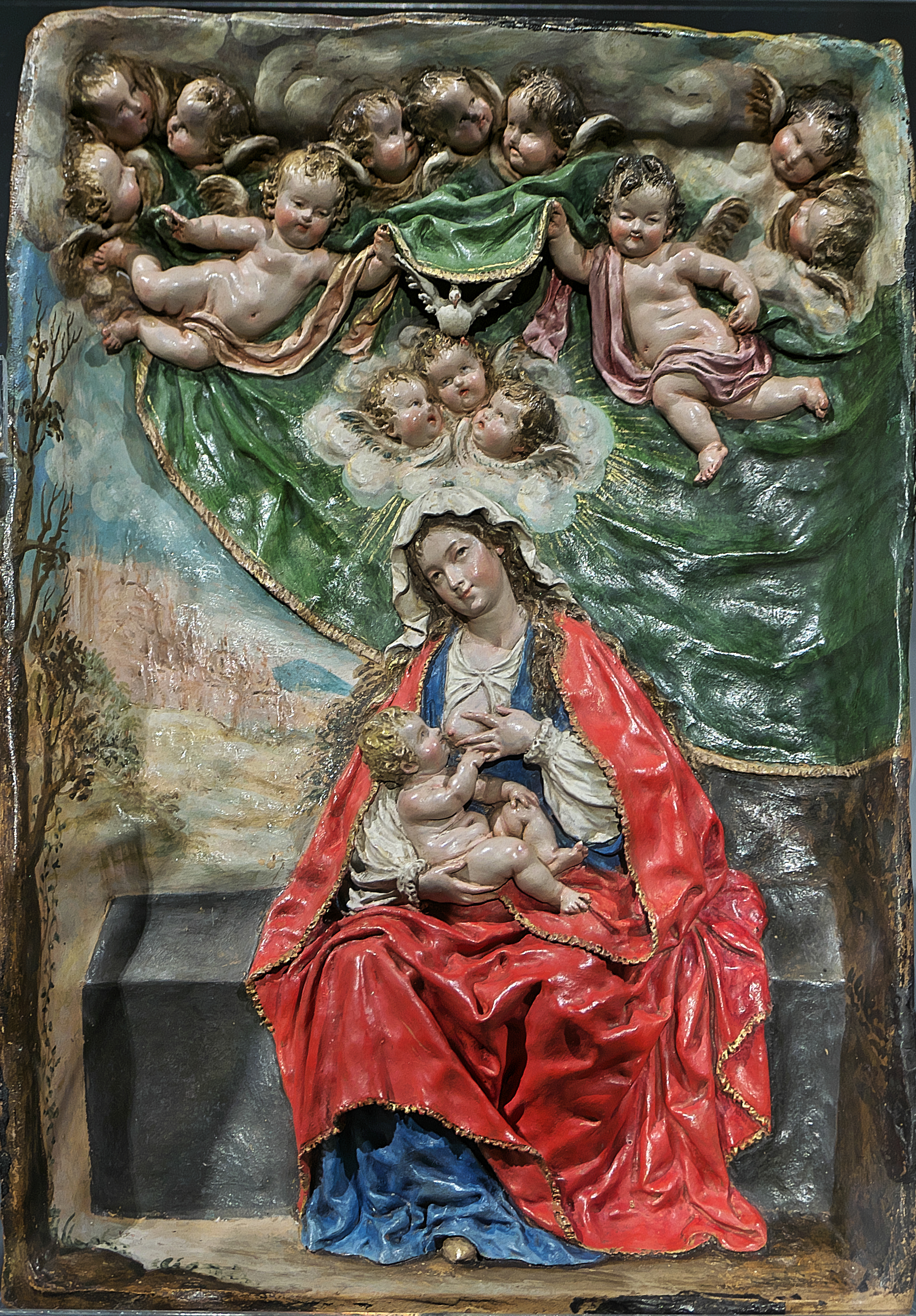
Virgo lactans, c. 1689-1706, Museum of Fine Arts, Seville

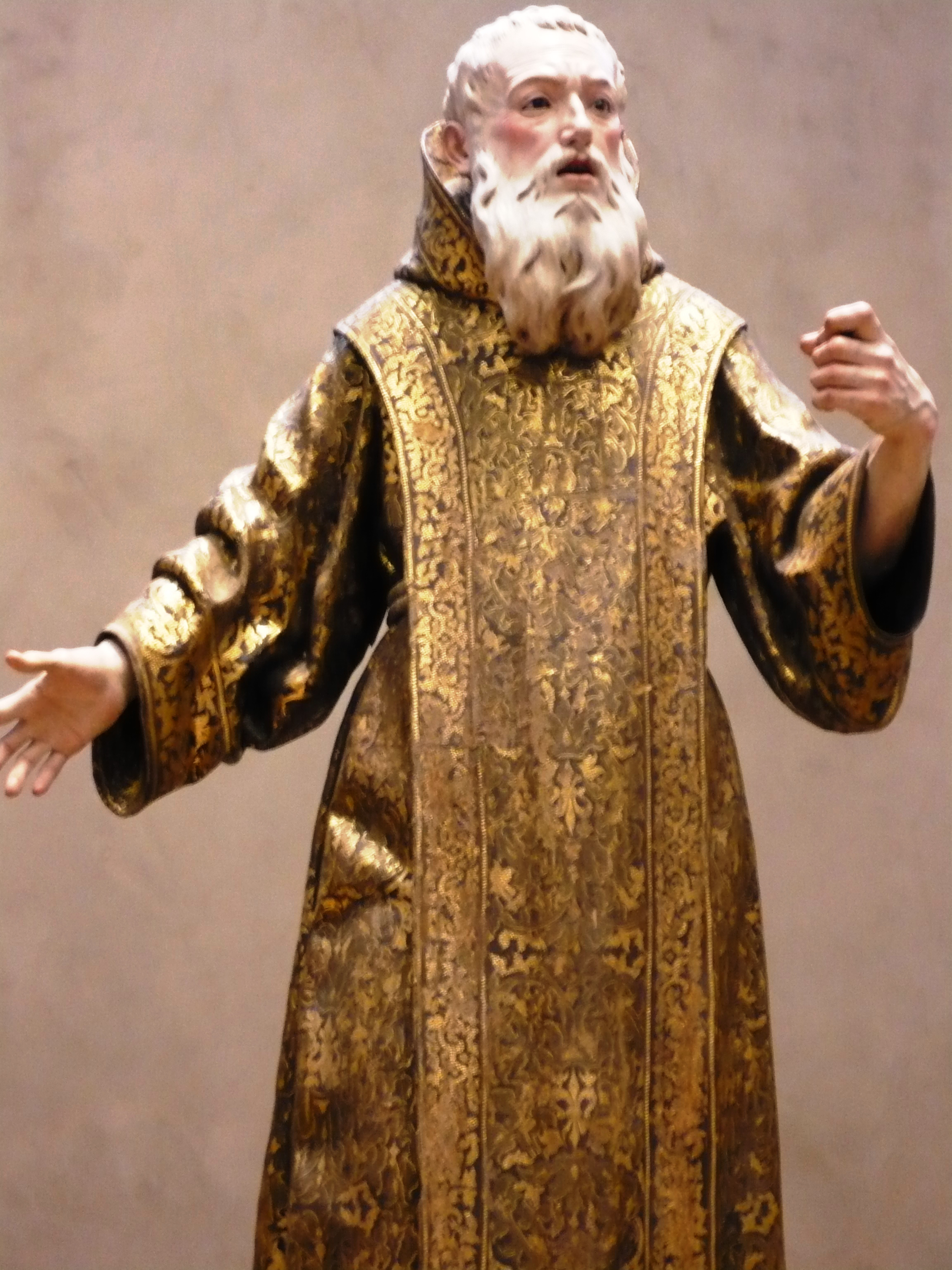
Saint Ginés de la Jara, 1692, J. Paul Getty Museum, Los Angeles

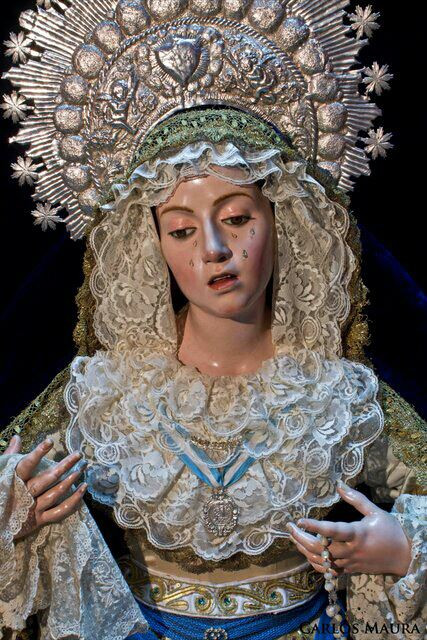
Virgin of Solitude, 1688, Iglesia de la Victoria, Puerto Real

Luisa Ignacia Roldán (8 September 1652 – 10 January 1706), known also as La Roldana, was a Spanish sculptor of the Baroque Era. She is the earliest woman sculptor documented in Spain. Roldán is recognized by the Hispanic Society of America for being "one of the few women artists to have maintained a studio outside the convents in Golden Age Spain".

Because of the quality of her work, Antonio Palomino considered her as important a sculptor as her father, Pedro Roldán.

Although Roldán became the Escultor de Cámara, or Court Sculptor, to the Habsburg King Charles II, she struggled financially. Like many artists of her time she died poor, signing a declaration of poverty shortly before her death. On the day of her death, Roldan was given the title of "Academician of Merit" from the Accademia di San Luca in Rome.

== Early life ==
Roldán was born in Seville, Spain, the daughter of sculptor Pedro Roldán and his wife Teresa de Ortega. She was taught by her father, alongside her siblings, how to draw, utilize clay to shape figures and finally sculpt or carve in wood. She became an apprentice in her father's workshop.

Also working within the workshop was Luis Antonio de los Arcos, who Roldán married when she was 19. The marriage was against her father's wishes. Santiago Montoto, writing in 1920, went so far as to characterize it as an "abduction" ("rapto"), perhaps reflecting his lack of understanding of marriage customs of the period. The chosen partnerships of two of her sisters and one brother also met with parental disapproval.

Afterwards, Roldán worked in Cádiz from 1686 to 1688. She established her own workshop, together with her husband and her brother-in-law, Tomás de los Arcos, to create religious polychromed wooden sculptures. Roldán was the principal sculptor, while Tomás helped with his expertise in flesh painting and gilding. He was a specialist in painting flesh tones.

She created wooden sculptures as well as statues for the Cádiz Cathedral and the town council. In 1688 she moved to Madrid, and in 1692 was later awarded the position of "escultora de camara" or "Sculptor to the Chamber", serving Charles II and later Philip V as "Sculptor to the King". Roldán created a terracotta piece called the Virgen con el Nino, and donated it to the Accademia di San Luca, to which she was admitted at the end of her life.

Roldán had seven children, two of whom survived to adulthood. During her time working for Charles II, Roldán, her husband, and their children all suffered during the country's economic crisis.

She tried to improve her financial situation by appealing to Charles II's second wife, Queen Maria Anna for help. The queen responded by granting money, but it proved insufficient. Luisa's husband, Luis Antonio de los Arcos hoped to improve matters by applying for a position at court, but was unsuccessful.

Roldán's husband did play a part in marketing her work and extending her reputation. Charles II commissioned a sculpture titled of Nazareno ("Penitent"), but, following Charles's death, this remained in the artist's workshop. Her husband tried to have the sculpture sent to Rome through the recommendation of influential contacts, but instead it was purchased by a convent in Sisante, Cuenca.

Roldán died in poverty in Madrid in 1706.

== Major works ==
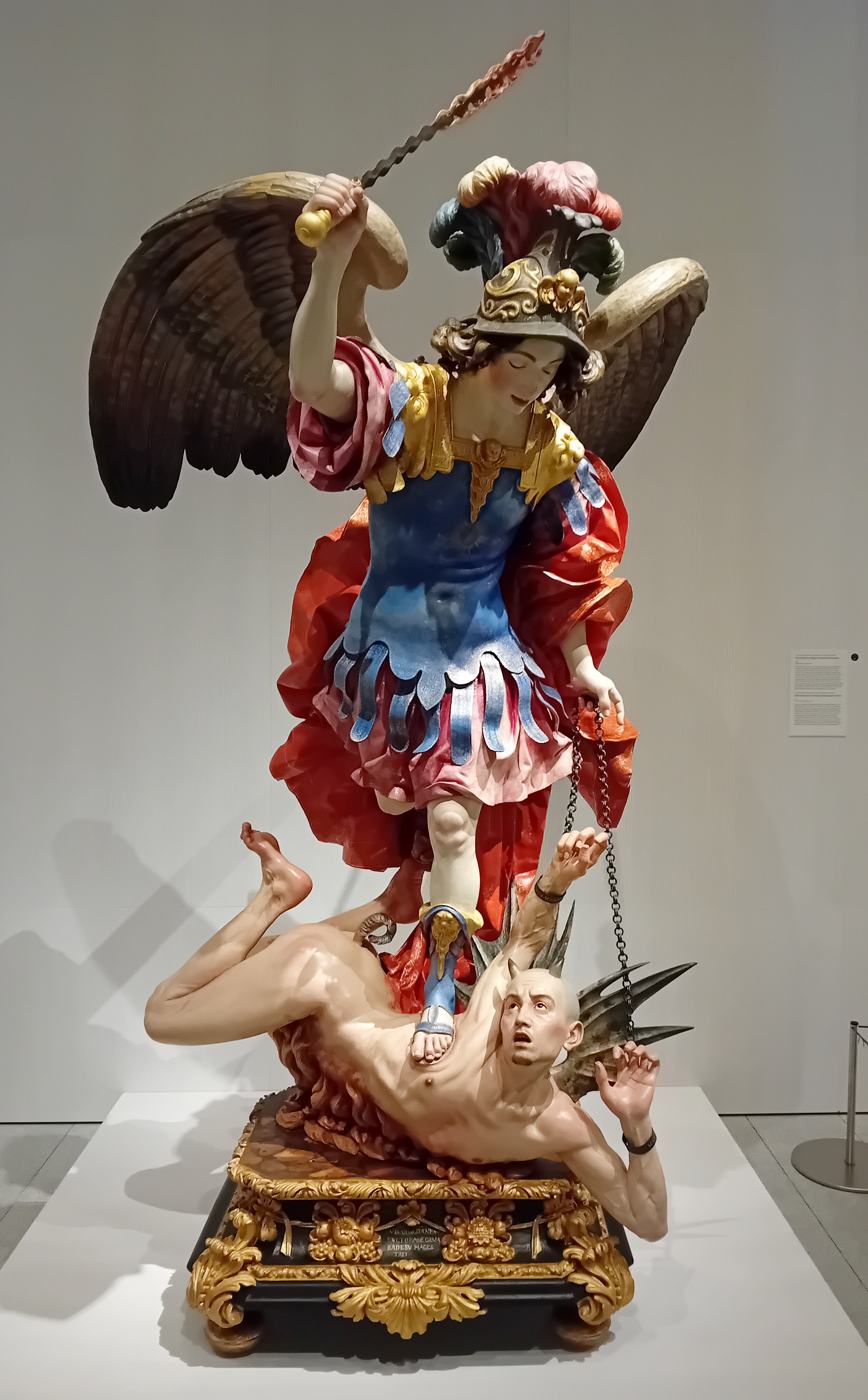
St. Michael Overwhelming the Demon, 1692, Royal Collections Gallery, Madrid

Roldán's works are strongly characterized as possessing "clearly delineated profiles, thick locks of hair, billowing draperies, and mystical faces with delicate eyes, knitting brows, rosy cheeks, and slightly parted lips." The "knitted brows" that are sometimes noted in her terracotta angels are not usually seen in her works in wood, which are characterized by open, evenly arched brows. Her St. Ginés de la Jara, made around 1692, is now at the Getty Center. Unlike the billowing cape of her St Michael in El Escorial, the robe worn by the Getty's San Gines is very still. Processional statues whose creation can be safely attributed to her include statues of the Virgen de la Soledad, Mary Magdalen, and Jesus. Her sculpture of the Virgen de la Soledad appeared in several Catholic Churches and appealed to many people from different social classes. In Cádiz, works by her include statues of Anthony of Padua, Ecce Homo, and Saints Servandus and Cermanus.

She was a prolific sculptor. Much of her work comprised religious sculptures for churches. For example, the sculptures of the holy saints, Archangel Saint Michael and Mary Magdalene. While living in Madrid she also made small terracotta works popular with the petty bourgeoisie. The smaller works could be used for personal devotion and took the forms of religious scenes, human forms and animals. Her pieces were widely distributed in Andalusia, as well as in Madrid, Móstoles and Sisante (Province of Cuenca), New York, London, Ontario, Los Angeles and Chicago.

The following sculptures in Spanish churches are attributed to her:

- Most Holy Mary of Silence (María Santísima del Silencio), Jaén
- Carved wooden figures of San Servando and San Germán, patrons of Cádiz, in the Cádiz Cathedral
- Saint Joseph, Iglesia de San Antonio, Cádiz
- Saint Anthony of Padua, Iglesia de Santa Cruz, Cádiz
- Saint John the Baptist, Iglesia de San Antonio de Padua, Cádiz
- Our Lady of Sorrows of the Remedies (Dolorosa de los Remedios), Jerez de la Frontera
- Virgin of Solitude (Virgen de la Soledad), Iglesia de la Victoria, Puerto Real
- Ecce Homo, Cádiz Cathedral. 1684. Carved polychromed wood, 165 cm. The date was confirmed by a document found in its interior during a restoration by J.M. Sánchez Peña in 1984. The head, arms, hands and torso to hip height were made in cedar, and the rest including the chlamys was made in pine.
- Ecce Homo, Córdoba
- Christ of the Pardon, (Cristo del Perdón), Fregenal de la Sierra
- Saint Ferdinand, Las Palmas Cathedral, Gran Canaria
- Penitent (Nazareno), Iglesia de las Hermanas Nazarenas, Sisante

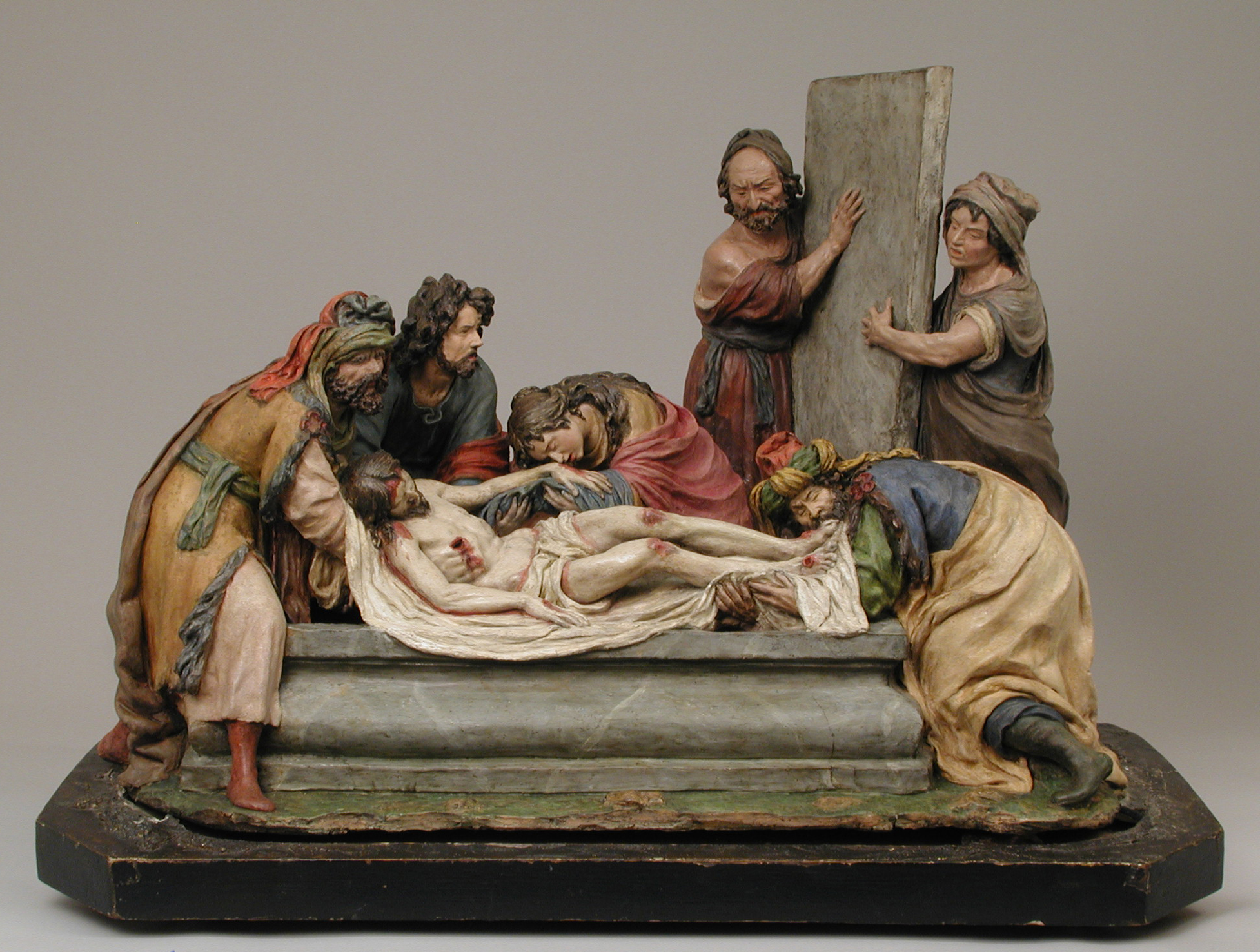
The Entombment of Christ (1701), Metropolitan Museum of Art

A figure of Mary Magdalene in Cádiz was destroyed by fire at the outbreak of the Spanish Civil War in 1936.

Other notable works are in collections and museums:

- St. Michael Overwhelming the Demon, Royal Collections Gallery, Madrid
- Virgo lactans, Museum of Fine Arts of Seville
- Death or Ecstasy of Mary Magdalene, Marriage of Saint Catherine, Hispanic Society of America, New York City
- Saint Joachim, Saint Ann and the Virgin as a Child (La Virgen niña con San Joaquín y Santa Ana) and Jesus' First Steps (Los primeros pasos de Jesús), Museum of Fine Arts, Guadalajara, Spain
- Saint Michael, Royal Ontario Museum, Toronto, Canada.
- The Virgin Appears to Saint James Victoria and Albert Museum, London, England.
- The Entombment of Christ, Metropolitan Museum of Art, New York.
- The Education of the Virgin, LACMA, Los Angeles.
- Education of the Virgin, Blanton Museum of Art, Austin.

== Style and method ==
Roldán's style of art was created through her point of view of the world, her access to resources and the materials she used to cultivate her detailed sculptures. She used three different types of wood to create certain sculptures, like the St. Ginés de la Jara. There were two types she preferred that were soft and fine grained.

Roldán and her father, Pedro made their sculptures, the Gines and Saint Joseph with the Child stable, yet light in weight by utilizing materials from different places in the world. They had to carefully choose materials that would help the stability of the statue. For example: they used the Mediterranean cypress which is a wood that came from through the Mediterranean. Spanish cedar was used for the hands, the most difficult part of the sculptures. After obtaining the materials Pedro used a technique that is known throughout the artistic world which is hollowing the section of wood. Roldan with smaller pieces of the wood would work on the feet. When she was done carving the feet she worked on the face. Luisa Roldán created the face and beard in a unique way by carving from a block of wood a mask that will eventually be joined with the back of the head. Finally, she added details, such as leaves and other patterns, to the base of the sculpture. The sculpture was then given to the painter, Tomás de los Arcos.

== Legacy ==
Luisa Roldán influenced several women artists in Seville, Cádiz and Madrid through her sculptures and artistic innovation. Women artists were seen as belonging to a "private" sphere and men to a "public" sphere. When Roldan created her sculptures she made her work public and changed the way art was perceived in the 1600s. She is a female artist that is known as the Spanish sculptor that created her own name. Through her artwork, she was able to earn a royal title as "escultora de camara". Roldán was able to illustrate her own entray called Lives of the Eminent Spanish Painters and Sculptors. However, in the eighteenth century it was discovered that more than ninety women were active artists in Spain and Portugal. Many other women artists were being discovered at the time Roldán published her artwork. She paved the way for innovational art that focused on terracotta imagery and sculptures.
