= Pelayos =

- Municipality
- Location in Salamanca
- Coordinates: 40°38′57″N 5°34′29″W
- Country: Spain
- Autonomous community: Castile and León
- Province: Salamanca
- Comarca: Tierra de Alba

Government
  - Mayor: Benigno López Suarez (People's Party)

Area
  - Total: 44 km^{2} (17 sq mi)
- Elevation: 948 m (3,110 ft)

Population (2025-01-01)
  - Total: 72
  - Density: 1.6/km^{2} (4.2/sq mi)
- Time zone: UTC+1 (CET)
  - Summer (DST): UTC+2 (CEST)
- Postal code: 37787

Pelayos is a municipality located in the province of Salamanca, Castile and León, Spain. As of 2016 the municipality has a population of 98 inhabitants.
