= Juan de Mesa =

Spanish Baroque sculptor (1583-1627)

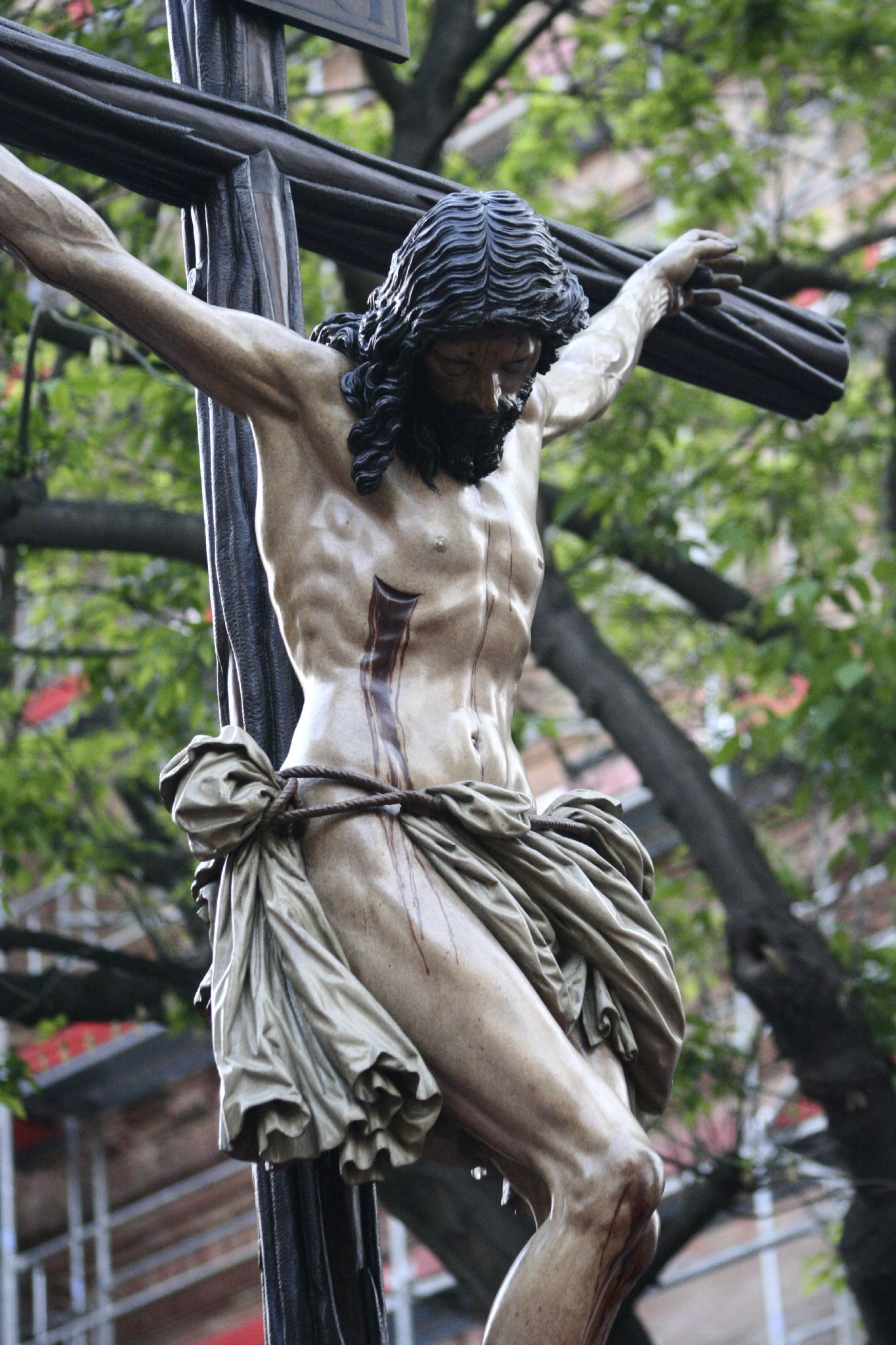
De Mesa's Cristo de la Buena Muerte.

Juan de Mesa y Velasco (1583–1627) was a Spanish Baroque sculptor. He was the creator of several of the effigies that are used in the procession during the Holy Week in Seville.

== Biography ==
De Mesa was born in Córdoba and baptized on 26 June 1583. He entered the workshop of Juan Martínez Montañés in Seville in 1606. He died in the city in 1627. His early death, coupled with the large gaps in his biography, has led to speculation that he suffered from a chronic disease such as tuberculosis.

Like his master, Montañés, de Mesa's works were realistic rather than imaginative in form, his sculptures closely replicate the human form. This was in line with the Catholic Church's aesthetic program for the visual arts following the Council of Trent, which sought to make the arts accessible to the poorly educated by using realistic forms.

Processional effigies make up the bulk of de Mesa's extant work and are still objects of devotion. These works include Cristo del Amor, Cristo de la Buena Muerte and Jesus del Gran Poder.

== See also ==
- Sevillian school of sculpture
