= Roque Balduque =

16th century sculptor

Roque Balduque (or Roque de Balduque) (died February 1561) was a sculptor and maker of altarpieces. Born at an unknown date in Bois-le-Duc (now 's-Hertogenbosch, capital of North Brabant in the Netherlands), he is known for his work in Spain in the last years of his life.

== Life ==
Balduque was married to a woman known as Isabel de Balduq; with a son, they settled in Seville in 1534. He is documented in 1554 as a carver and sculptor ("entallador e imaxinero") who has brought new Italian and Flemish concepts to Seville. His presumed relatives Juan Mateo, Pedro, Diego, and Andrés Bolduque had a sculptural studio on Medina de Rioseco (province of Valladolid), where they executed various projects for churches in and around Valladolid and Palencia.

Beginning in December 1554, Balduque began an important series of sculptures and altarpieces for parish churches in Seville, which accommodated two kinds of Marian images, ranging in style from Nordic primitivism to Flemish Mannerism. In Seville, he settled in the working-class neighborhood of La Magdalena.

After his death in February 1561, his widow entrusted his uncompleted projects to the Flemish sculptor Juan Giralte.

== Known and attributed works ==
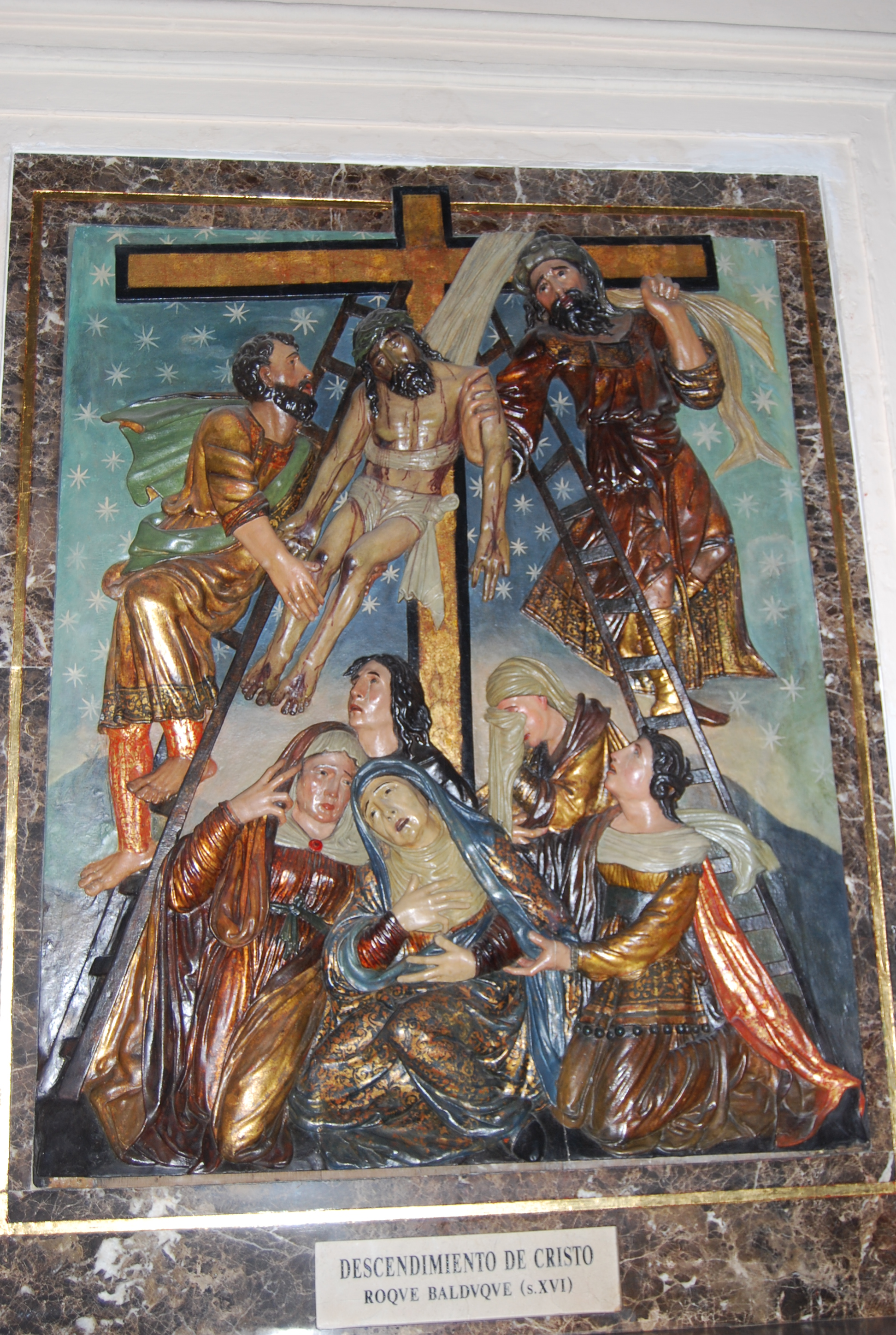
Surviving fragment of altarpiece, Church of John the Baptist, Chiclana (province of Cádiz, Spain.

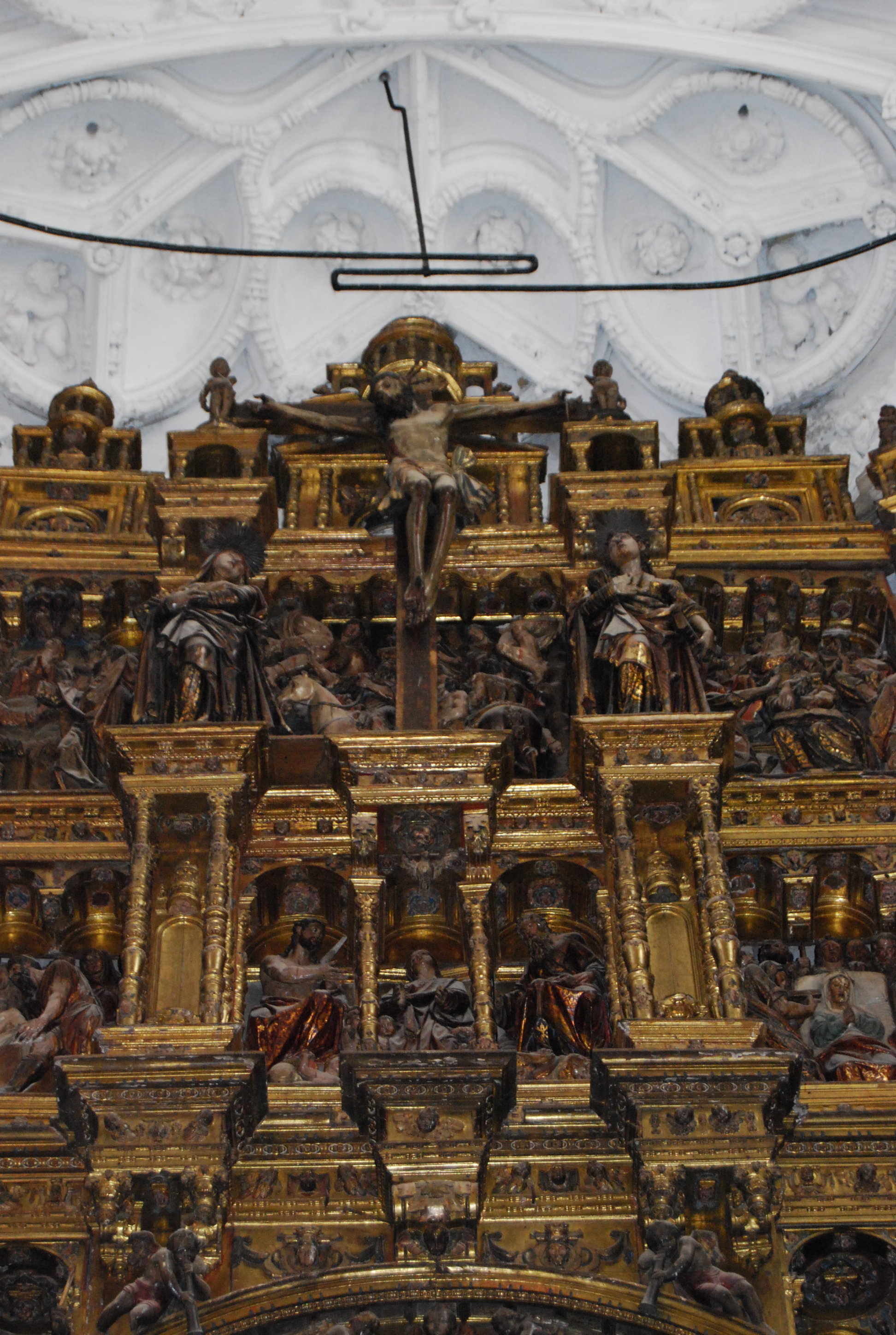
Calvary, upper portion of the Renaissance altarpiece of Santa María La Mayor La Coronada, Medina Sidonia.

Balduque collaborated on the main altarpiece of the Cathedral of Seville and, after that, the main altarpiece of the Church of Saint John the Baptist in Chiclana.

In 1554 he contracted for the sacramental altarpiece of the Parish Church of Santa María la Coronada in Medina Sidonia (Province of Cádiz). Five reliefs on the upper level of the altarpiece are his originals, as is the Calvary at the top, which his will mentions had been completed.

His most notable mannerist works are Nuestra Señora Reina de Todos los Santos ("Our Lady, Queen of All the Saints") and Nuestra Señora del Amparo ("Our Lady of Amparo"). The former is the patroness of the La Feria neighborhood of Seville, and presides over the basilical baldachin of the Parish of Omnium Sanctorum. Balduque sculpted in 1554 and sold it to the penitential confraternity of the same name, the Hermandad de Nuestra Señora Reina de Todos los Santos, for 23 ducats. The latter resides in the Church of Saint Mary Magdalene in Seville, and is associated with a penitential confraternity of the same name, the Hermandad de Nuestra Señora del Amparo. It is one of the few processional sculptures that have a variety of garments: there is one each in red, green, sky blue, and salmon pink. It is also one of the few such sculptures associated both with a confraternity and with a parish.

Between 1554 and 1556, Balduque also made sculptures and altarpieces for the Sevillian parishes of San Lorenzo, San Román, Santa Marina, San Gil, San Nicolás, San Vicente and San Juan de la Palma. Also in Seville are several other processional sculptures of his, all of the Virgin Mary, among them the Virgen de la Granada in the parish of San Lorenzo and the Virgen de la Rosa in the parish of San Vicente.

Another work attributed to Roque Balduque or pertaining to your work environment is the valuable statue of Our Lady of Light that venerates in the Cathedral of San Cristóbal de La Laguna in Tenerife (Spain). In the Cathedral of Lima in Peru is the image of Our Lady of Evangelization, Patroness of the Archdiocese of Lima, also made by Roque Balduque.
