= Testament and Death of Moses =

Fresco attributed to Luca Signorelli and Bartolomeo della Gatta

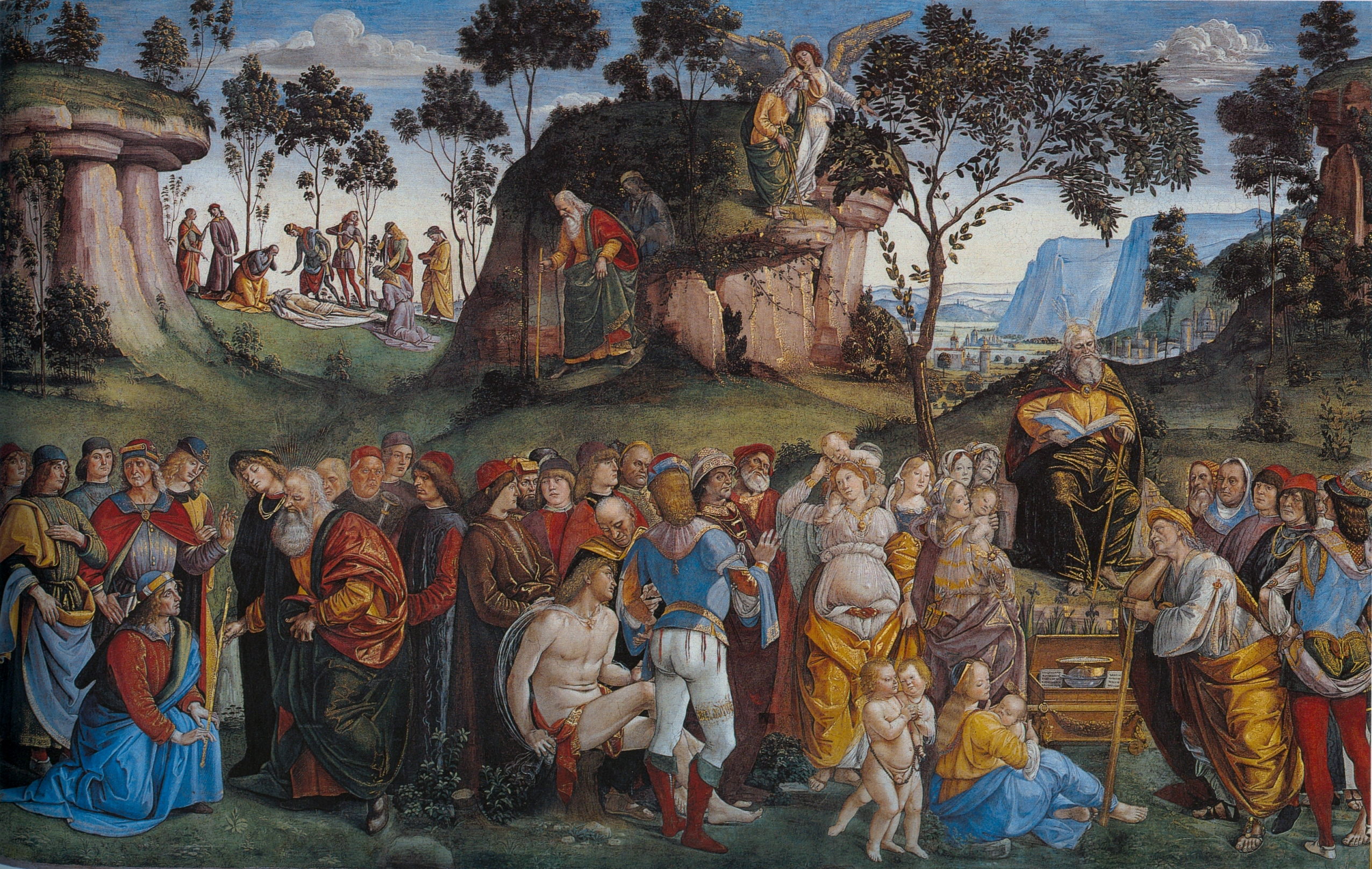
- Artist: Luca Signorelli and Bartolomeo della Gatta
- Year: 1482
- Type: Fresco
- Dimensions: 350 cm × 572 cm (140 in × 225 in)
- Location: Sistine Chapel; Rome

The Testament and Death of Moses is a fresco attributed to the Italian Renaissance painters Luca Signorelli and Bartolomeo della Gatta, executed in around 1482 and located in the Sistine Chapel, Rome.

== History ==
On 27 October 1480 a group of Florentine painters left for Rome, where they had been called as part of the reconciliation project between Lorenzo de' Medici, the de facto ruler of Florence, and Pope Sixtus IV. The Florentines started to work in the Sistine Chapel as early as the Spring of 1481, along with Pietro Perugino, who was already there. Neither Bartolomeo della Gatta nor Luca Signorelli (who was thirty at the time) appear in the official contracts signed between the Papal court and the painters, but they were most likely among the assistants of Perugino, who was the general superintendent of the works. Signorelli is mentioned in the Sistine Chapel after his master left in 1482, as the author of the Disputation over Moses' Body on the entrance wall (repainted by Matteo da Lecce in 1574 due to its poor state).

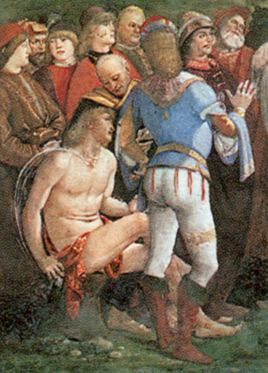
Detail of the fresco.

It has been supposed that Perugino provided at least the layout of the fresco, while its realization, basing on a comment by Giorgio Vasari, had been assigned traditionally to Signorelli. Studies by art historians such as Mario Salmi, reduced Signorelli's presence in the work, and attributed most of the painting to Bartolomeo della Gatta, a painter influenced by the purity of Piero della Francesca and the early Perugino.

The theme of the decoration was a parallel between the Stories of Moses and those of Christ, as a sign of continuity between the Old and the New Testament. A continuity also between the divine law of the Tables and the message of Jesus, who, in turn, chose Peter (the alleged first bishop of Rome) as his successor: this would finally result in a legitimation of the latter's successors, the popes of Rome.

== Description ==
The fresco portrays the last episode in Moses' life, in two sectors: a foreground one including two scenes, and a background one, with three further scenes and, on the right, a landscape. Moses is always recognizable through his yellow garments and the green cloak, as in the rest of the cycle. The artist made an extensive use of gold painting.

On the background Moses, on the Mount Nebo, is shown the Promised Land by an angel. Below, Moses descends from the mountain with the baton in his hand, similarly to Cosimo Rosselli's Descent from Mount Sinai nearby. In the foreground, on the right, is a 120-year-old Moses speaking at the crowd while holding the baton and a Holy Book: rays of light stem from his head. At his feet is the Ark of the Covenant, opened to show the Twelve Tables and the vase of the Manna. In the center, the procession includes a woman holding a child on her shoulders, wearing silk, an elegant youth portrayed from behind and a naked man sitting. The latter two characters are attributed to Luca Signorelli, as well as the man with a stick next the throne of Moses.

On the left is the appointment of Joshua as Moses' successor; the former kneels to receive the command baton, while the prophet has his cloak opened, showing a red-lined interior. Finally, on the left background, is the corpse of Moses on a shroud, surrounded by the dismayed Israelites.

== Sources ==
- Paolucci, Antonio (2004). "Luca Signorelli". I pittori del Rinascimento. Florence: Scala.
- De Vecchi, Pierluigi; Elda Cerchiari (1999). I tempi dell'arte, volume 2. Milan: Bompiani. ISBN 88-451-7212-0.
