= Last Supper (Rosselli) =

Fresco in the Sistine Chapel

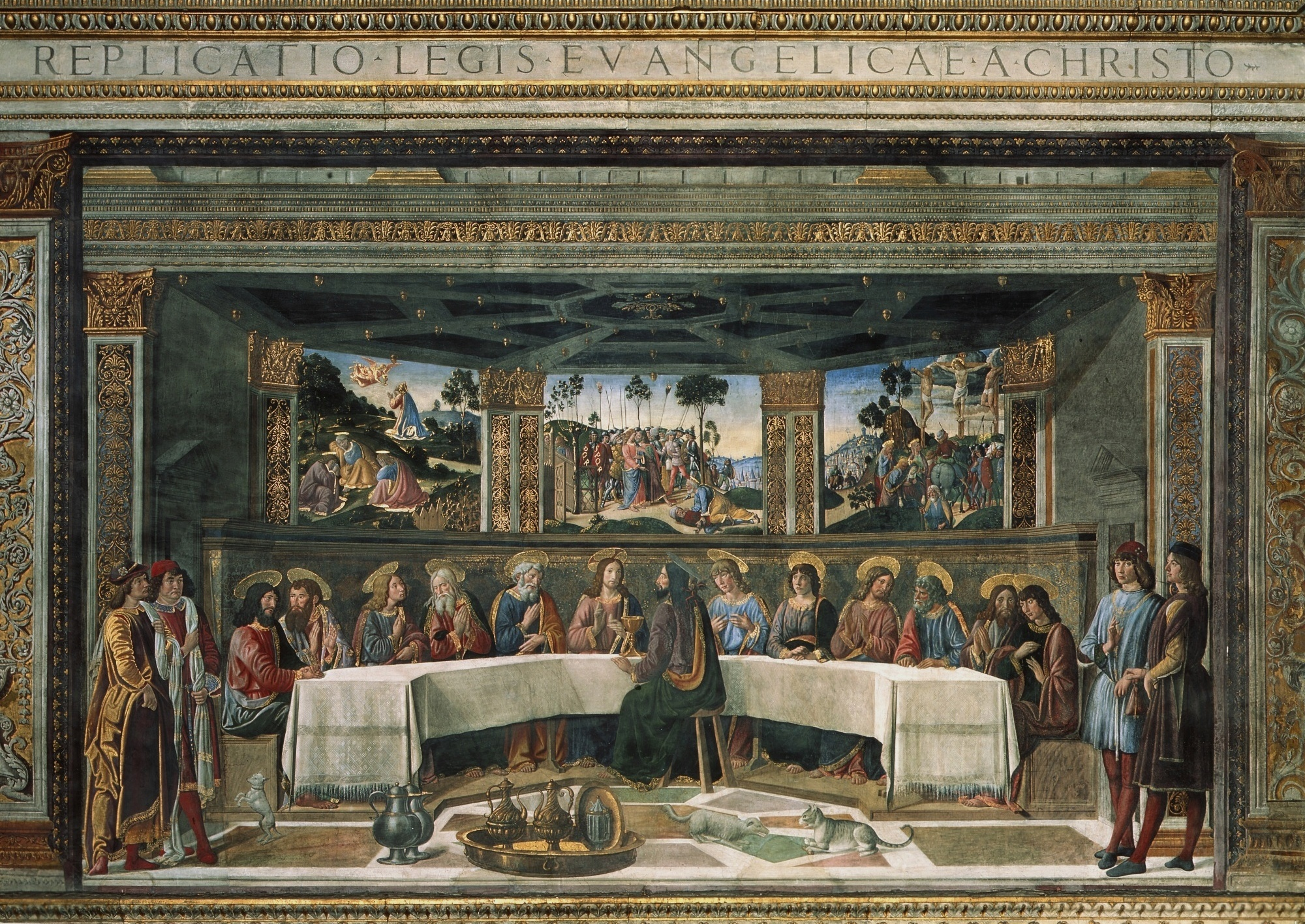
- Artist: Cosimo Rosselli
- Year: c. 1481–1482
- Type: Fresco
- Dimensions: 349 cm × 570 cm (137 in × 220 in)
- Location: Sistine Chapel; Rome

The Last Supper is a fresco by the Italian Renaissance painters Cosimo Rosselli and Biagio d'Antonio. Created during the years 1481–1482, it is located in the Sistine Chapel in Rome.

== History ==
On 27 October 1480 Rosselli, together with other Florentine painters, left for Rome, where he had been called as part of the reconciliation project between Lorenzo de' Medici, the de facto ruler of Florence, and Pope Sixtus IV. The Florentines started to work in the Sistine Chapel as early as the Spring of 1481, along with Pietro Perugino, who was already there.

The theme of the decoration was a parallel between the stories of Moses and those of Christ, as a sign of continuity between the Old and the New Testament, as well as between the divine law of the Tables and the message of Jesus, who had chosen Peter (the first bishop of Rome) as his successor: This would finally result in a legitimation of the latter's successors, the popes of Rome.

Due to the commission's size, the artists brought with them numerous assistants. Rosselli brought his son-in-law Piero di Cosimo. According to the Renaissance art historian Giorgio Vasari, Rosselli was considered one of the less gifted among the painters at the Sistine Chapel, and his paintings in the chapel were the subject of the other artists' irony. However, his sheer adoption of brilliant colors granted him the appreciation of the pope, who apparently, was not considered an art expert.

== Description ==
The scene is part of the Stories of Jesus cycle and, like the others, shows more than one episode at the same time. The frieze has the inscription REPLICATIO LEGIS EVANGELICAE A CHRISTO ('Repetition of the Evangelical Law by Christ'). The supper is set in a semi-circular apse, with a horseshoe-shaped table at whose center sits Jesus, the apostles at his side. Judas, as usual, is depicted on the side, from behind; the fighting cat and dog are elements which further stress his negative connotation. The scene shows the moment immediately after Jesus' annunciation that one apostle would betray him. His hearers' reactions include touching their own chests, or muttering to each other.

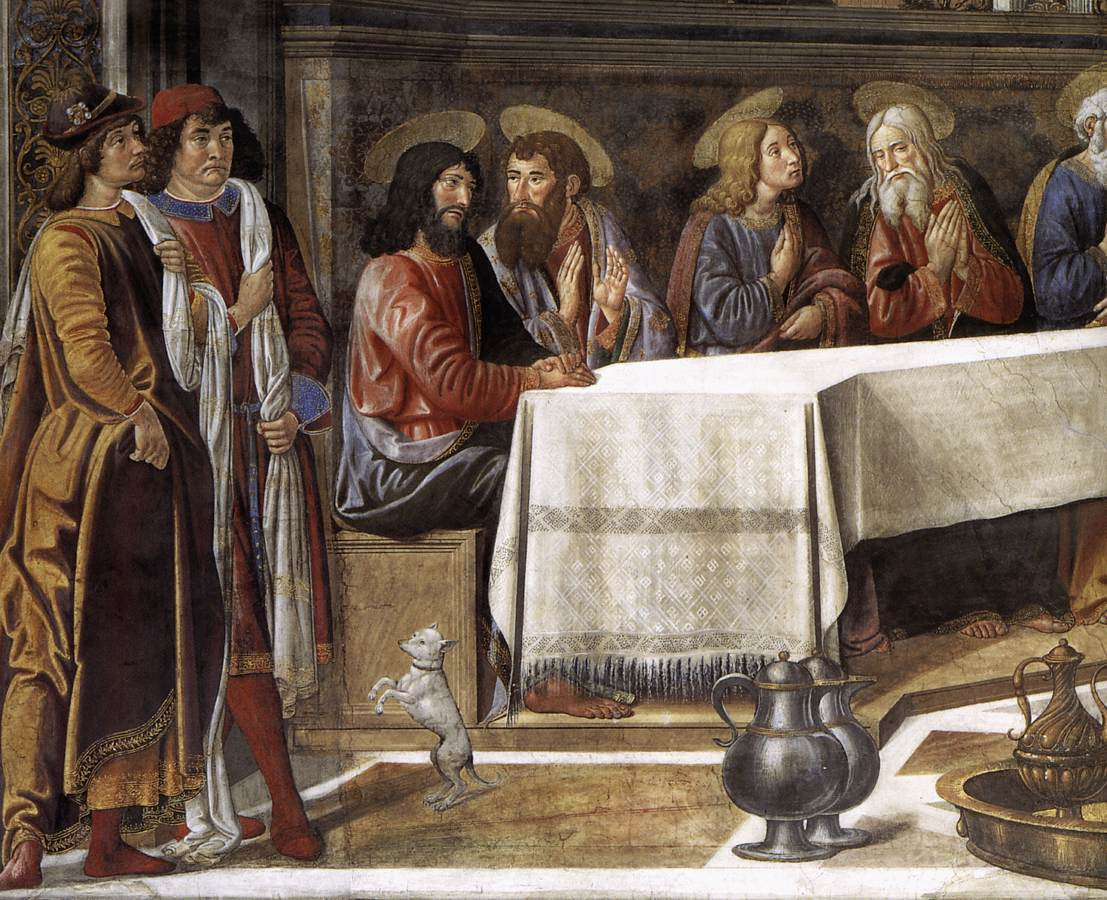
Detail.

The table has no meals, but a single chalice in front of Jesus; some gilded or silvered kitchenware is shown in the foreground, an example of still life inspired by contemporary Flemish painting and widespread in Florentine art at the time. At the sides, are two couples of figures dressing rich garments. Another dog is jumping on the left.

Within the three windows behind the table are three scenes of the Passion: the Prayer at Gethsemane, the Arrest of Jesus and the Crucifixion. These are attributed by some authorities to Biagio d'Antonio. Perugino used the same panel-within-a-panel effect in his later Last Supper.

== Sources ==
- Santi, Bruno (2001). "Botticelli". I protagonisti dell'arte italiana. Florence: Scala.
