= Beli dvor =

Palace in Belgrade, Serbia

Beli Dvor
- Бели двор
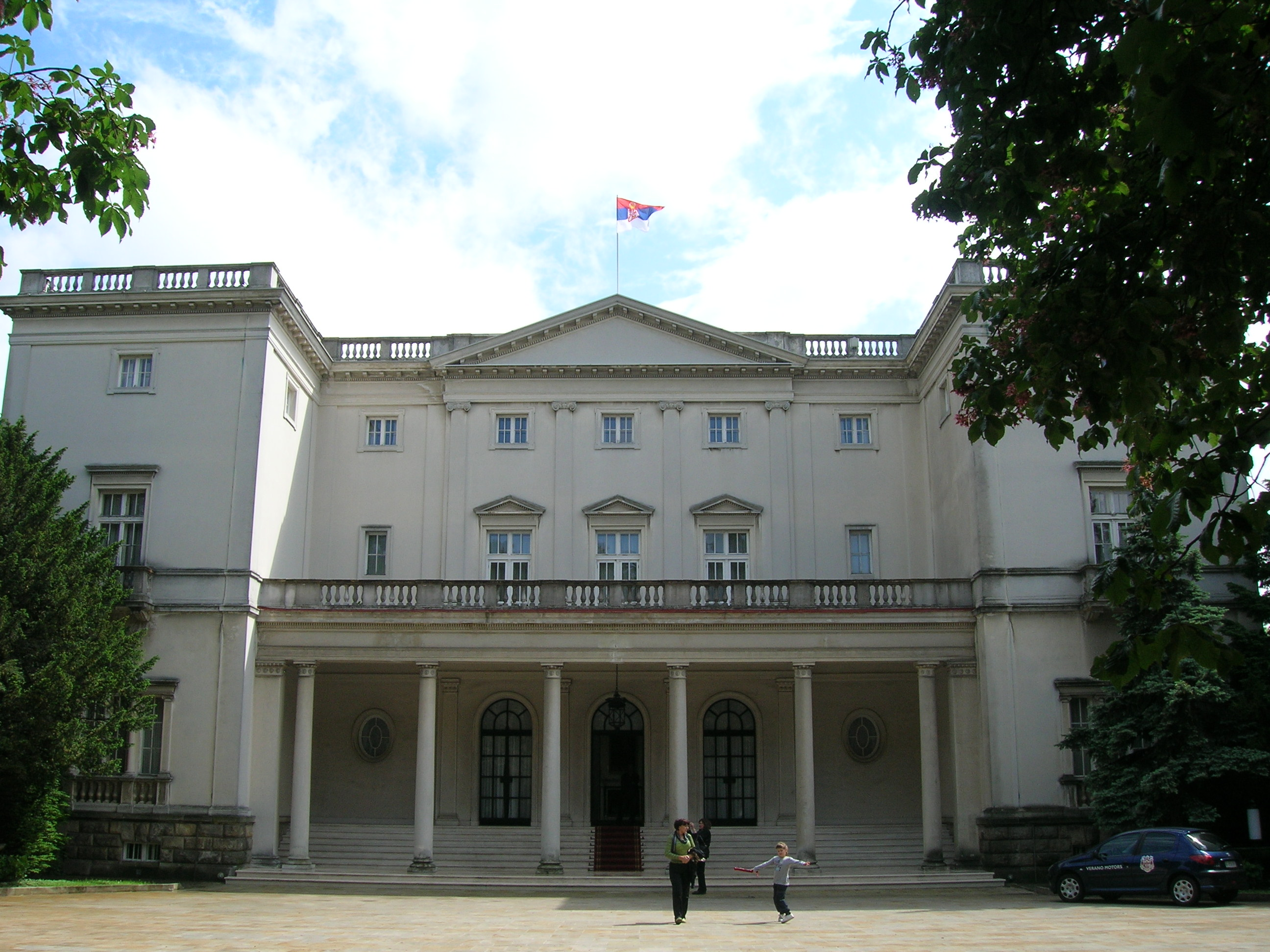
- Front view and main entrance

- Location within Belgrade

General information
- Architectural style: Neopalladian
- Location: Dedinje, Belgrade, Serbia
- Construction started: 1934
- Completed: 1937

Design and construction
- Architect: Aleksandar Đorđević

The Beli Dvor (Serbian: Бели двор, lit. "White Palace") is one of two residences of the Dedinje Royal Compound in the Dedinje neighborhood of Belgrade. It was the official residence of the Prince Regent Paul from 1934 to 1941.

== History ==
The palace was commissioned by and built with the personal funds of King Alexander I as the residence for his three sons: Crown Prince Peter (the future King Peter II and father of current Crown Prince Alexander), Prince Tomislav and Prince Andrew. Alexander I was assassinated in 1934 in Marseille during a state visit to France, in the same year that the construction of the palace began. Supervision of construction was overtaken by the Prince Regent Paul until its completion in 1937. The Queen Maria and her three sons, continued to reside at Kraljevski Dvor during this time. Prince Paul was the only member of the royal family to reside in the palace before the outbreak of the World War II and subsequent invasion of Yugoslavia.

Following the end of the war, the new communist government seized the assets and property of the royal family. The Beli Dvor was used by Yugoslav president, Josip Broz Tito, and later by the president of FR Yugoslavia, Slobodan Milošević, for official state functions and receptions of visiting foreign dignitaries. Milošević received U.S. envoy Richard Holbrook at the palace before the NATO bombing of Yugoslavia began; Milošević later officially resigned his presidency in front of the Main Hall's fireplace.

== Architecture ==
The palace was designed by architect Aleksandar Đorđević in a Neo-palladian style, inspired by 18th century English country houses such as Ditchley Park. Its interior was decorated with English Georgian and 19th century Russian antiques by the French design firm Maison Jansen, which later decorated the White House during the administration of John F. Kennedy.

== Art collection ==
Palace is housing notable art collection including paintings by Piero di Cosimo, Biagio d'Antonio, Nicolas Poussin (three paintings), Giovanni Cariani, Sébastien Bourdon, Albrecht Altdorfer, Palma Vecchio (two paintings), Carlo Caliari, Carel Fabritius, Simon Vouet, two paintings by Brueghel, Antonio Canaletto, Eugène Delacroix, Jean-Baptiste Carpeaux, Giuseppe Crespi, Nicolae Grigorescu, Franz Xaver Winterhalter, Eugène Fromentin, Gaspard Dughet, Richard Parkes Bonington, Đura Jakšić, Ivan Meštrović, Vlaho Bukovac and others. The green and white Sèvres porcelain service was purchased in 1932 in Paris from the Gallerie Charpentier. The service once belonged to the Count of Artois.

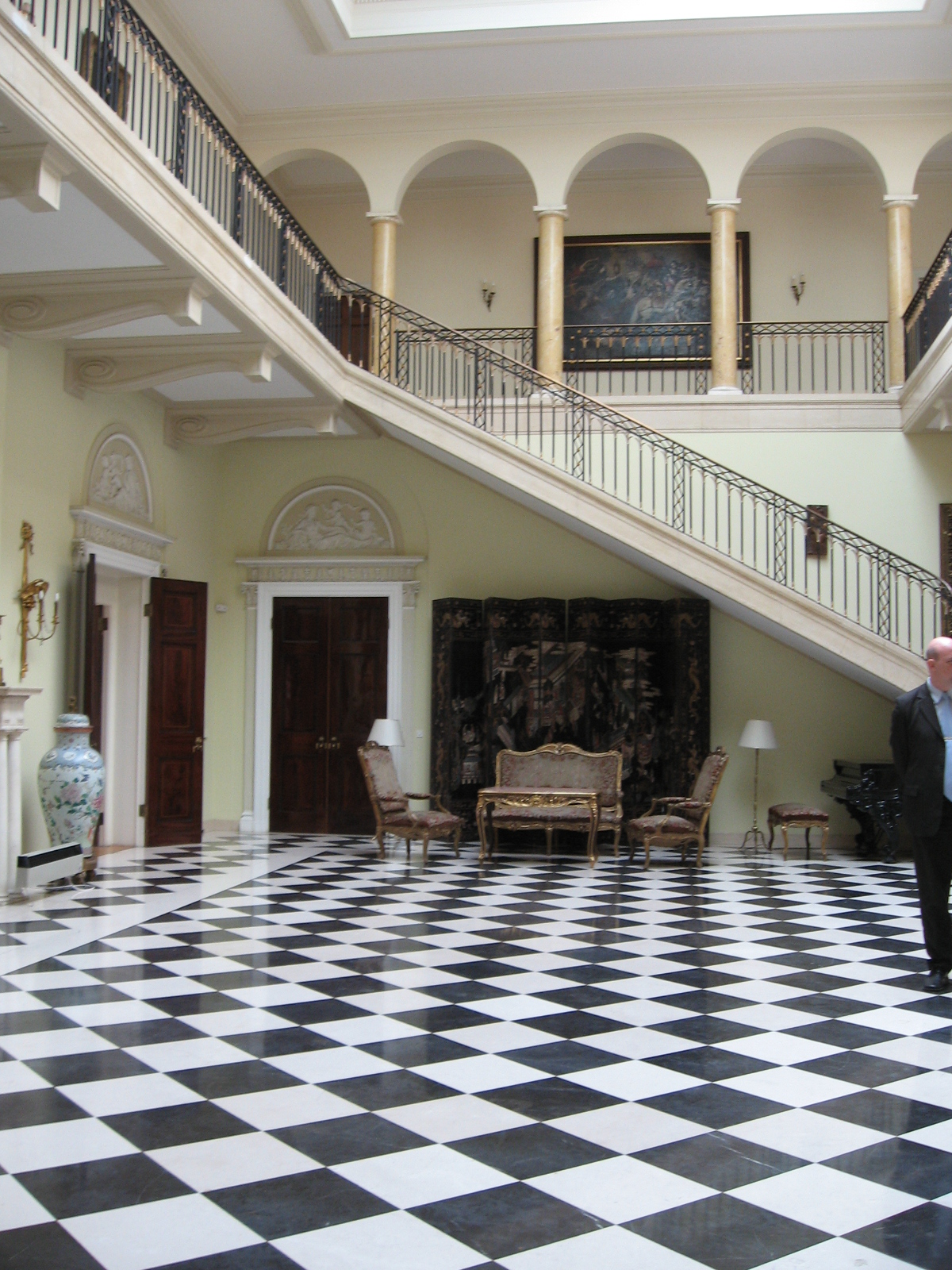
Main hall

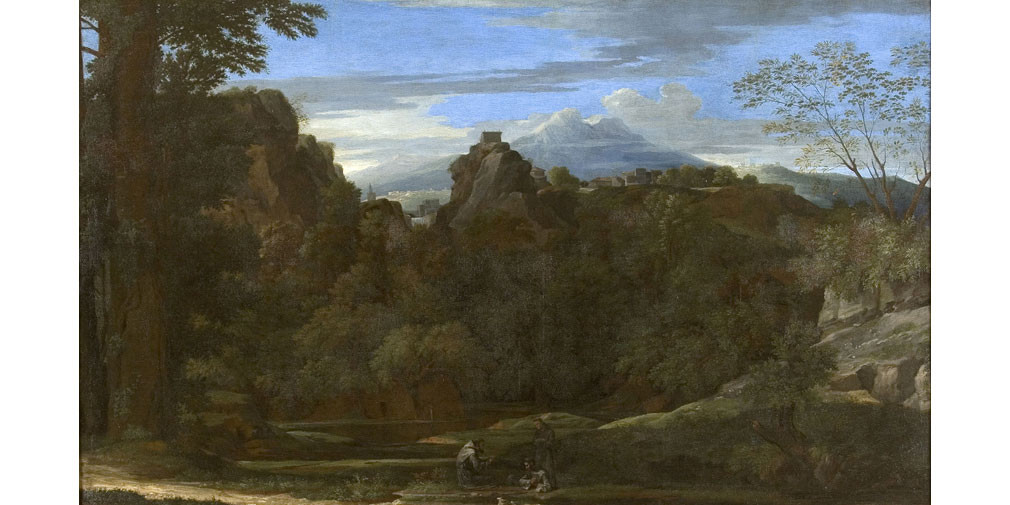
Nicolas Poussin's Landscape with Three Monks

- Piero di Cosimo, Forest Fire
- Raphael or Pietro Perugino Holy Family with young St John
- Domenico di Pace Beccafumi, Clelia's Escape
- Biagio d'Antonio, Madonna with Jesus and Angels
- Albrecht Altdorfer, Madonna Dream: Taking Maria to the Temple
- Andrea di Aloigi, The Worship of the Child
- Palma Vecchio, The Holy Family with St. Catherine, St. John and Donor and Self Portrait
- Richard Parkes Bonington, Loggia of the Imaginary Palace
- Carlo Caliari Decorating Bull
- Bernardino Licinio, Portrait of Noble Woman
- Giuseppe Crespi, Parable of the Prodigal Son
- Nicolas Chaperon, Allegory composition
- Nicolas Poussin, Adonis and Venus, Landscape with Three Monks and Landscape
- Sébastien Bourdon, Landscape with Remains
- Carel Fabritius attributed, Man with Flaute
- Melchior d'Hondecoeter, Different Birds
- Abraham Mignon, Vase with Flowers
- Charles Le Brun, Macedonian Army Battle
- Antonio Canaletto, Channel in Venice
- Augustin Pajou, Portrait Bust of Countess di Bari (sculpture)
- Eugène Delacroix, Toilete of Algerian Woman
- Alexander Roslin, Portrait of Grand Duchess Maria Feodorovna
- Ivan Aivazovsky, Walking on the Sea
- Jean-Francisque Millet, Landscape with antique figures and beggar
- Franz Xaver Winterhalter, Portrait of Maria Alexandrovna
- Nicolae Grigorescu, Portrait of girl with red headscarf
- Emmanuel Frémiet, St.George and Dragon (sculpture)
- Ivan Bilibin, The Tale of the Golden Cockerel and Fairy Tale about Emperor Sultane
- Georges Scott, Portrait of HM King Alexander I on the Horse
- Félix Ziem, Grande Channel
- Jean-Baptiste Carpeaux, African Female Slave (sculpture)
- Vlastislav Hofman, Girl
- Rihard Jakopič, Girl with the lamb
- Gojmir Anton Kos, Girl
- Vlaho Bukovac, Purple Dream, The White Slave
- Paja Jovanović, Motive from Morocco and Portrait of King Alexander I Karadjordjevic
- Ivan Meštrović, Sfinga, Njegoš, Miloš Obilić, Self Portrait

== See also ==
- List of Serbian royal residences
- List of official residences of Serbia
