= Biagio d'Antonio =

Italian painter

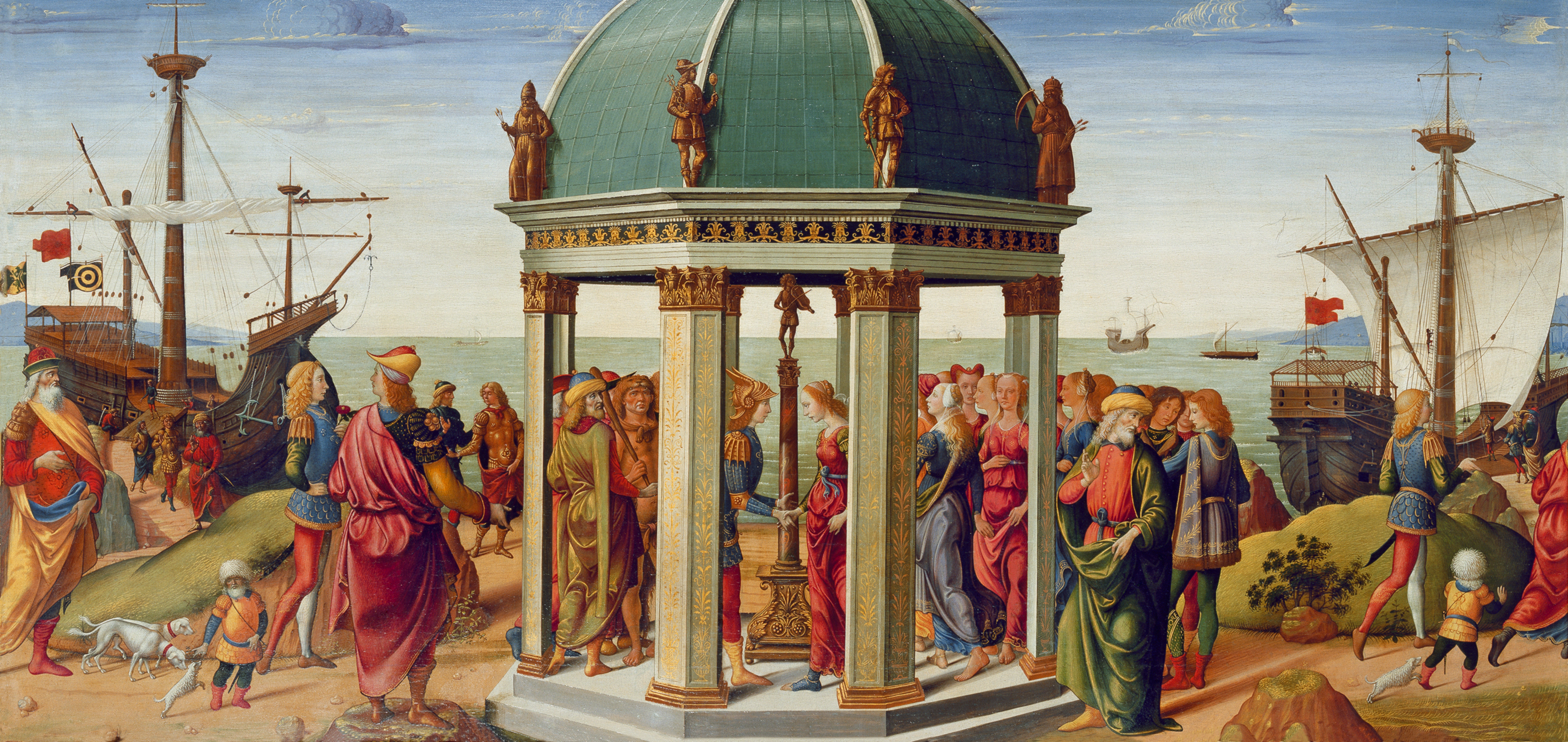
The Betrothal of Jason and Medea, 1487. Paris, Musée des Arts Décoratifs.

Biagio d'Antonio (1446 – 1 June 1516), also known as Biagio d'Antonio Tucci, was an Italian Renaissance painter active in Florence, Faenza, and Rome. He painted altarpieces, portraits, and many decorated marriage chests (cassoni), and worked on the wall frescoes of the Sistine Chapel.

== Name and identity ==
For centuries his works were attributed to other painters, including the Faenza painters Andrea Utili and "Giovanni Battista Utili", and Benedetto Ghirlandaio. His body of work was reconstructed from documents in Faenza published in 1935. A catasto (land registry) declaration gives his surname as Tucci.

== Life and career ==
=== Florence ===
Biagio was born in Florence, the son of an embroiderer. He trained under Cosimo Rosselli and was registered as a painter with the Compagnia di San Luca, the Florentine artists' guild, in 1472. After a brief partnership with Jacopo del Sellaio, he joined the workshop of Andrea del Verrocchio. His Madonna and Child with Saints for the church of San Domenico del Maglio, now in the Museum of Fine Arts, Budapest, may have been painted to a design by Verrocchio. In 1472 Biagio, Sellaio, and the carpenter Zanobi di Domenico made a pair of marriage chests for the wedding of the merchant Lorenzo Morelli and Viaggia Nerli. The Morelli-Nerli chests, now in the Courtauld Gallery, London, are unusual in surviving as a pair. Biagio painted cassone panels throughout his career, combining lively narrative with detailed costumes and armour.

=== Faenza ===
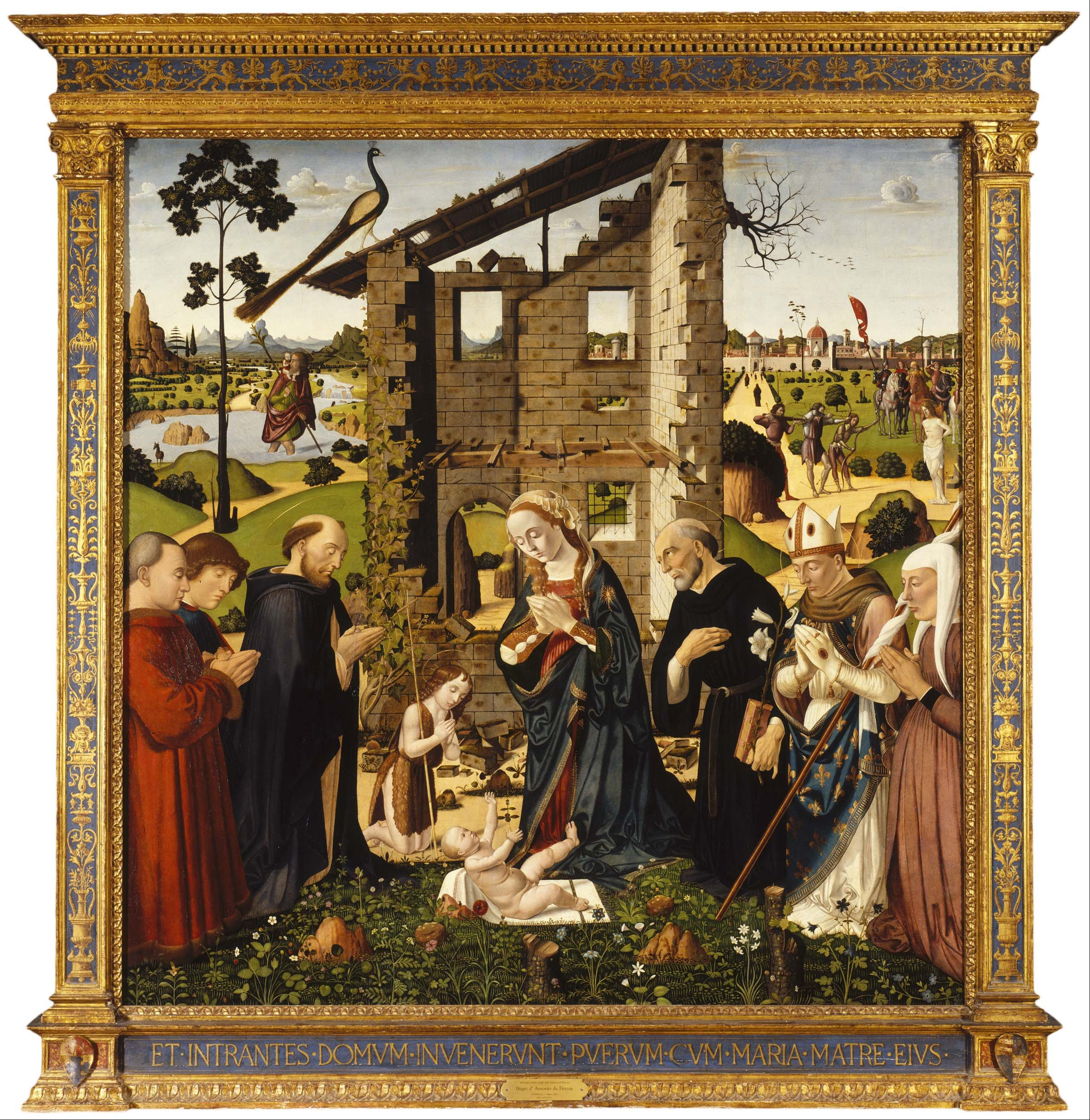
The Adoration of the Child with Saints and Donors, c. 1476, from the Ragnoli altarpiece (Philbrook Museum of Art)

From the mid-1470s he also worked in Faenza, for religious orders and for local patrons such as Niccolò Ragnoli, treasurer to Carlo II Manfredi. The first document recording him there dates from 28 June 1476. The central panel of his altarpiece for Ragnoli in the church of San Michele, depicting the Nativity with Saints and the Ragnoli Family as Donors, is now in the Kress Collection at the Philbrook Museum of Art, Tulsa, Oklahoma. In 1483 the Dominicans of Faenza commissioned the altarpiece for the high altar of Sant'Andrea, identified with the triptych now in the Pinacoteca Comunale of Faenza.

=== Rome and the Sistine Chapel ===
In 1481 and 1482 he worked with Pietro Perugino, Domenico Ghirlandaio, Sandro Botticelli, and Cosimo Rosselli on the frescoes of the side walls of the Sistine Chapel. The Crossing of the Red Sea is considered entirely his work.

=== Later career ===
In 1487 he collaborated with Bartolomeo di Giovanni, Pietro del Donzello, and Domenico Ghirlandaio on a set of panels (a tondo by Ghirlandaio and three wainscot panels by the others) for the wedding chamber of Lorenzo Tornabuoni and Giovanna degli Albizzi. Biagio's panel from this cycle, depicting the Betrothal of Jason and Medea, is now at the Musée des Arts Décoratifs, Paris. He continued to work for patrons in Faenza. On 9 November 1504 Antonia, widow of a member of the Bazzolini family, commissioned an altarpiece from him for the Bazzolini chapel in the Franciscan church, identified with the panel now in the Pinacoteca of Faenza. In 1504 he was also a member of the commission of Florence's leading artists that chose where Michelangelo's David should be displayed.

Later works include the Madonna and Child with Saints Francis and Mary Magdalene for San Pancrazio, Florence (now at San Francesco in San Casciano in Val di Pesa; the predella of this work is at the Accademia Etrusca, Cortona). He died in Florence on 1 June 1516.

== Selected works ==
Madonna Worshipping the Child and an Angel (c. 1475) (São Paulo Museum of Art, São Paulo)

- Madonna and Child, Angels and Saints Dominic, Andrew, John the Evangelist and Thomas Aquinas. Pinacoteca Comunale, Faenza.
- Madonna and Child, Two Angels and Saints John the Evangelist and Anthony of Padua. Pinacoteca Comunale, Faenza.
- St. Peter. Pinacoteca Comunale, Faenza.
- Madonna with Jesus and Angels. Beli Dvor, Belgrade.
- Annunciation. Pinacoteca Comunale, Faenza.
- Portrait of a Young Man, c. 1470. Metropolitan Museum of Art, New York.
- The Triumph of Camillus, c. 1470/1475. National Gallery of Art, Washington, D.C.
- Madonna Worshipping the Child and an Angel, c. 1475. São Paulo Museum of Art, São Paulo.
- Portrait of a Boy, c. 1476–1480. National Gallery of Art, Washington, D.C.
- Madonna and Child with Saint John the Baptist, Musée des Beaux-Arts de Lyon
- Virgin and Child with St John the Baptist, St Peter and Two Musician Angels, c. 1465 Museum voor Schone Kunsten, Ghent

== Sources ==
- Bartoli, Roberta. "Biagio d'Antonio (Tucci)". Grove Art Online. Oxford University Press.
- Bartoli, Roberta. Biagio d'Antonio. Milan: Electa, 1999.
- Bryan, Michael (1889). Walter Armstrong; Robert Edmund Graves (eds.). Dictionary of Painters and Engravers, Biographical and Critical. Vol. II L-Z. London: George Bell and Sons. p. 590.
