= Sistine Chapel =

Chapel in the Apostolic Palace, Vatican City

Sistine Chapel; Sacellum Sixtinum (Latin); Cappella Sistina (Italian)
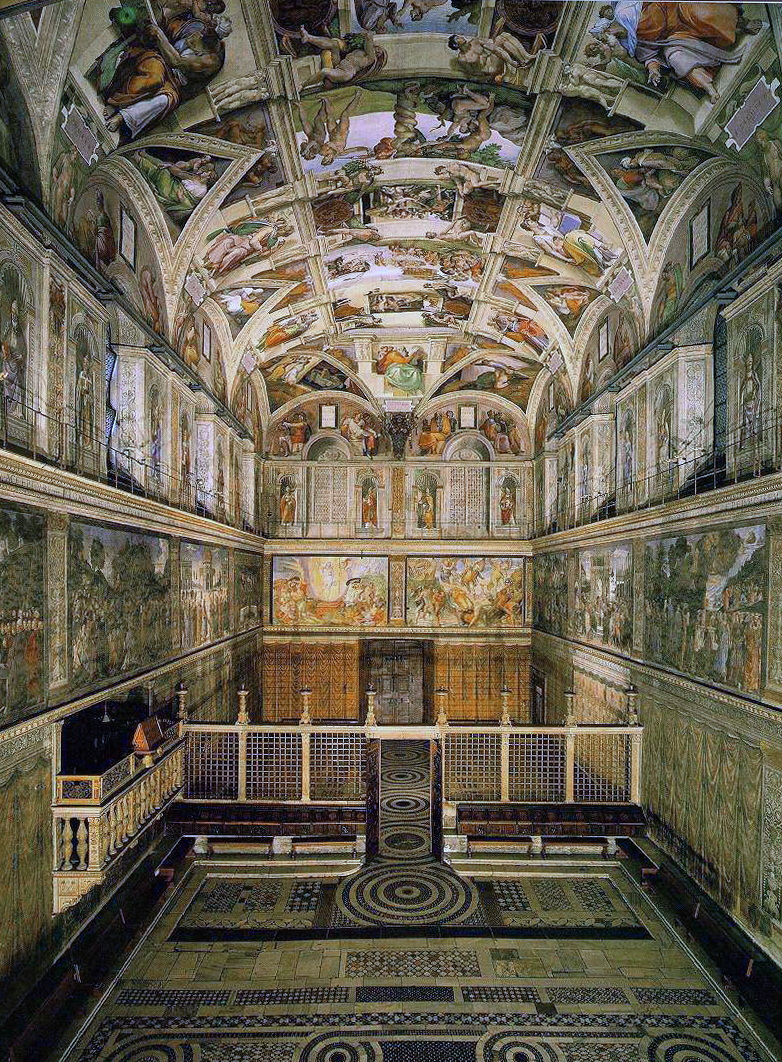
- East side of the Chapel, from the altar end

- Location on a map of Vatican City

Religion
- Affiliation: Roman Catholic
- Diocese: Diocese of Rome
- Ecclesiastical or organisational status: Papal oratory
- Leadership: Leo XIV
- Year consecrated: 15 August 1483

Location
- Location: Vatican City
- Coordinates: 41°54′11″N 12°27′16″E

Architecture
- Architects: Baccio Pontelli, Giovanni de Dolci
- Type: Church
- Groundbreaking: 1473
- Completed: 1481

Specifications
- Length: 40.9 metres (134 ft)
- Width (nave): 13.4 metres (44 ft)
- Height (max): 20.7 metres (68 ft)
- UNESCO World Heritage Site
- Official name: Vatican City
- Type: Cultural
- Criteria: i, ii, iv, vi
- Designated: 1984
- Reference no.: 286
- State Party: Holy See
- Region: Europe and North America

Website
- mv.vatican.va

Rome

The Sistine Chapel (/ˈsɪstiːn/ SIST-een; Latin: Sacellum Sixtinum; Italian: Cappella Sistina [kapˈpɛlla siˈstiːna]) is a chapel in the Apostolic Palace, the pope's official residence in Vatican City. Originally known as the Cappella Magna ('Great Chapel'), it takes its name from Pope Sixtus IV, who had it built between 1473 and 1481. Since that time, it has served as a place of both religious and functionary papal activity. Today, it is the site of the papal conclave, the process by which a new pope is selected. The chapel's fame lies mainly in the frescoes that decorate its interior, most particularly the Sistine Chapel ceiling and The Last Judgment, both by Michelangelo.

During the reign of Sixtus IV, a team of Renaissance painters including Sandro Botticelli, Pietro Perugino, Pinturicchio, Domenico Ghirlandaio and Cosimo Rosselli, created a series of frescoes depicting the Life of Moses and the Life of Christ, offset by papal portraits above and trompe-l'œil drapery below. They were completed in 1482, and on 15 August 1483 Sixtus IV celebrated the first mass in the Sistine Chapel for the Feast of the Assumption, during which the chapel was consecrated and dedicated to the Virgin Mary.

Between 1508 and 1512, under the patronage of Pope Julius II, Michelangelo painted the chapel's ceiling, a project that changed the course of Western art and is regarded as one of the major artistic accomplishments of human civilization. In a different political climate, after the Sack of Rome, he returned and, between 1535 and 1541, painted The Last Judgment for popes Clement VII and Paul III. The fame of Michelangelo's paintings has drawn multitudes of visitors to the chapel since they were revealed five centuries ago.

== History ==
While known as the location of papal conclaves, the primary function of the Sistine Chapel is as the chapel of the Papal Chapel (Cappella Pontificia), one of the two bodies of the papal household, called until 1968 the Papal Court (Pontificalis Aula). At the time of Pope Sixtus IV in the late 15th century, the Papal Chapel comprised about 200 people, including clerics, officials of the Vatican and distinguished laity. There were 50 occasions during the year on which it was prescribed by the Papal Calendar that the whole Papal Chapel should meet. Of these 50 occasions, 35 were masses, of which 8 were held in basilicas, in general St. Peter's, and were attended by large congregations. These included the Christmas Day and Easter masses at which the Pope himself was the celebrant. The other 27 masses could be held in a smaller, less public space, for which the Cappella Maggiore was used before it was rebuilt on the same site as the Sistine Chapel.

The Cappella Maggiore derived its name, the Greater Chapel, from the fact that there was another chapel also in use by the Pope and his retinue for daily worship. At the time of Pope Sixtus IV, this was the Chapel of Pope Nicholas V, which had been decorated by Fra Angelico. The Cappella Maggiore is recorded as existing in 1368. According to a communication from Andreas of Trebizond to Pope Sixtus IV, by the time of its demolition to make way for the present chapel, the Cappella Maggiore was in a ruinous state with its walls leaning.

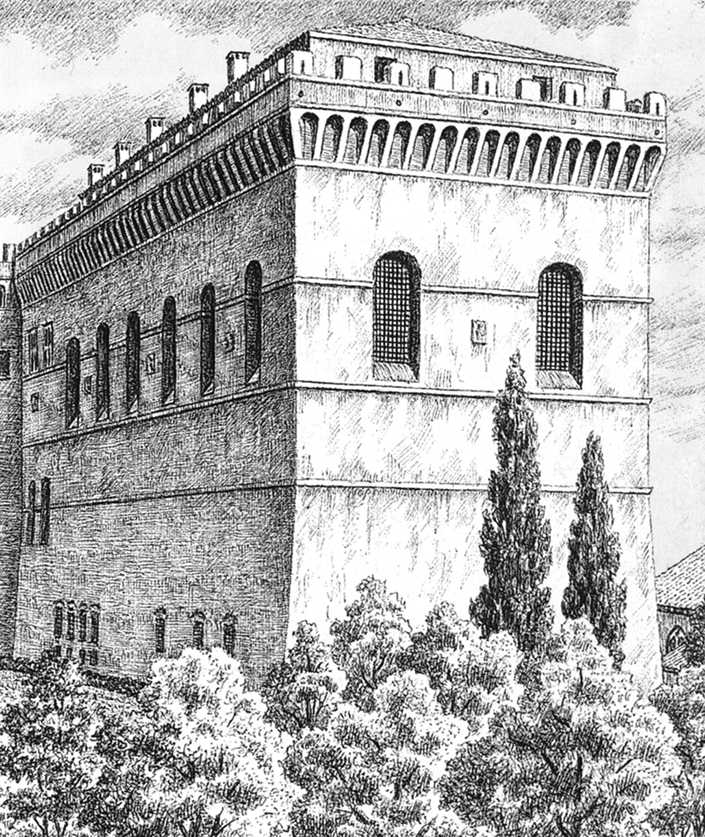
The Sistine Chapel as it may have appeared in the 15th century (19th-century drawing)

The present chapel, on the site of the Cappella Maggiore, was designed by Baccio Pontelli for Pope Sixtus IV, for whom it is named, and built under the supervision of Giovannino de Dolci between 1473 and 1481. The proportions of the present chapel appear to closely follow those of the original. After its completion, the chapel was decorated with frescoes by a number of the most famous artists of the High Renaissance, including Sandro Botticelli, Domenico Ghirlandaio, Pietro Perugino, and Michelangelo.

The first mass in the Sistine Chapel was celebrated on 15 August 1483, the Feast of the Assumption, at which ceremony the chapel was consecrated and dedicated to the Virgin Mary.

The Sistine Chapel has maintained its function to the present day and continues to host the important services of the Papal Calendar, unless the Pope is travelling. There is a permanent choir, the Sistine Chapel Choir, for whom much original music has been written, the most famous piece being Gregorio Allegri's Miserere.

=== Papal conclave ===
One of the functions of the Sistine Chapel is as a venue for the election of each successive pope in a conclave of the College of Cardinals. On the occasion of a conclave, a chimney is installed in the roof of the chapel, from which smoke arises as a signal. If white smoke appears, a new Pope has been elected. If the smoke is black, no candidate has received the required two-thirds vote, and no successful election has yet occurred. The white smoke is created by burning the ballots alone, while the black smoke is created by burning the ballots with wet straw. Chemical additives are also used for both colors.

The first papal conclave to be held at the Sistine Chapel was the conclave of 1492, which took place from 6 to 11 August and saw the election of Pope Alexander VI.

The conclave also provided for the cardinals a space in which they could hear mass, and in which they could eat, sleep, and pass time attended by servants. From 1455, conclaves have been held at the Vatican Palace; until the Great Schism, they were held at the Dominican convent of Santa Maria sopra Minerva. Since 1996, John Paul II's Apostolic Constitution Universi Dominici gregis requires the cardinals to be lodged at the Domus Sanctae Marthae during a papal conclave, but to continue to vote in the Sistine Chapel.

Canopies for each cardinal-elector were once used during conclaves—a sign of equal dignity. After the new Pope accepted his election, he would give his new name; at this time, the other Cardinals would tug on a rope attached to their seats to lower their canopies. Until reforms instituted by Pius X, the canopies were of different colours to designate which cardinals had been appointed by which Pope. Paul VI abolished the canopies altogether, since, under his papacy, the population of the College of Cardinals had increased so much to the point that they would need to be seated in rows of two against the walls, making the canopies obstruct the view of the cardinals in the back row. Ahead of a conclave taking place to preserve the integrity of the marble floor on the Sistine Chapel, carpenters install a slightly elevated wooden floor alongside a wooden ramp in the entrance for those Cardinals who for one reason or another need to be transported in a wheelchair. Underneath the raised floor is placed electronic signal jamming equipment, to prevent the sending of messages into or out of the conclave, thus protecting its secrecy.

Seagulls have been seen at the chimney of the Sistine Chapel during the 2013 and 2025 conclave, the former being called religious symbolism. The seagulls received attention from social media.

== Architecture ==
=== Structure ===
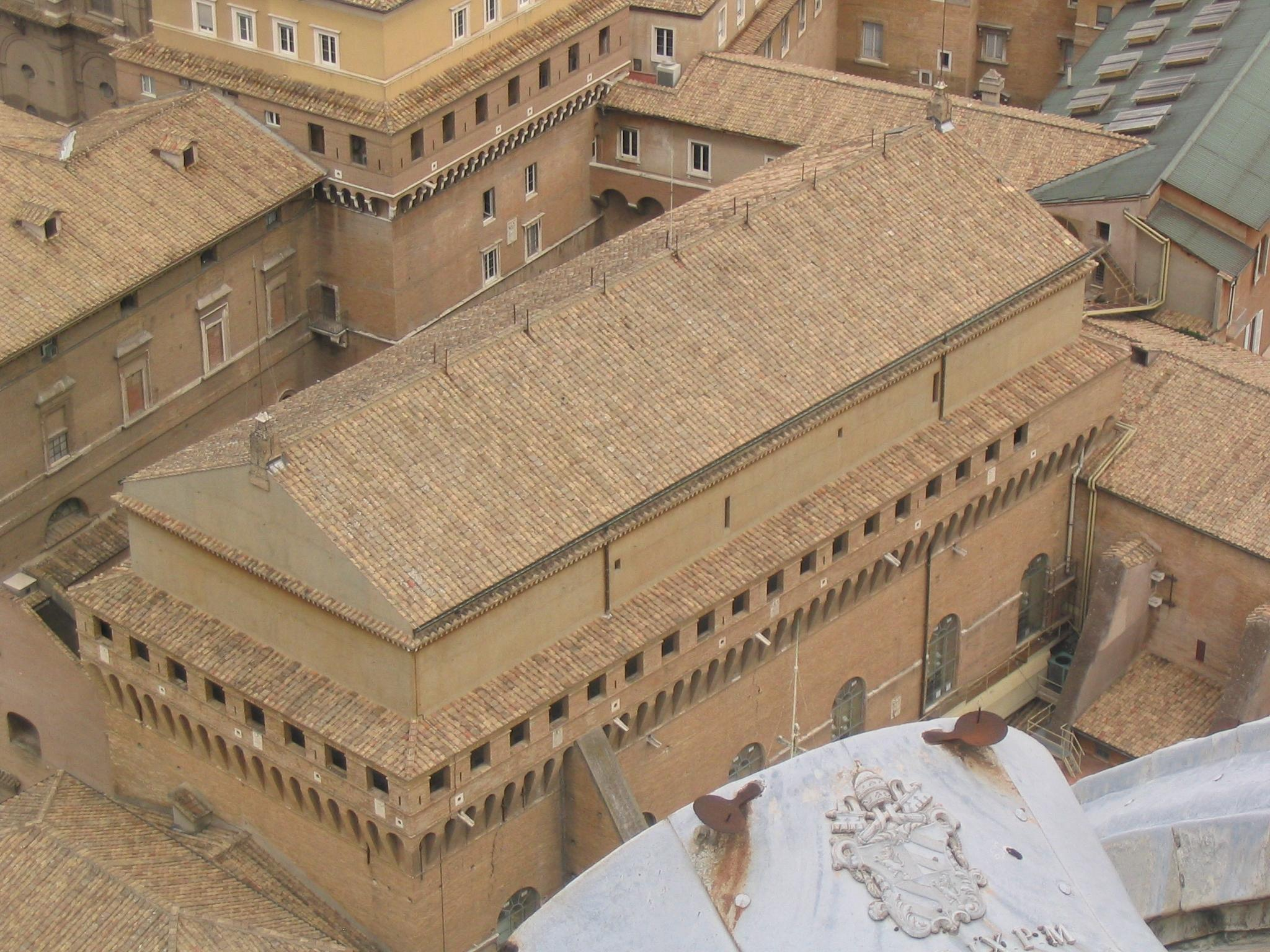
Exterior of the Sistine Chapel.

The chapel is about 35 metres (118 feet) long and 14 m (46 ft) wide, with the ceiling rising to about 20 m (66 ft) above the main floor.

Its exterior is unadorned by architectural or decorative details, as is common in many Italian churches of the Medieval and Renaissance eras. It has no exterior façade or exterior processional doorways, as the ingress has always been from internal rooms within the Apostolic Palace (Papal Palace), and the exterior can be seen only from nearby windows and light-wells in the palace. Subsidence and cracking of masonry also have affected the Cappella Maggiore, necessitating the building of very large buttresses to brace the exterior walls. The accretion of other buildings has further altered the exterior appearance of the chapel.

The building is divided into three stories of which the lowest is a very tall basement level with several utilitarian windows and a doorway giving onto the exterior court. Internally, the basement is robustly vaulted to support the chapel. The building had six tall arched windows down each side and two at either end, several of which have been blocked. Above the vault is a third story with wardrooms for guards. At this level, an open projecting gangway was constructed, which encircled the building supported on an arcade springing from the walls. The gangway has been roofed as it was a continual source of water leaking into the vault of the chapel.

=== Interior of the Sistine Chapel ===
The general proportions of the chapel use the length as the unit of measurement. This has been divided by three to get the width and by two to get the height. Maintaining the ratio, there were six windows down each side and two at either end. Defined proportions were a feature of Renaissance architecture and reflected the growing interest in the Classical heritage of Rome.

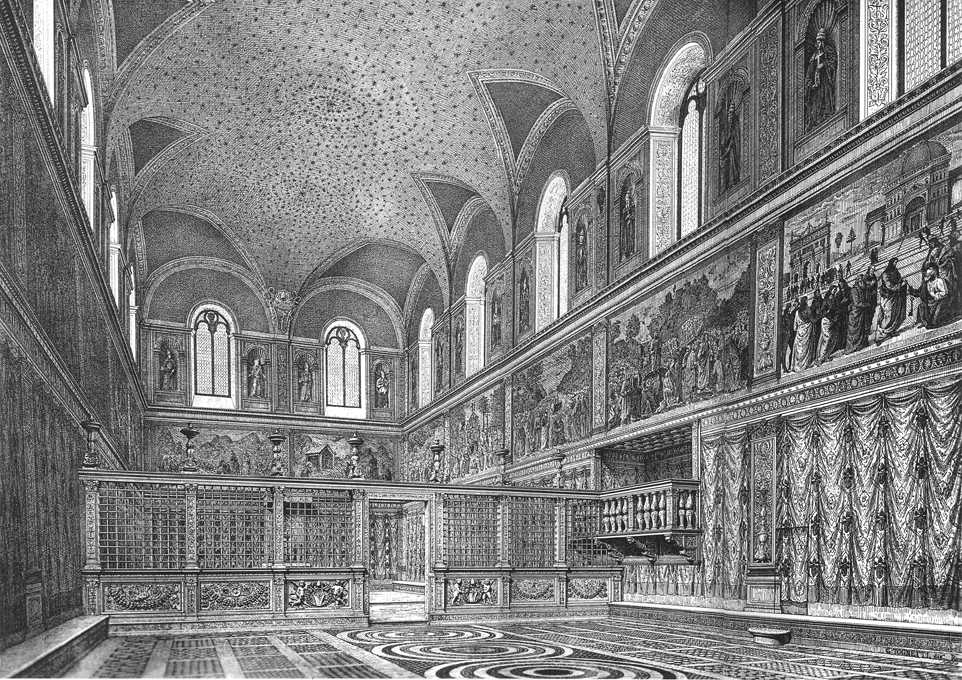
A reconstruction of the appearance of the west Wall chapel in the 1480s, prior to the painting of the ceiling.

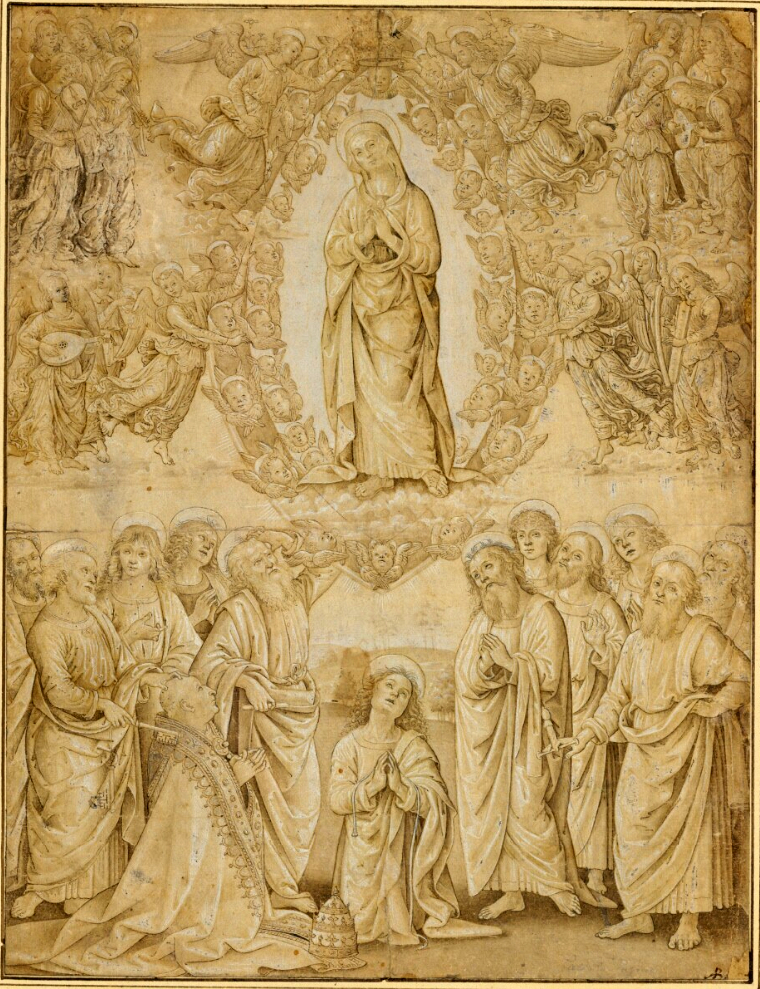
Drawing by Pinturicchio of Perugino's lost Assumption in the Sistine Chapel.

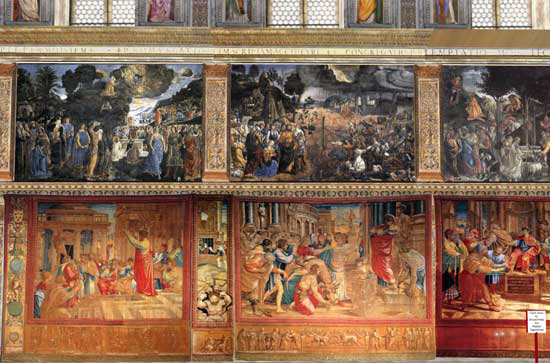
Raphael tapestries in the Sistine Chapel

The ceiling of the chapel is a shallow cross vault (or flattened groin vault), springing from a continuous string course that encircles the walls at the level of the window arches. This main vault is intersected transversely by smaller vaults above each window, creating a rhythmic division of the ceiling’s lower sections into a series of spandrels and lunettes. These elements rise from shallow pilasters positioned between the windows and contribute to the overall architectural framework of the painted scheme. The four curved triangular sections at the corners of the vault—though not true pendentives in structural terms—are sometimes referred to as pendentives in art historical literature, owing to their similar shape and transitional function. The cross vault was originally painted brilliant-blue and dotted with gold stars, to the design of Piermatteo Lauro de' Manfredi da Amelia. The pavement is in opus alexandrinum, a decorative style using marble and coloured stone in a pattern that reflects the earlier proportion in the division of the interior and also marks the processional way from the main door, used by the Pope on important occasions such as Palm Sunday.

A screen, or transenna, in marble by Mino da Fiesole, Andrea Bregno, and Giovanni Dalmata divides the chapel into two parts. Originally these made equal space for the members of the Papal Chapel within the sanctuary near the altar and the pilgrims and townsfolk without. However, with growth in the number of those attending the Pope, the screen was moved giving a reduced area for the faithful laity. The transenna is surmounted by a row of ornate candlesticks, once gilt, and has a wooden door, where once there was an ornate door of gilded wrought iron. The sculptors of the transenna also provided the cantoria or projecting choir gallery.

== Decoration ==
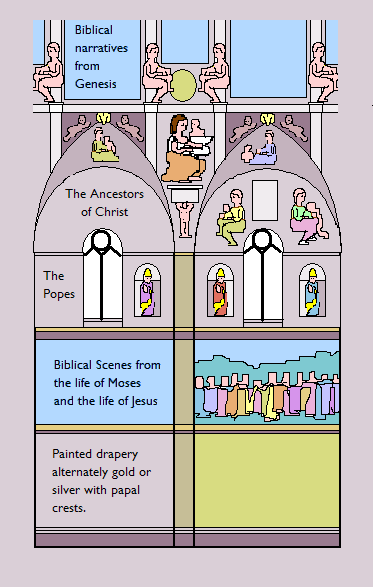
Diagram of part of the vertical fresco decoration of the Sistine Chapel.

=== History ===
The first stage in the decoration of the Sistine Chapel was the painting of the ceiling in blue, studded with gilt stars, and with decorative borders around the architectural details of the spandrels. This was entirely replaced when Michelangelo came to work on the ceiling in 1508.

Of the present scheme of frescos, the earliest part is that of the side walls. They are divided into three main tiers. The central tier of the walls has two cycles of paintings, which complement each other, The Life of Moses and The Life of Christ. They were commissioned in 1480 by Pope Sixtus IV and executed by Domenico Ghirlandaio, Sandro Botticelli, Pietro Perugino, Cosimo Rosselli and their workshops. They originally ran all round the walls, but have since been replaced on both end walls.

The project was perhaps supervised by Perugino, who arrived at the chapel prior to the Florentines. It is probable that the commission of Ghirlandaio, Botticelli and Roselli was part of a reconciliation project between Lorenzo de' Medici, the de facto ruler of Florence, and Pope Sixtus IV. The Florentines started to work in the Sistine Chapel in the spring of 1481.

Beneath the cycles of The Life of Moses and The Life of Christ, the lower level of the walls is decorated with frescoed hangings in silver and gold. Above the narrative frescos, the upper tier is divided into two zones. At the lower level of the windows is a Gallery of Popes painted at the same time as the Lives. Around the arched tops of the windows are areas known as the lunettes which contain the Ancestors of Christ, painted by Michelangelo as part of the scheme for the ceiling.

The ceiling was commissioned by Pope Julius II and painted by Michelangelo between 1508 and 1512. The commission was originally to paint the twelve apostles on the triangular spandrels which support the vault; however, Michelangelo demanded a free hand in the pictorial content of the scheme. He painted a series of nine pictures showing God's Creation of the World, God's Relationship with Mankind, and Mankind's Fall from God's Grace. On the four large "pendentives" at each corner of the ceiling he painted twelve Biblical and Classical men and women who prophesied that God would send Jesus Christ for the salvation of mankind, and around the upper parts of the windows, the Ancestors of Christ.

In 1515, Raphael was commissioned by Pope Leo X to design a series of ten tapestries to hang around the lower tier of the walls. The tapestries depict events from the Life of St. Peter [four tapestries] the Life of St. Paul [six tapestries], the founders of the Christian Church in Rome. Work began in mid-1515. Due to their large size, manufacture of the hangings was carried out in Brussels, and took four years under the hands of the weavers in the shop of Pieter van Aelst. Raphael's tapestries were looted during the Sack of Rome in 1527 and were either burnt for their precious metal content or were scattered around Europe. In the late 20th century, a set was reassembled from several further sets that had been made after the first set, and displayed again in the Sistine Chapel in 1983. The tapestries continue to be used at occasional ceremonies of particular importance. The full-size preparatory cartoons for seven of the 10 tapestries are known as the Raphael Cartoons and are in London.

At this point, the decorative scheme displayed a consistent iconographical pattern. The tier of Popes, which, in the scheme intended by Pope Julius, would have appeared immediately below the Twelve Apostles, would have emphasised the apostolic succession. It has been argued that the present scheme shows the two Biblical Testaments merged in order to reveal the Old predicting and framing the New, synthesizing the logic of the Christian Bible.

This was disrupted by a further commission to Michelangelo to decorate the wall above the altar with The Last Judgment, 1537–1541. The painting of this scene necessitated the obliteration of two episodes from the Lives—the Nativity of Jesus and the Finding of Moses; several of the Popes; and two sets of Ancestors.

== Frescoes ==
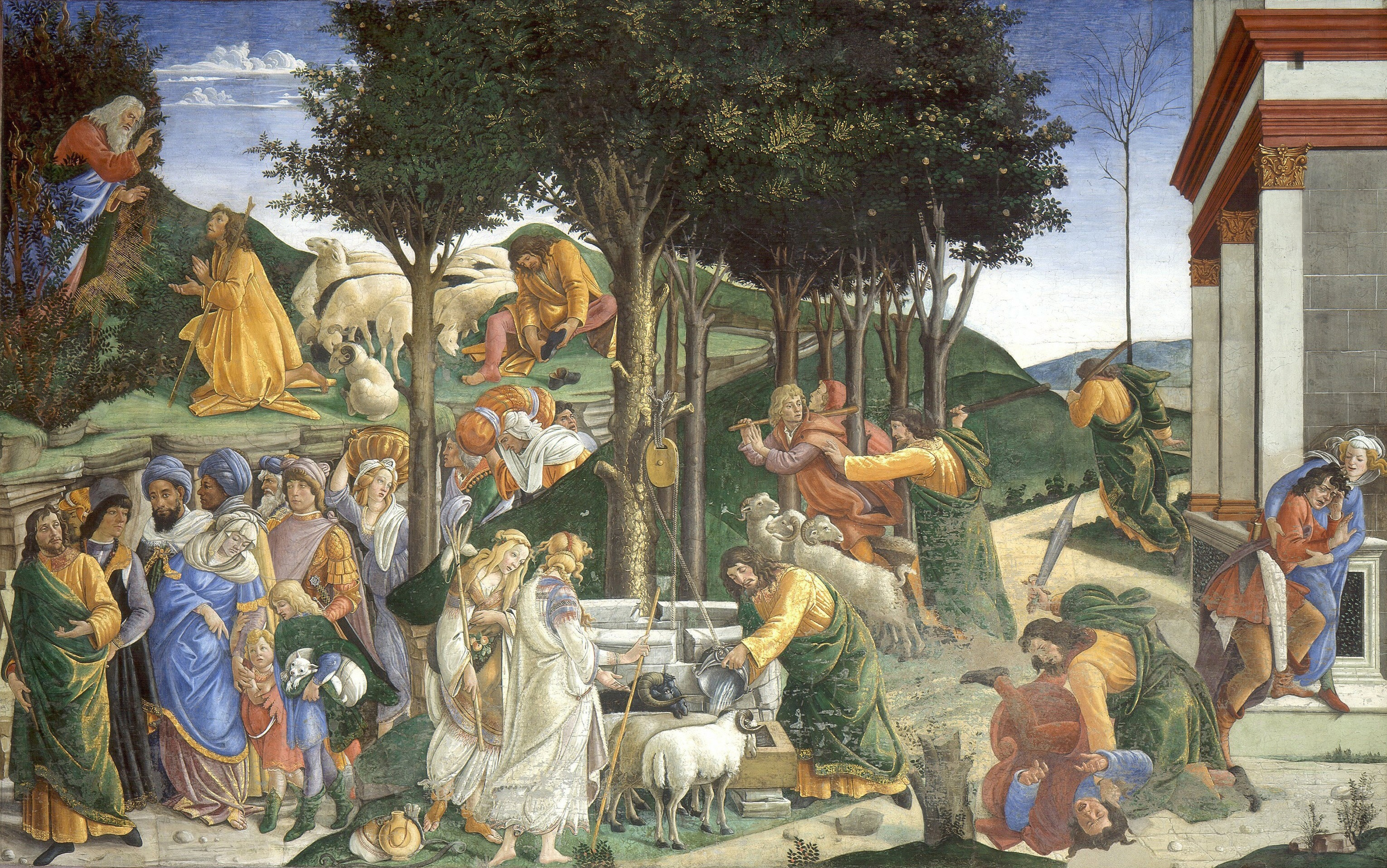
Trials of Moses by Botticelli

=== Southern wall ===
The southern wall is decorated with the Stories of Moses, painted in 1481–1482. Starting from the altar, they include:

- Moses Leaving for Egypt by Pietro Perugino and assistants
- The Trials of Moses by Sandro Botticelli and his workshop
- The Crossing of the Red Sea by Cosimo Rosselli, Domenico Ghirlandaio or Biagio di Antonio Tucci
- Descent from Mount Sinai by Cosimo Rosselli or Piero di Cosimo
- Punishment of the Rebels by Sandro Botticelli
- Testament and Death of Moses by Luca Signorelli or Bartolomeo della Gatta
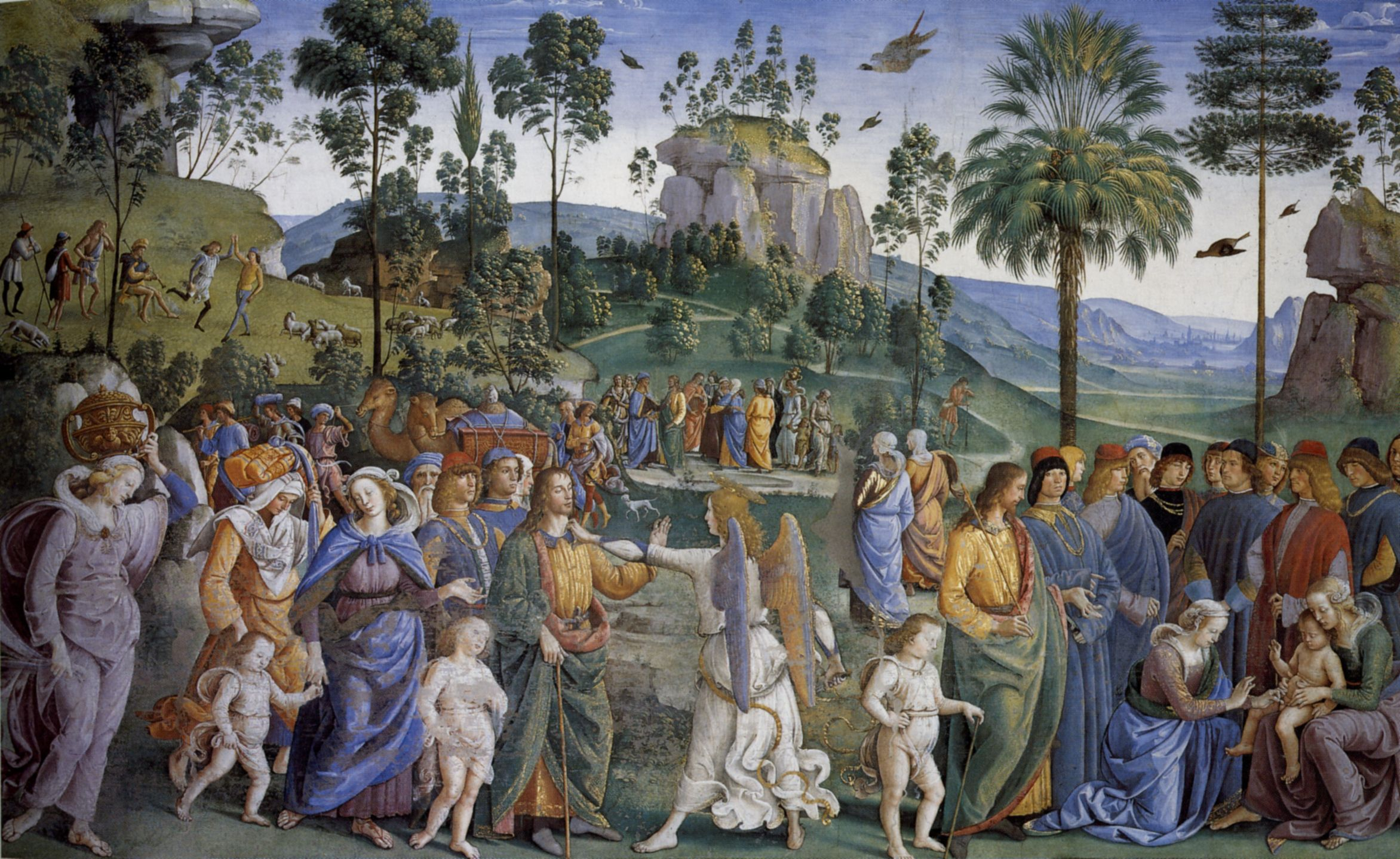
Moses Leaving for Egypt

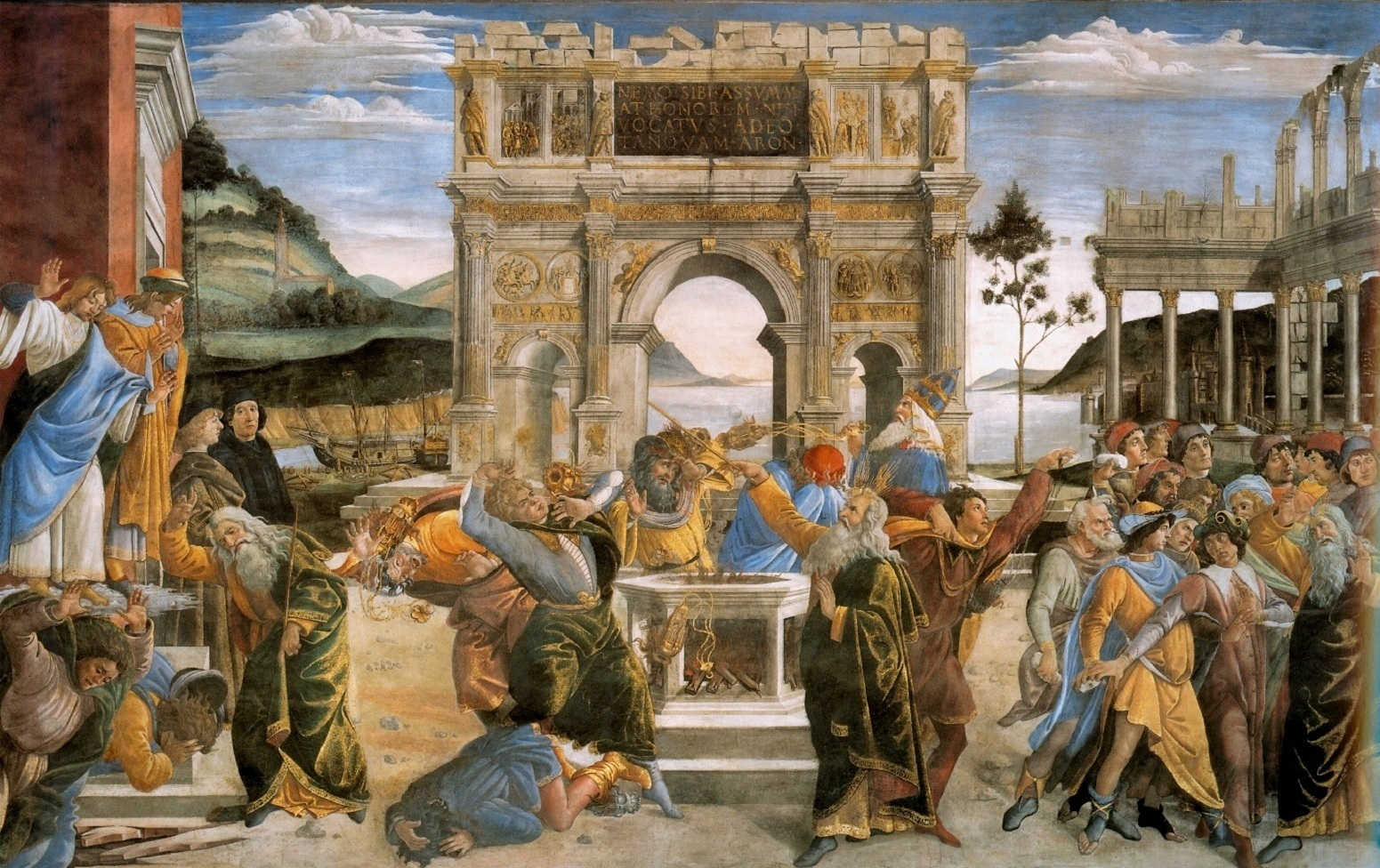
Punishment of the Rebels

=== Northern wall ===
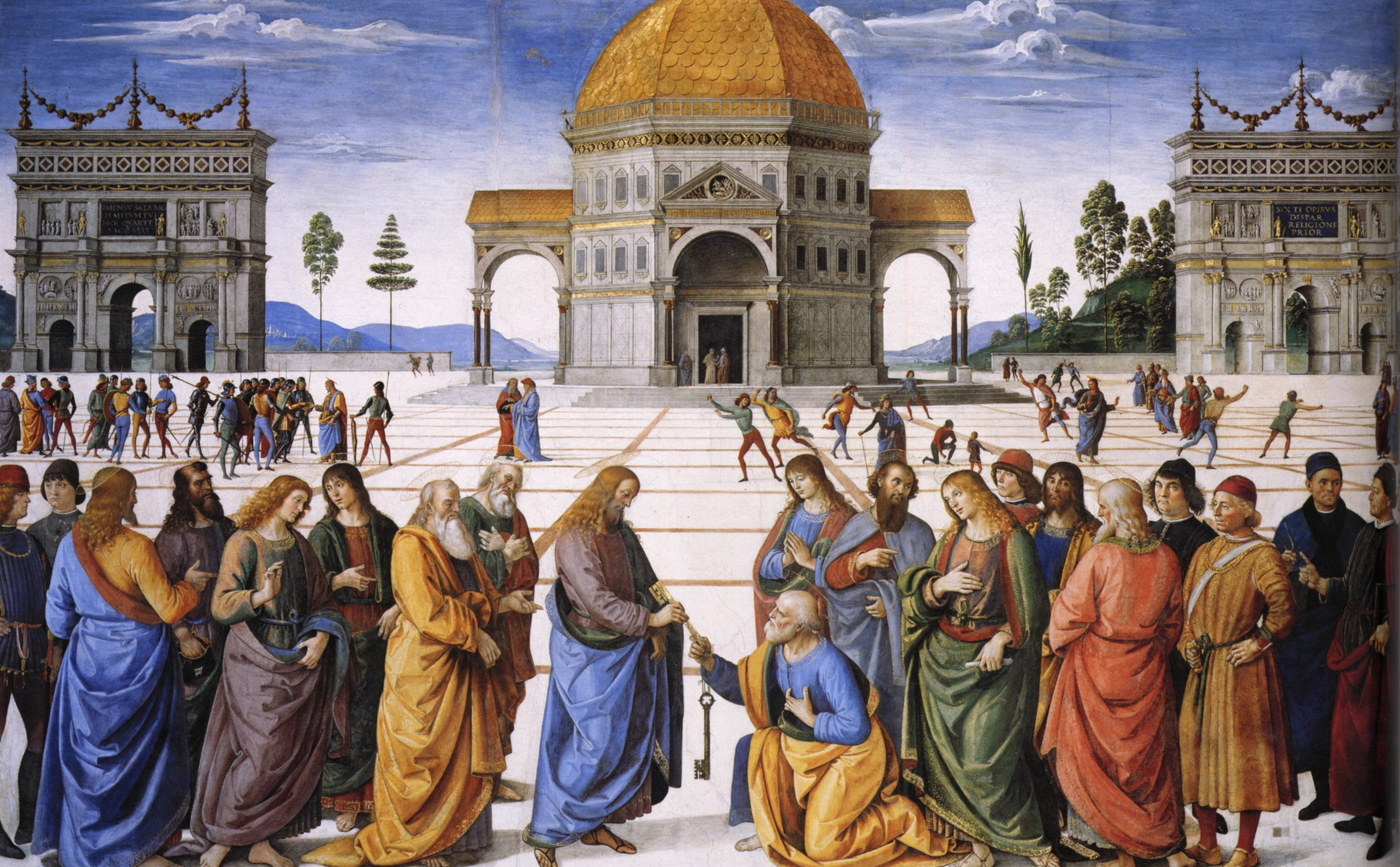
Delivery of the Keys by Perugino

The northern wall houses the Stories of Jesus, dating to 1481–1482. They include:

- Baptism of Christ by Pietro Perugino and assistants
- Temptations of Christ by Sandro Botticelli
- Vocation of the Apostles by Domenico Ghirlandaio
- The Sermon on the Mount, attributed to Cosimo Rosselli
- The Delivery of the Keys by Pietro Perugino
- The Last Supper by Cosimo Rosselli

=== Eastern wall ===
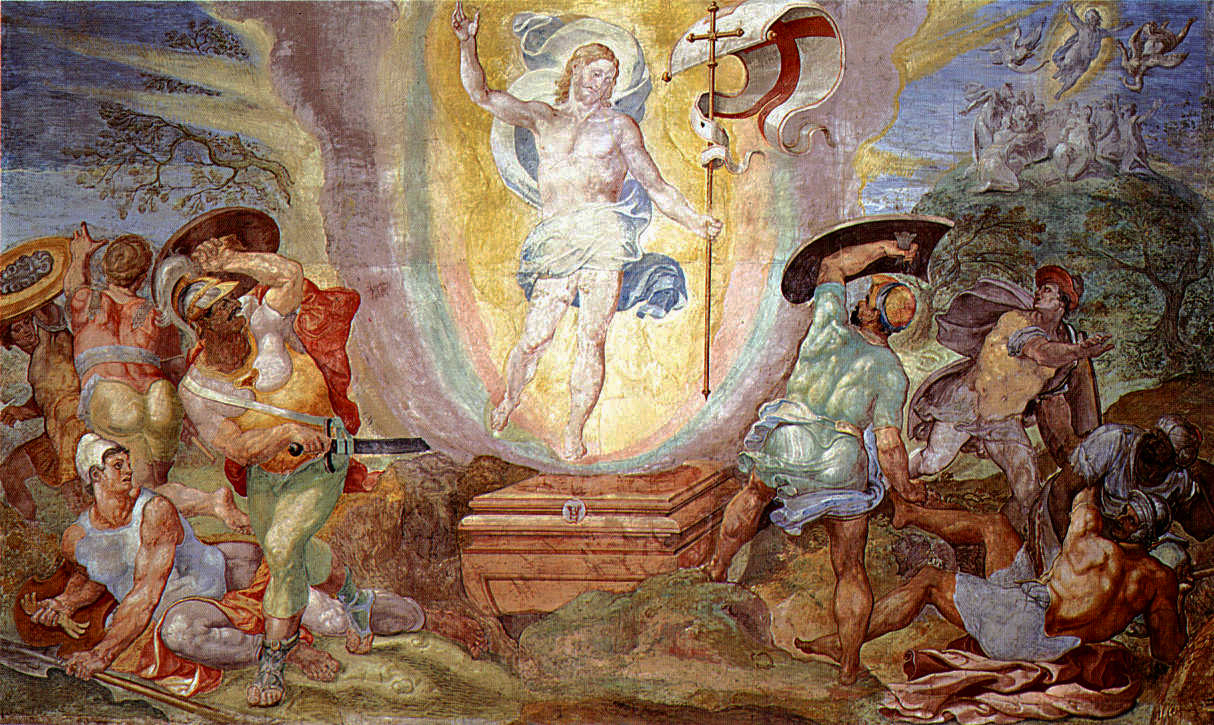
Resurrection of Christ

- Resurrection of Christ by Hendrick van den Broeck (1572) over Domenico Ghirlandaio's original
- Disputation over Moses' Body by Matteo da Lecce (1574) over Luca Signorelli's original

=== Michelangelo's frescoes ===
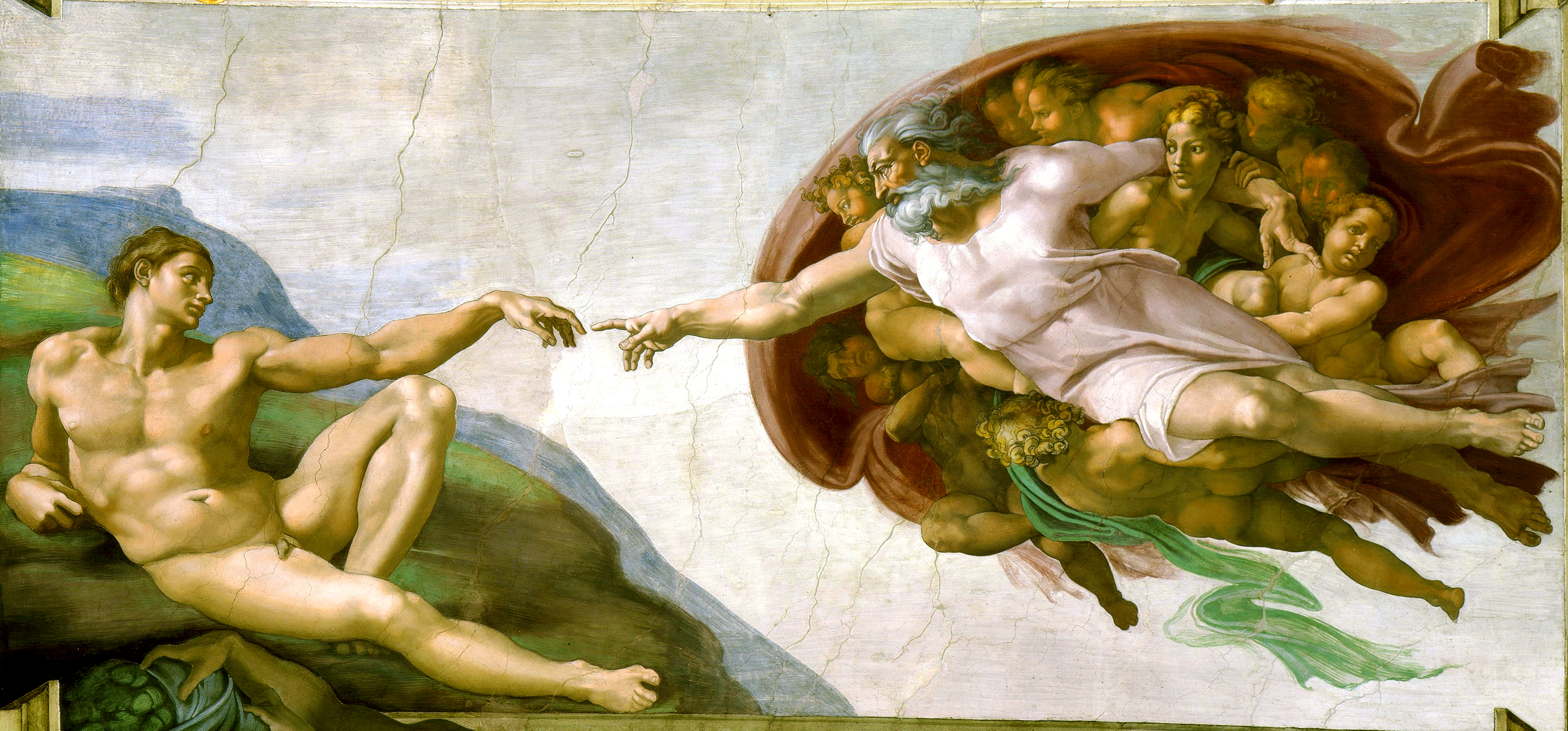
The Creation of Adam by Michelangelo

Michelangelo was commissioned by Pope Julius II in 1508 to repaint the vault, or ceiling, of the chapel. The work was completed between 1508 and late 1512. He painted the Last Judgment over the altar, between 1535 and 1541, on commission from Pope Paul III Farnese.

Michelangelo was intimidated by the scale of the commission, and made it known from the outset of Julius II's approach that he would prefer to decline. He felt he was more of a sculptor than a painter, and was suspicious that such a large-scale project was being offered to him by enemies as a set-up for an inevitable fall. For Michelangelo, the project was a distraction from the major marble sculpture that had preoccupied him for the previous few years. The sources of Michelangelo's inspiration are not easily determined; both Joachite and Augustinian theologians were within the sphere of Julius' influence.

==== Ceiling ====
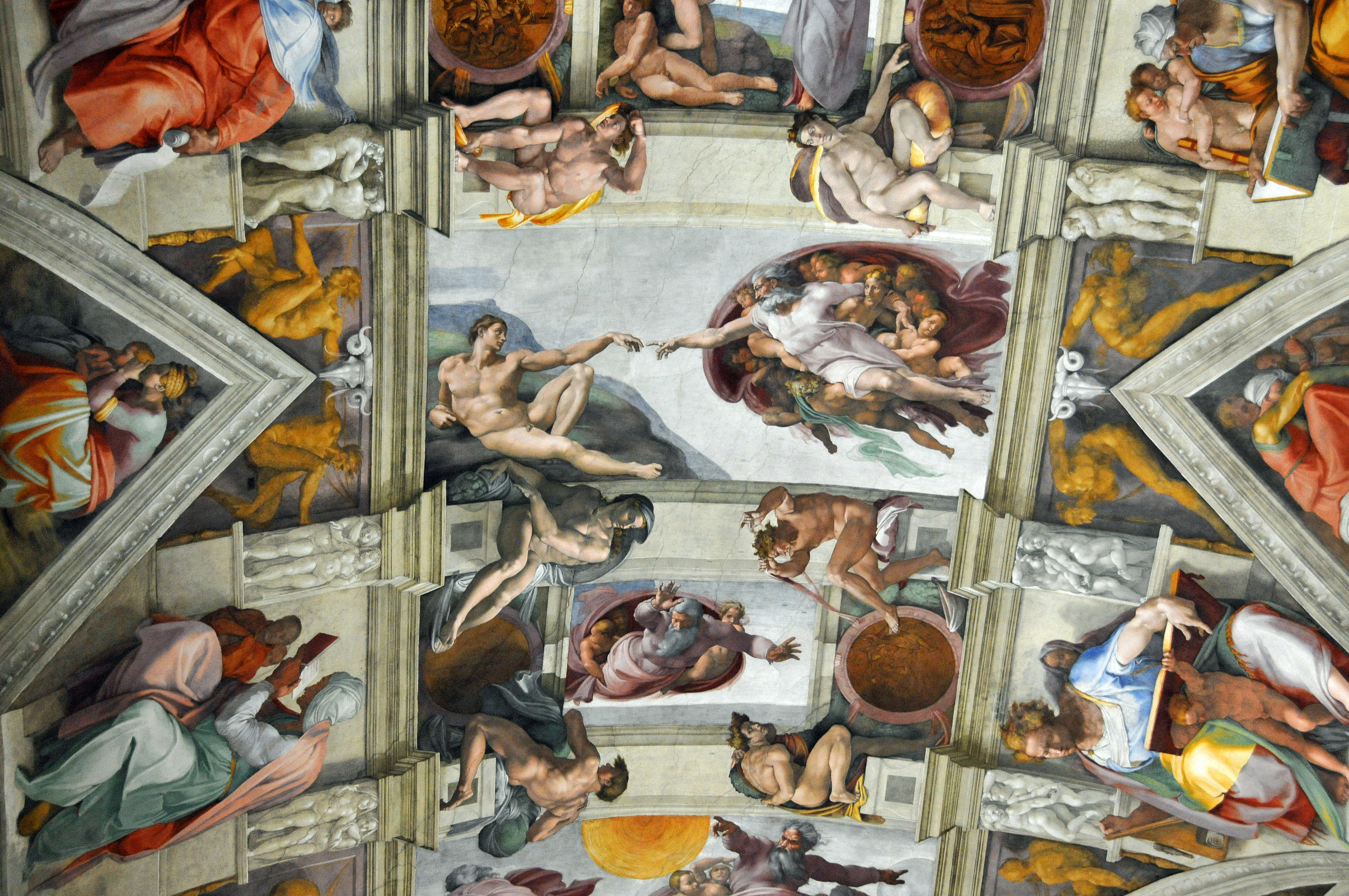
A section of the Sistine Chapel ceiling.

To be able to reach the ceiling, Michelangelo needed a support; the first idea was by Julius' favoured architect Donato Bramante, who wanted to build for him a scaffold to be suspended in the air with ropes. However, Bramante did not successfully complete the task, and the structure he built was flawed. He had perforated the vault in order to lower strings to secure the scaffold. Michelangelo laughed when he saw the structure, and believed it would leave holes in the ceiling once the work was ended. He asked Bramante what was to happen when the painter reached the perforations, but the architect had no answer.

The matter was taken before the Pope, who ordered Michelangelo to build a scaffold of his own. Michelangelo created a flat wooden platform on brackets built out from holes in the wall, high up near the top of the windows. Contrary to popular belief, he did not lie on this scaffolding while he painted, but painted from a standing position.

Michelangelo used bright colours, easily visible from the floor. On the lowest part of the ceiling he painted the ancestors of Christ. Above this he alternated male and female prophets, with Jonah over the altar. On the highest section, Michelangelo painted nine stories from the Book of Genesis. He was originally commissioned to paint only twelve figures, the Apostles. He turned down the commission because he saw himself as a sculptor, not a painter. The Pope offered to allow Michelangelo to paint biblical scenes of his own choice as a compromise. After the work was finished, there were more than three hundred figures. His figures showed the creation, Adam and Eve in the Garden of Eden, and the Great Flood.

The painted area is about 40 m (131 ft) long by 13 m (43 ft) wide. This means that Michelangelo painted well over 5,000 square feet (460 m^{2}) of frescoes.

==== The Last Judgement ====
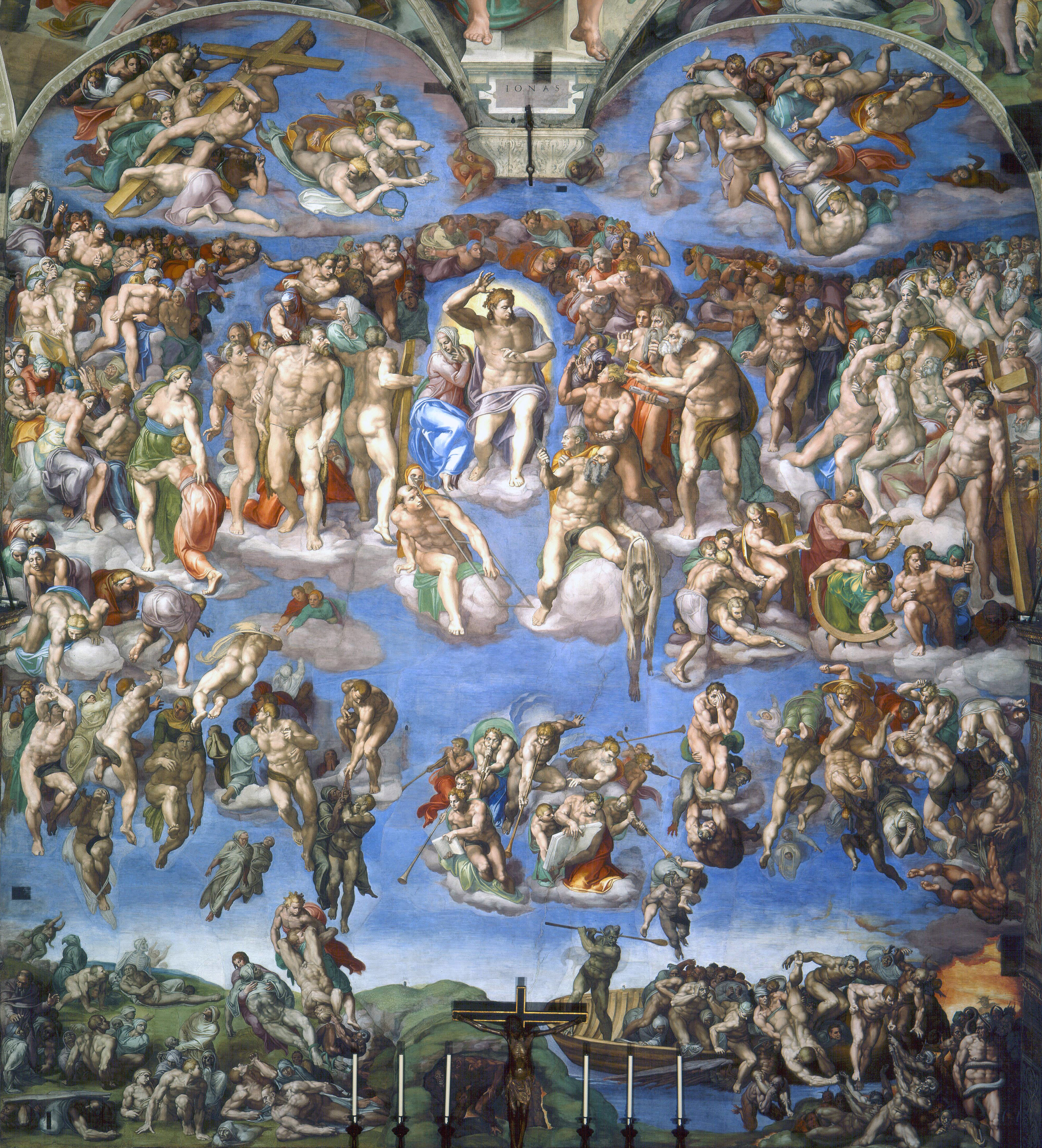
The Last Judgement as it exists today

The Last Judgement was painted by Michelangelo from 1535 to 1541, between two important historic events: the Sack of Rome by mercenary forces of the Holy Roman Empire in 1527, and the Council of Trent which commenced in 1545. The work was designed on a grand scale, and spans the entire wall behind the altar of the Sistine Chapel. The painting depicts the second coming of Christ on the Day of Judgment as described in the Revelation of John, Chapter 20. High on the wall is the heroic figure of Christ, with the saints clustered in groups around him. At the bottom left of the painting the dead are raised from their graves and ascend to be judged. To the right are those who are assigned to Hell and are dragged down by demons.

The Last Judgement was an object of a bitter dispute between Cardinal Carafa and Michelangelo. Because he depicted naked figures, the artist was accused of immorality and obscenity. A censorship campaign (known as the "Fig-Leaf Campaign") was organized by Carafa and Monsignor Sernini (Mantua's ambassador) to remove the frescoes. From this campaign drew support for the more natural state of the figures. In response, phallic imagery began permeating throughout Vatican City, beginning the trend of the crude drawings in places such as in graffiti art in bathrooms, textbooks, and other public places to be easily found. This trend continues to the present day.

The Pope's Master of Ceremonies Biagio da Cesena said "it was most disgraceful that in so sacred a place there should have been depicted all those nude figures, exposing themselves so shamefully, and that it was no work for a papal chapel but rather for the public baths and taverns." In response Michelangelo worked da Cesena's semblance into the scene as Minos, judge of the underworld. It is said that when he complained to the Pope, the pontiff responded that his jurisdiction did not extend to hell, so the portrait would have to remain. Michelangelo also painted his own portrait, on the flayed skin held by St. Bartholomew.

The genitalia in the fresco were later covered by the artist Daniele da Volterra, whom history remembers by the derogatory nickname "Il Braghettone" ("the breeches-painter").

== Restoration and controversy ==
The Sistine Chapel's ceiling restoration began on 7 November 1984. When the restoration was completed, the chapel was re-opened to the public on 8 April 1994. The part of the restoration in the Sistine Chapel that has caused the most concern is the ceiling, painted by Michelangelo. The emergence of the brightly coloured Ancestors of Christ from the gloom sparked a reaction of fear that the processes being employed in the cleaning were too severe and removed the original intent of the artist.

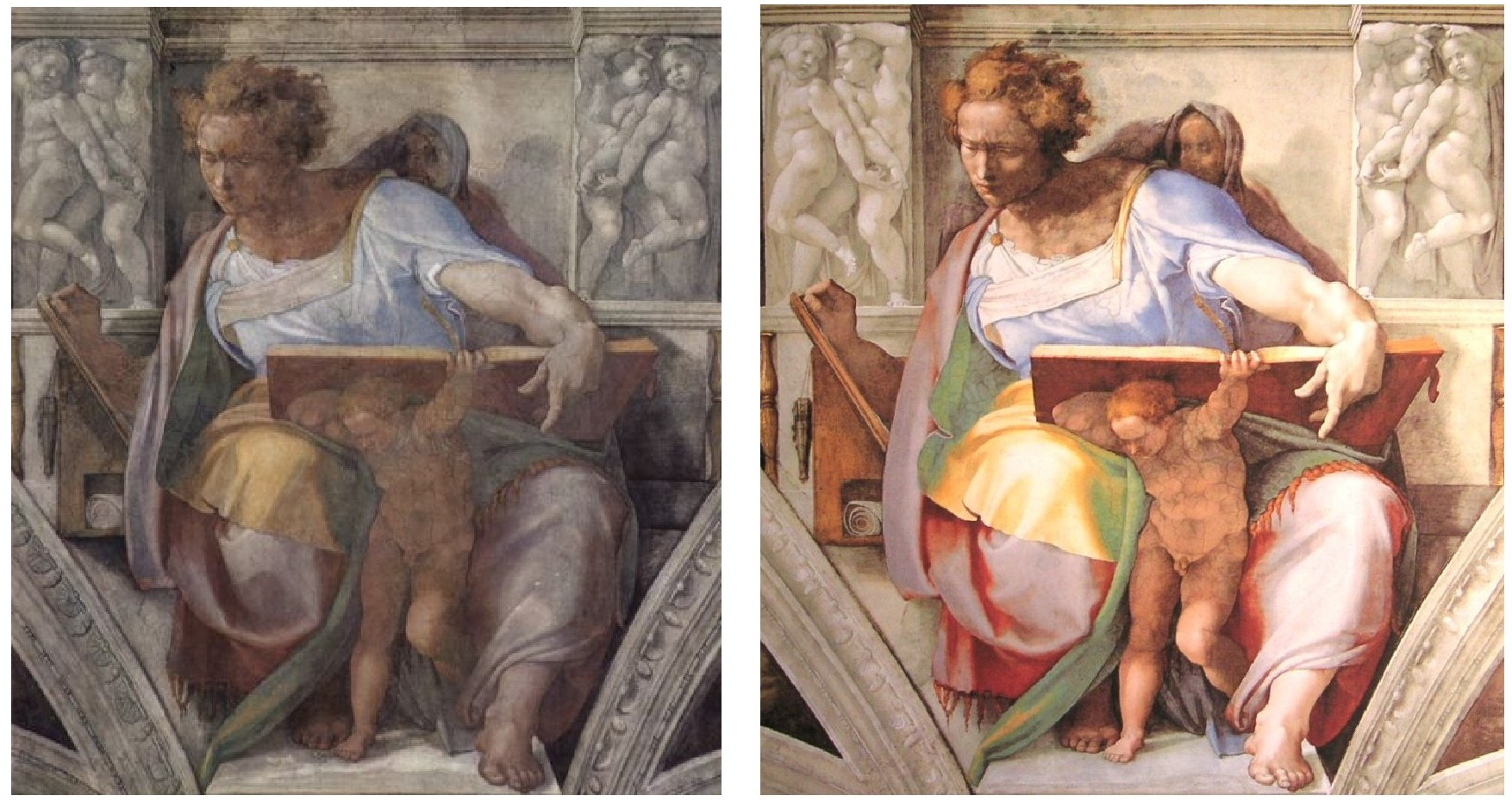
Daniel, before and after the restoration

The problem lies in the analysis and understanding of the techniques utilised by Michelangelo, and the technical response of the restorers to that understanding. A close examination of the frescoes of the lunettes convinced the restorers that Michelangelo worked exclusively in buon fresco; that is, the artist worked only on freshly laid plaster and each section of work was completed while the plaster was still in its fresh state. In other words, they believed Michelangelo did not work "a secco"; he did not come back later and add details onto the dry plaster.

The restorers, by assuming that the artist took a universal approach to the painting, took a universal approach to the restoration. A decision was made that all of the shadowy layer of animal glue and "lamp black", all of the wax, and all of the overpainted areas were contamination of one sort or another: smoke deposits, earlier restoration attempts, and painted definition by later restorers in an attempt to enliven the appearance of the work. Based on this decision, according to Arguimbau's critical reading of the restoration data that have been provided, the chemists of the restoration team decided upon a solvent that would effectively strip the ceiling down to its paint-impregnated plaster. After treatment, only that which was painted buon fresco would remain.

== Replicas ==
The only reproduction of the Sistine Chapel ceiling was painted by Gary Bevans at English Martyrs' Catholic Church in Goring-by-Sea, Worthing, West Sussex, England. A full-size architectural and photographic replica of the entire building was commissioned by the Mexican government and funded by private donors. It was on view at Mexico City from 1 June to 15 July 2016. It took 2.6 million high definition photographs to reproduce the totality of the frescoes and tapestries. A video of the history of the chapel was shown to visitors before entering the building; inside, a light-and-sound demonstration explained the content of each of the frescoes.

== Quotes on Michelangelo's frescoes in the Sistine Chapel ==
Without having seen the Sistine Chapel one can form no appreciable idea of what one man is capable of achieving.

— Johann Wolfgang Goethe, 23 August 1787,

This work has been and truly is a beacon of our art, and it has brought such benefit and enlightenment to the art of painting that it was sufficient to illuminate a world which for so many hundreds of years had remained in the state of darkness. And, to tell the truth, anyone who is a painter no longer needs to concern himself about seeing innovations and inventions, new ways of painting poses, clothing on figures, and various awe-inspiring details, for Michelangelo gave to this work all the perfection that can be given to such details.

— Giorgio Vasari on Michelangelo's frescoes in the Sistine Chapel

== Music ==
Since the chapel's inception, the Sistine Chapel Choir has sung without the accompaniment of musical instruments as instruments were not permitted to be played inside the chapel. This was problematic as there was no way of giving the musical starting pitch to the choir. Instead of allowing an instrument to give the starting pitch, the solution was to allow the individual singing first to choose the starting pitch. This instruction was given after an apostolic visitation of the choir in 1630:

"Quando si ha da cominciare a cantare ciascuno lasci cominciare il più vecchio, quale se non intonata bene dovere essere puntato con rigore."

On 19 February 2014, Canadian violinist Rosemary Siemens became the first solo instrumentalist to perform at the Sistine Chapel. The historic performance was for an event entitled Spiritual Elevation as part of the Fondazione Pro Musical e Arte Sacra where Siemens was a featured guest soloist alongside vocalist Mary Zilba and harpist Mark Edward Spencer. Siemens, Zilba, and Spencer performed a medley that included the hymns "Amazing Grace" and "Be Thou My Vision". The historic performance took place in concert with the Continuo Arts Symphonic Chorus, led by conductor Candace Wicke. Siemens also joined the Continuo Arts Symphonic Chorus for a Requiem entitled "Requiem For My Mother", composed by Stephen Edwards.

On 29 April 2016, The Edge (U2) became the first rock artist to stage a contemporary music concert at the chapel as part of a conference on regenerative medicines entitled Cellular Horizons. The Edge performed "Walk On", "Yahweh", "Ordinary Love", by U2 as well as a Leonard Cohen cover of "If It Be Your Will" backed by an Irish choir.

In 2017, Cecilia Bartoli became the first woman to perform alongside the all-male Sistine Chapel Choir. Bartoli performed Beata Viscera by medieval composer Pérotin.

The first live-streamed concert at the chapel took place on 22 April 2018, featuring a performance of Scottish composer James MacMillian's version of the Stabat Mater by the British choir group The Sixteen and chamber orchestra ensemble Britten Sinfonia. The concert was attended live by over three hundred people and streamed live over the website of Classic FM.

== See also ==
- Art patronage of Julius II
- Index of Vatican City-related articles
- Santa Maria Maggiore
- The Agony and the Ecstasy, 1965 film
- List of tourist attractions in Rome
