= The Crossing of the Red Sea (Sistine Chapel) =

Fresco by Biagio d'Antonio

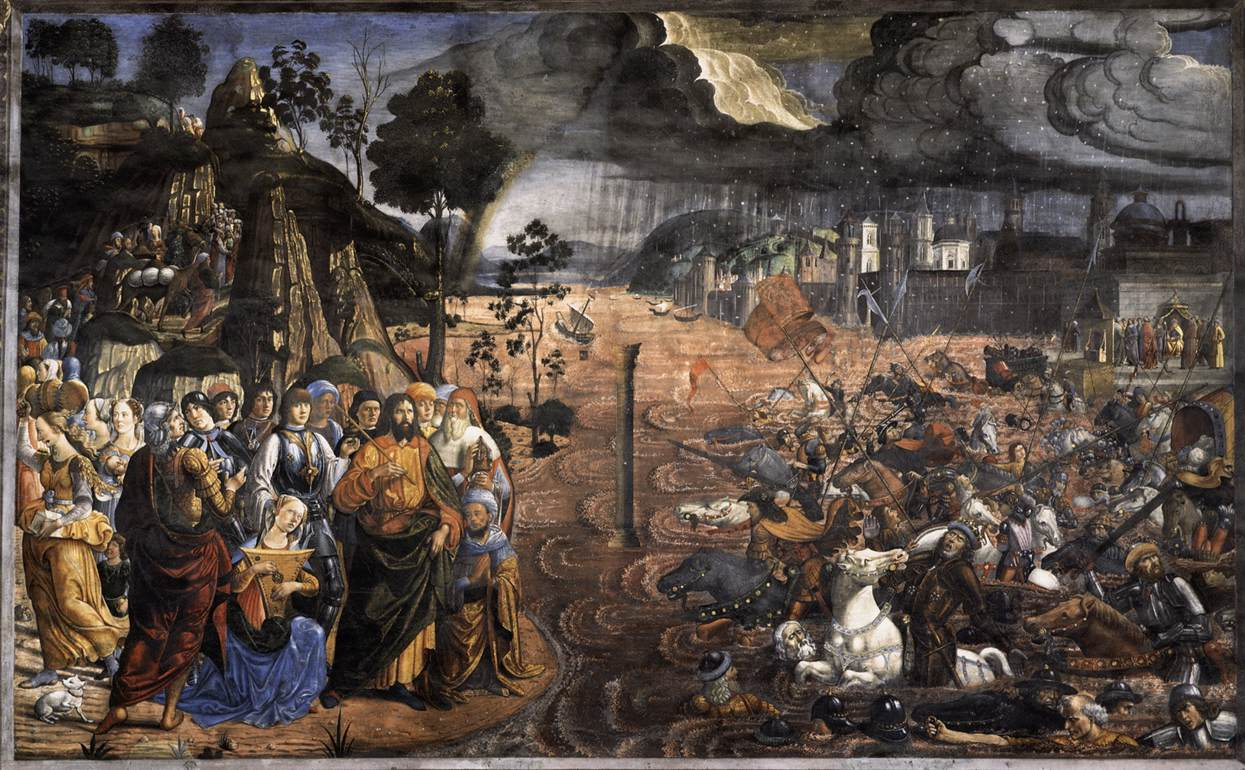
- Artist: Cosimo Rosselli
- Year: 1481–1482
- Type: Fresco
- Dimensions: 350 cm × 572 cm (140 in × 225 in)
- Location: Sistine Chapel; Vatican City

The Crossing of the Red Sea is a fresco executed in 1481–1482 and located in the Sistine Chapel, Vatican City. Of uncertain attribution, it has been assigned to Cosimo Rosselli. It depicts the crossing of the Red Sea by the Israelites, from chapter 14 of the book of Exodus.

== History ==
On 27 October 1480 several Florentine painters left for Rome, where they had been called as part of the reconciliation project between Lorenzo de' Medici, the de facto ruler of Florence, and Pope Sixtus IV. The Florentines started to work in the Sistine Chapel as early as the Spring of 1481, along with Pietro Perugino, who was already there.

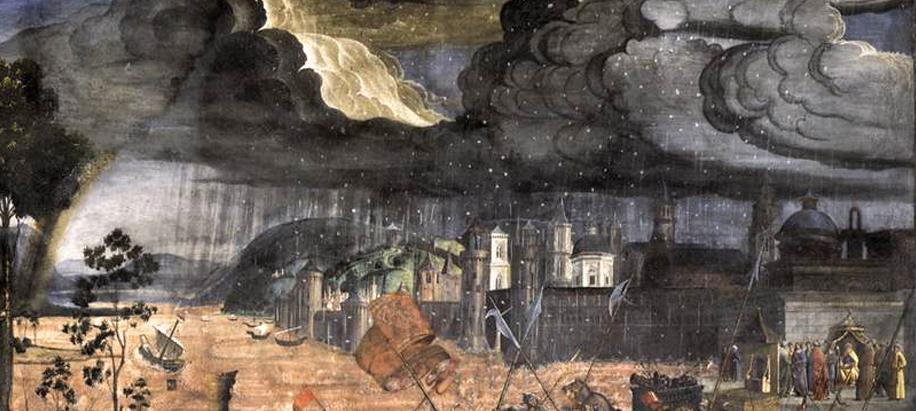
Detail of the storm.

The theme of the decoration was a parallel between the Stories of Moses and those of Christ, as a sign of continuity between the Old and the New Testament. A continuity also between the divine law of the Tables and the message of Jesus, who, in turn, chose Peter (the first alleged bishop of Rome) as his successor: this would finally result in a legitimation of the latter's successors, the popes of Rome.

Among the several fresco in the cycle, that of the Passage of the Red Sea was the one with the most problematic attribution. Although the name of Ghirlandaio was made by several authorities, the work's style is more reminiscent of that of Cosimo Rosselli or Biagio d'Antonio.

== Description ==
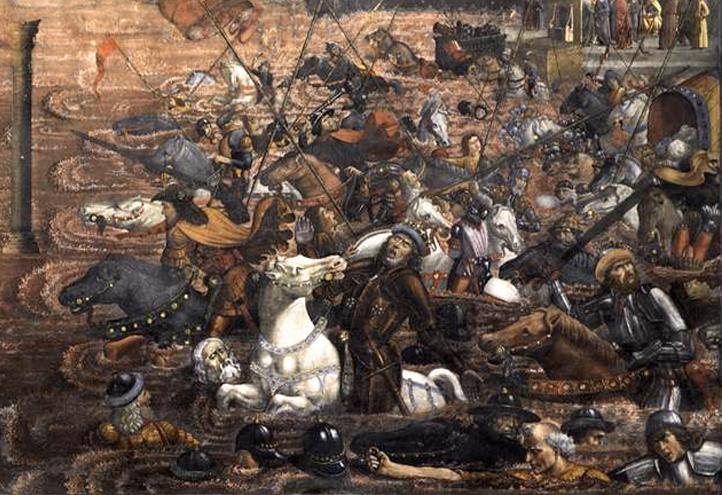
Detail.

The scene is part of the chapel's Stories of Moses cycle, and, like other frescoes there, shows several scenes at the same time. The sequence begins from the right background, where Moses and Aaron are begging the Pharaoh to free the Israelites. On the right are the Egyptian soldiers, shown in typical Italian Renaissance military garments, armor and weapons, who are drowning after the Red Sea waters close around them. The waters had miraculously opened to allow the Israelites to cross them. The Pharaoh is portrayed in a frantic scream, while other figures try to return to the Egyptian shore by swimming. Before the army is a column hovering over the waters: this is a representation of the fire pillar sent by Yahweh to scare the Egyptians.

In the upper central area is a hail storm, sent by God to punish the Egyptians. Also depicted are some sunrays and, more to the left, a rainbow, symbols of the upcoming liberation for the Israelite people. Similar representation of meteorological phenomena were not uncommon in the 15th-century Italian art: other examples are Fra Angelico's Martyrdom of St. Mark on the Tabernacle of the Linaioli, and several Paolo Uccello's St. George and the Drake.

On the left are the Israelites, led by a young Moses with the typical yellow garment and green cloak, and a command baton, after they have just crossed the sea. Their safeness is testified by the presence of recreational activities, such as the prophetess Miriam playing a chordophone in the foreground. They continue their trip in procession, disappearing on the left, in a naturalistic landscape. Details include a pet dog in the foreground, reminiscent of Benozzo Gozzoli's paintings in the Magi Chapel.

== Sources ==
- Blumenthal, Arthur R. (2001). Cosimo Rosselli Painter of the Sistine Chapel. Winter Park: Cornell Fine Arts Museum.
