= Descent from Mount Sinai (Sistine Chapel) =

Fresco by Cosimo Rosselli

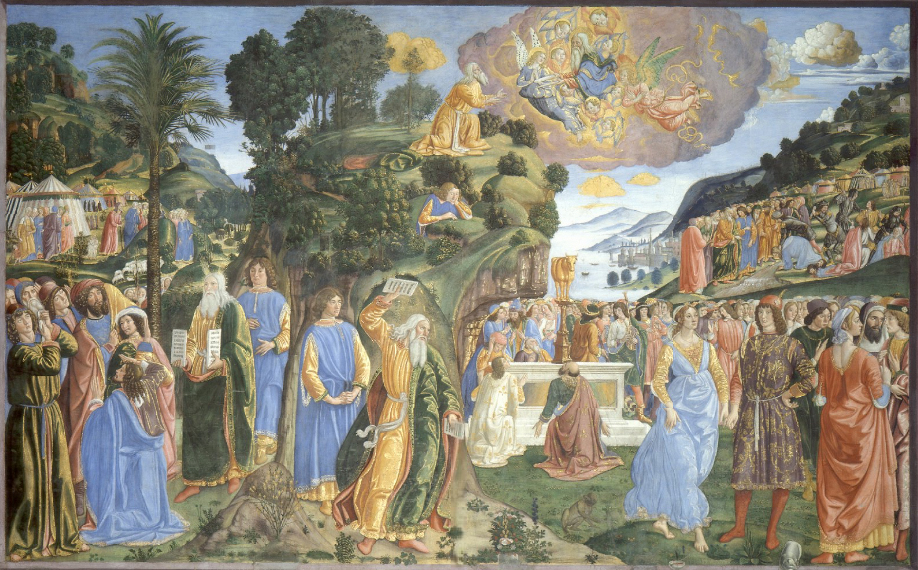
- Artist: Cosimo Rosselli and workshop
- Year: 1481–1482
- Type: Fresco
- Dimensions: 350 cm × 572 cm (140 in × 225 in)
- Location: Sistine Chapel; Rome

The Descent from Mount Sinai is a fresco by the Italian Renaissance painter Cosimo Rosselli and his assistants, executed in 1481–1482 and located in the Sistine Chapel, Rome. It depicts the prophet Moses in the process of receiving and introducing the Ten Commandments.

== History ==
On 27 October 1480, several Florentine painters left for Rome, where they had been called as part of the reconciliation project between Lorenzo de' Medici, the de facto ruler of Florence, and Pope Sixtus IV. The Florentines started to work in the Sistine Chapel as early as spring 1481, along with Pietro Perugino, who was already there. Rosselli brought with him his son-in-law, Piero di Cosimo, who perhaps collaborated on this painting and at least one of the others assigned by his master.

The theme of the decoration was a parallel between the stories of Moses and those of Christ, as a sign of continuity between the Old Testament and the New Testament, as well as a continuity between the divine law of the Tables and the message of Jesus, who, in turn, chose Peter (the first alleged bishop of Rome) as his successor: this would finally result in a legitimation of the latter's successors, the popes of Rome.

== Description ==
The painting, like others in the cycle, shows more episodes at the same time; the theme is described by the inscription on the frieze PROMULGATIO LEGIS SCRIPTE PER MOISEM. In ("Promulgation of the Written Law through Moses").

In the upper part is Moses kneeling on Mount Sinai, with a sleeping Joshua nearby: he receives the Tables of the Law from Yahweh, who appears in a luminescent cloud, surrounded by angels. In the foreground, on the left, Moses brings the Tables to the Israelites. In the background is camp of tents, with the altar of the golden calf in the middle; the Israelites, spurred by Aaron, are adoring it: the position of some of them, painted from behind, was usually used for negative characters, such as Judas Iscariot in the Last Supper. Once seeing that, Moses, in the center, gets angry and breaks the Tables on the ground. The right background depicts the punishment of the idolatrous and the receiving of the new Tables. Joshua, in the blue and yellow, appears with Moses.

== Sources ==
- Blumenthal, Arthur R. (2001). Cosimo Rosselli Painter of the Sistine Chapel. Winter Park: Cornell Fine Arts Museum.
