= Cosimo Rosselli =

Italian painter

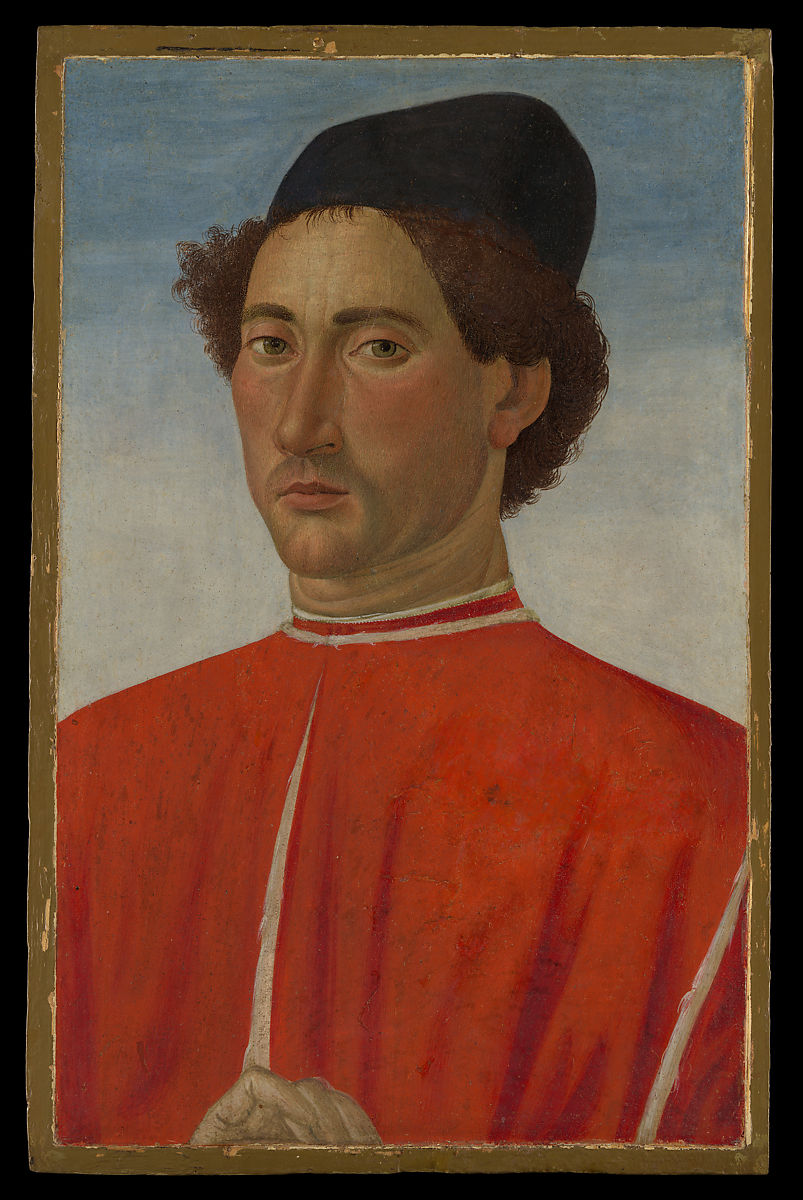
- Cosimo Rosselli, Portrait of a Man c. 1481–82
- Born: Cosimo Rosselli; 1439; Republic of Florence (present-day Tuscany, Italy)
- Died: c. 1507 (aged 68); Republic of Florence (present-day Tuscany, Italy)
- Known for: Painting
- Movement: High Renaissance

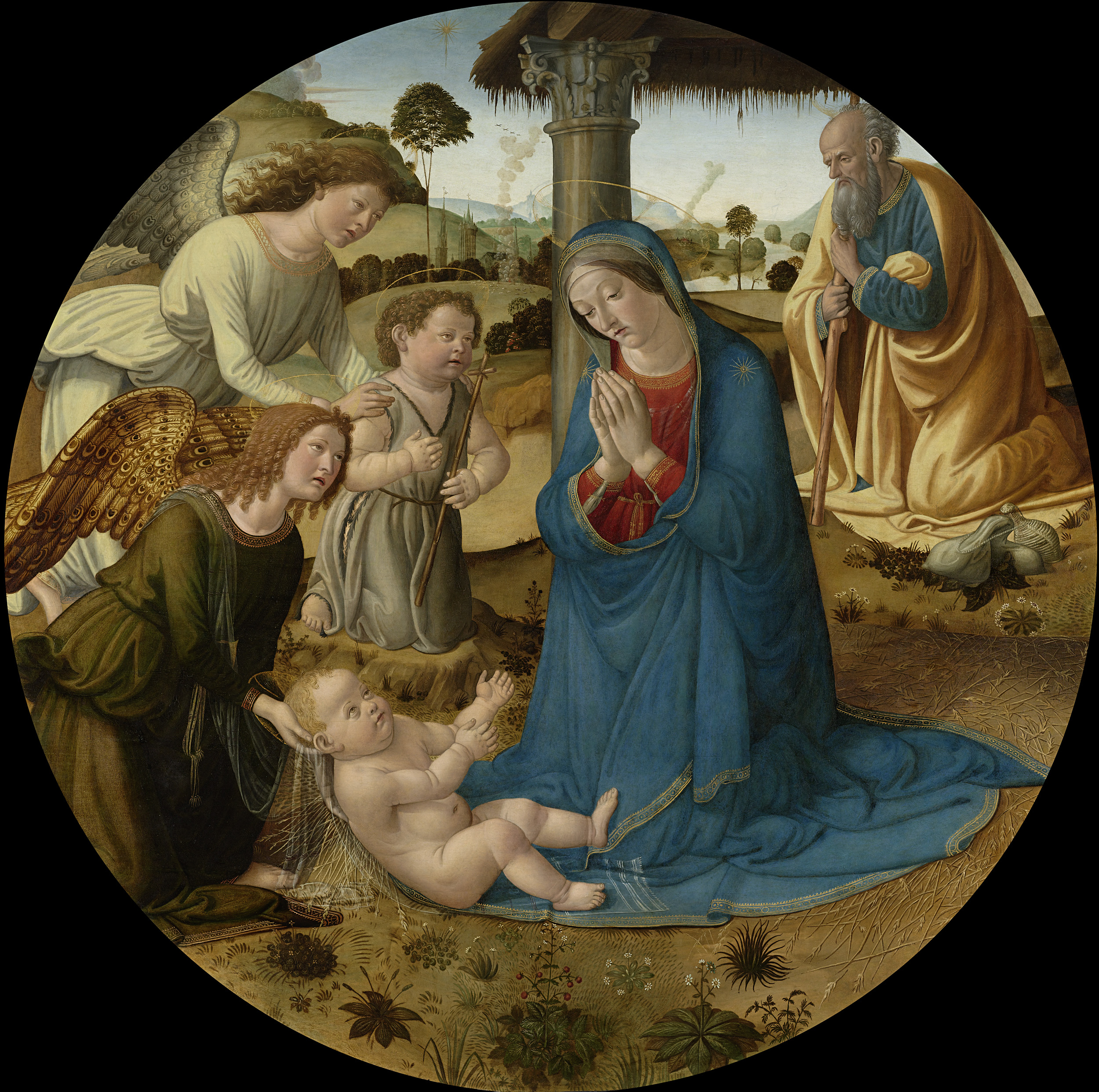
Nativity, 1490s. Amsterdam, Rijksmuseum.

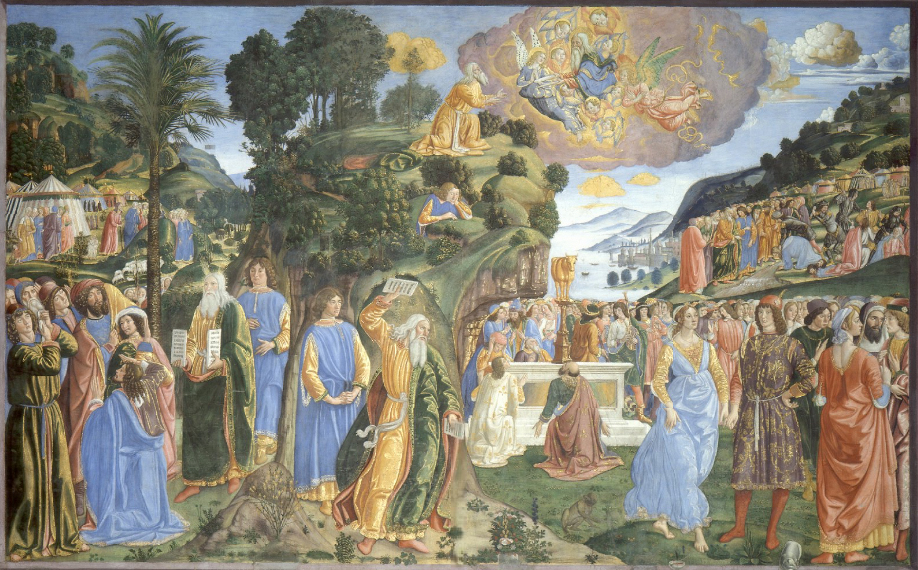
Handing over the Tablets of the Law, Sistine Chapel

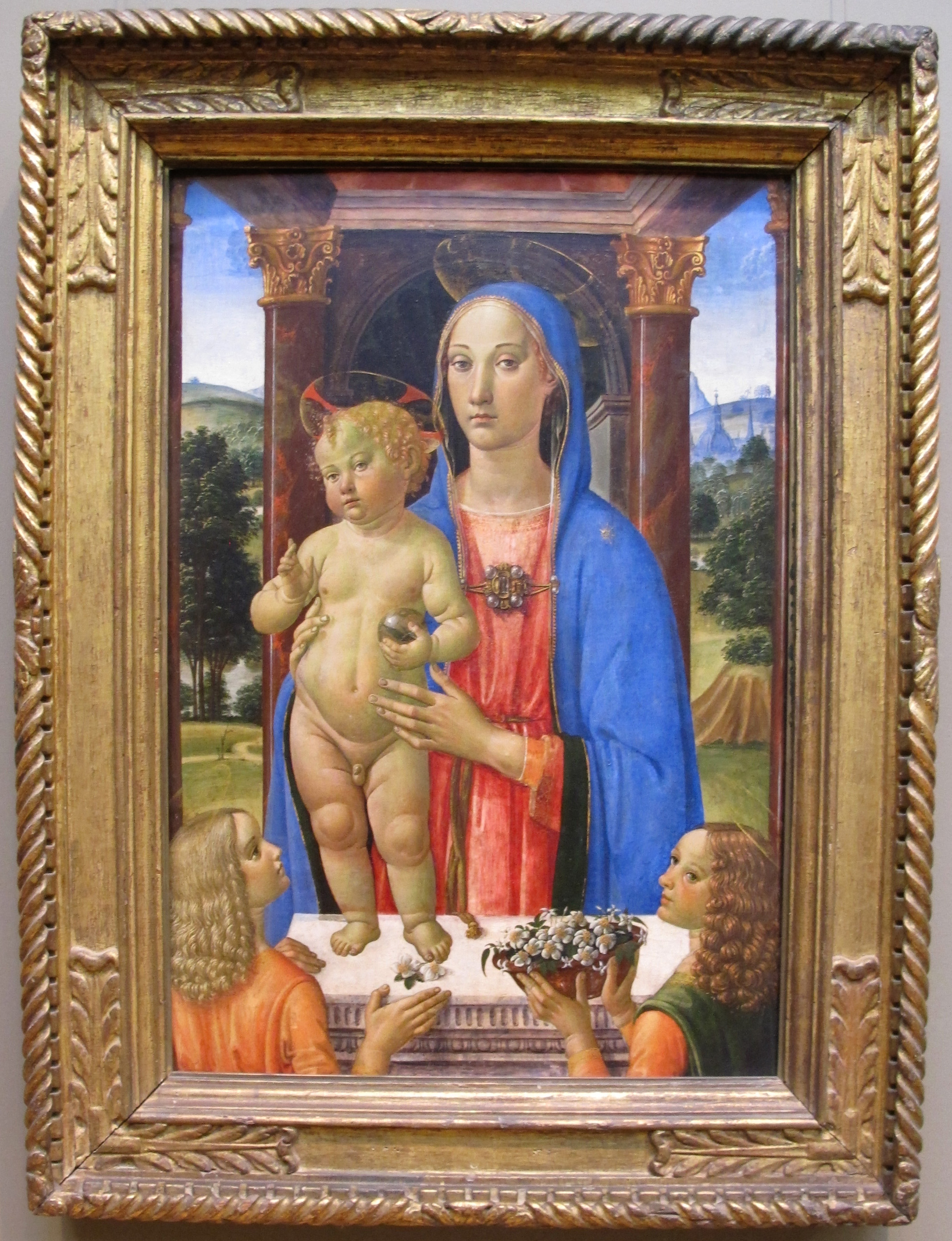
Madonna and Child with Angels, ca 1481. New York, Metropolitan Museum of Art.

Cosimo Rosselli (Italian: [ˈkɔːzimo rosˈsɛlli]; 1439–1507) was an Italian painter of the Quattrocento, active mainly in his birthplace of Florence, but also in Pisa earlier in his career and in 1481–82 in the Sistine Chapel in Rome, where he painted some of the large frescoes on the side walls.

Though generally regarded as a lesser talent in comparison to Sandro Botticelli, Pietro Perugino, and Domenico Ghirlandaio, who were all also active at the Sistine Chapel, Rosselli was still able to win large and important commissions throughout his career, a testament to his high level of activity in his native Florence. Important local commissions include a fresco in the cloister of Santissima Annunziata, Florence and those in the Chapel of the Holy Blood in Sant'Ambrogio, Florence.

== Biography ==
Cosimo Rosselli was born in Florence. In 1453, at the age of fourteen, he became a pupil of Neri di Bicci, who also trained Cosimo's cousin Bernardo di Stefano Rosselli. A relatively early work, completed in 1469, is the panel of Saints Barbara, Matthias and John the Baptist, painted for the chapel of the German confraternity in the church of the Santissima Annunziata, Florence. Rosselli also painted a fresco in the Annunziata's forecourt and a lunette of the Annunciation in the adjoining convent.

Rosselli was one of the painters called by Pope Sixtus IV to Rome in 1481 to fresco the sides walls of the Sistine Chapel, together with other masters including Sandro Botticelli, Pietro Perugino and Domenico Ghirlandaio. Rosselli and his collaborators, who are said to have included the young Piero di Cosimo, executed two or three frescoes: the Descent from Mount Sinai, the Last Supper, and the Sermon of the Mount. The Passage of the Red Sea was once attributed to him or Ghirlandaio but is actually by Biagio d'Antonio, who also assisted Rosselli on the Last Supper. Giorgio Vasari wrote in his Lives of the Most Excellent Painters, Sculptors, and Architects that, as opposed to the other painters who followed a common pattern in the size and style of the frescoes, Rosselli used brighter colors and a large amount of gold, which gained him the appreciation of the Pope (who, hints Vasari, was not a deep expert in art).

Giorgio Vasari mentioned other works by Rosselli, including the altarpiece of the Madonna and Child in Glory with Saints Augustine and Francis in the third chapel on the left of the nave of Sant'Ambrogio in Florence. In the same church is the Chapel of the Holy Blood with its frescoes by Rosselli, which Vasari praised highly, especially for a portrait of the young scholar Pico of Mirandola. The main scene in this chapel is a procession of the miracle-working chalice held in the very same church. Rosselli also spent some time in Lucca, where he painted several altar-pieces for various churches.

The Gemäldegalerie, Berlin has three pictures by Rosselli: a small Entombment of Christ and two altarpieces, one of the Madonna and Child with Angels, Saints and the Martyred Innocents and another of the Madonna of the Rosary.

Rosselli's chief pupil was Piero di Cosimo but he also trained Fra Bartolomeo, Mariotto Albertinelli, and Agnolo di Domenico del Mazziere.

According to Vasari, Rosselli died in 1484, but this is a mistake, as he was known to have been living on 25 November 1506.
