= List of Catholic artists =

This list of Catholic artists concerns artists known, at least in part, for their works of religious Catholic art. It also includes artists whose position as a Roman Catholic priest or missionary was vital to their artistic works or development. It primarily features artists who did at least some of their artwork for Catholic churches, including Eastern Catholic Churches in communion with the Pope.

Note that this is not a list of all artists who have ever been members of the Catholic Church. Further, seeing as many to most Western European artists from the 5th century to the Protestant Reformation did at least some Catholic religious art, this list will supplement by linking to lists of artists of those eras rather than focusing on names of those eras.

== List ==
=== Romanesque artists ===
- Agnes II, Abbess of Quedlinburg, work includes miniatures and engravings; possibly Gothic period

=== Gothic artists ===
- Duccio, Maestà (1308–11), his masterpiece was for Siena's cathedral
- Master Francke, German Gothic painter and Dominican friar
- Giotto, Proto-Renaissance artist with many religious works; the best regarded perhaps is his Cappella degli Scrovegni in the Arena Chapel

=== Renaissance to Rococo ===
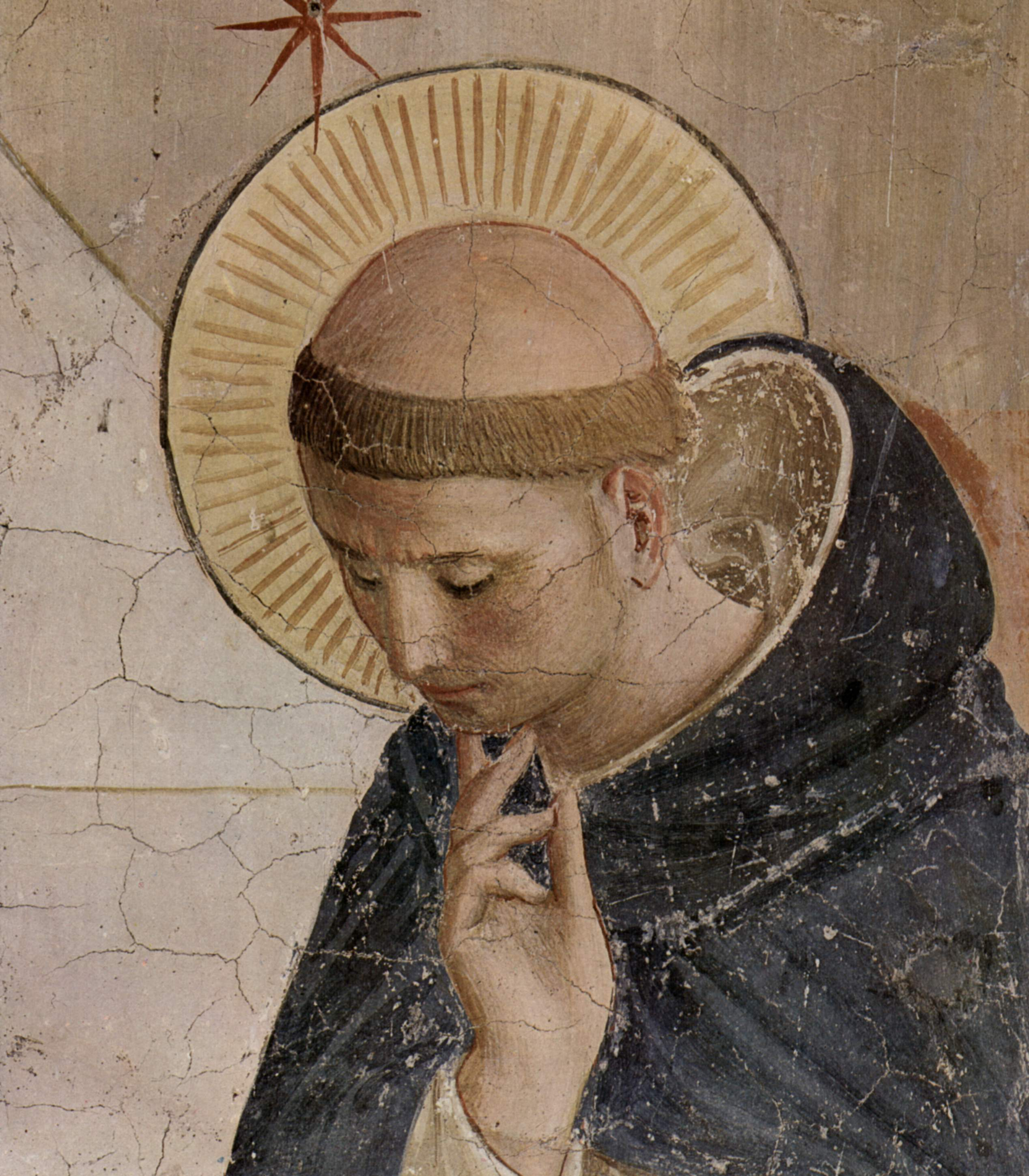
Mid-15th century painting of St. Dominic by beatified artist Fra Angelico

- Juan de la Abadía, Spanish painter in the Spanish-Flemish style; did works in churches and hermitages
- Lambert-Sigisbert Adam, Nicolas-Sébastien Adam, and François Gaspard Adam, French sculptors and brothers; works include church sculptures
- Fra Guglielmo Agnelli, Italian sculptor, architect, and lay brother; among the more noted artists for the Dominican Order
- Angelica Veronica Airola, Baroque painter of religious works; became a nun
- Francesco Albani, works include a Baptism of Christ and frescoes for Santa Maria della Pace
- Cherubino Alberti, director of the Vatican authorized Accademia di San Luca who did work for chapels
- Mariotto Albertinelli, Florentine school painter known for his depiction of The Visitation
- Balthasar Augustin Albrecht, Bavarian painter partly known for an altar piece depicting the Assumption of Mary
- Matteo Perez d'Aleccio, reportedly worked with Michelangelo on the Sistine Chapel
- Martino Altomonte, works include Maria Immaculata and The Ascension of Mary
- Fra Angelico, member of the Dominican Order and a beatified person
- Antonio de Paz, sculptor noted for work in Salamanca's churches and its cathedral
- Niccolò dell'Arca, works include Candlestick-holding Angel in the Arca di San Domenico
- Alberto Arnoldi, 14th-century Italian architect and sculptor; significant to Florence Cathedral and the city's 14th-century art
- Cosmas Damian Asam, German late Baroque/Rococo painter and architect, who worked with his brother Egid Quirin Asam in designing abbeys and churches of Germany
- Egid Quirin Asam, German sculptor and plasterer of late Baroque/Rococo churches and monasteries primarily in Bavaria during the Counter-Reformation; his works include the high altar or figurative art in Weltenburg Abbey, Braunau in Rohr abbey, St. Peter church in Sandizell, Asamkirche in Munich, Fürstenfeld abbey, and the Freising Cathedral, among others
- Jean Denis Attiret, French Jesuit missionary who did paintings for the Cathedral of Avignon and was later honored by the Qianlong Emperor
- Johann Baptist Babel, Swiss sculptor who did work for Einsiedeln Abbey and the Cathedral of Saint Ursus of Solothurn
- Giovanni Baglione, works include frescoes in the vault of the nave of the Basilica di Santa Maria Maggiore
- Roque Balduque, Flemish sculptor and maker of altarpieces; known for works from after he settled in Spain
- Bartolommeo Bandinelli, did bas-reliefs in the choir of the cathedral of Florence
- Barna da Siena, works include Christ Bearing the Cross, with a Dominican Friar
- Federico Barocci, became a lay Capuchin and Counter-Reformation artist
- Fra Bartolomeo, member of a Dominican Order; works include The Vision of St Bernard
- Martino di Bartolomeo, fourteenth-century Italian painter and manuscript illuminator; works include Marian art, church frescoes, altar-pieces, and choirbooks
- Pompeo Batoni, works include Return of the Prodigal Son
- Giuseppe Bazzani, Italian Rococo painter whose religious works include the altarpiece of St Romuald's Vision
- Gaspar Becerra, Spanish Renaissance sculptor and painter; much of his religious art has been destroyed by war
- Giovanni Bellini, did Altarpiece with St Vincent Ferrar
- Johann-Georg Bendl, Bohemian sculptor known for sculptures of saints and angels
- Johann Georg Bergmüller, religious works include Allegory of the Catholic Church and Communion, drawings of Thomas Aquinas, church frescoes
- Gian Lorenzo Bernini, Italian Baroque sculptor, architect, painter, impresario who served under six popes of Rome during the Counter-Reformation, inheriting the role of papal artist from his predecessor, Michelangelo; he was considered the greatest expositor of Roman Baroque sculpture, renowned for creating, among others, the Baldacchino and Cathedra Petri in St. Peter’s Basilica, the Jesuit church Sant’ Andrea al Quirinale in Rome, and the Ecstasy of Saint Teresa in Santa Maria della Vittoria
- Alonso Berruguete, Spanish painter, sculptor, and architect noted for emotive sculptures depicting religious ecstasy or torment
- Trophime Bigot, did a variety of altar-pieces, a depiction of the Assumption of the Virgin, depiction of Judith Beheading Holofernes, and paintings of saints
- Fra Bonaventura Bisi, Franciscan friar who did religious works like Holy Family, with St. John and St. Elisabeth
- Pedro Atanasio Bocanegra, did religious art at the cloister of Nuestra Senora de Gracia and the College of the Jesuits
- Krzysztof Boguszewski, Polish Baroque painter and priest
- Andrea Bolgi, did Saint Helena statue in St. Peter's Basilica
- Boetius à Bolswert, copper-plate engraver who did emblems for the devotional book Pia Desideria and was a member of the Jesuit Sodality of Adult Bachelorhood
- Orazio Borgianni, did religious art in San Silvestro in Capite, San Carlo alle Quattro Fontane, and elsewhere
- Hieronymus Bosch, did Christ Crowned with Thorns, which hangs in the San Lorenzo monastery at El Escorial
- Sandro Botticelli, Virgin and Child with an Angel and The Mystical Nativity are among his religious works; is believed to have become strongly moralistic in later life
- Francesco Botticini, largely known for Marian paintings, such as Assumption of the Virgin
- Valentin de Boulogne, did The Martyrdom of Martinian and Processus and altarpieces for the Holy See
- Dieric Bouts, like many Early Netherlandish painters he did much religious work, such as The Entombment
- Andrea Bregno, Italian Early Renaissance sculptor and architect who did religious sculptures and work on papal tombs
- Charles Le Brun, French Baroque painter whose religious works include The Sleep of Jesus and L'Assomption de la Vierge
- Filippo Brunelleschi, designer of the dome of the Florence Cathedral
- Hannequin de Bruselas, Flemish architect and sculptor who worked as general contractor for Toledo Cathedral.
- Miguel Cabrera, given access to Our Lady of Guadalupe for copies, wrote about the image in Maravilla Americana, and did religious themes
- Guglielmo Caccia and Orsola Maddalena Caccia, father and daughter known for religious art
- Melchiorre Cafà, Maltese sculptor active in Rome; works include Martyrdom of Saint Eustace, Virgin of the Rosary, and Ecstasy of Saint Catherine
- Girolamo Campagna, Northern Italian sculptor who did sculptures of saints and work on altars
- José Campeche, early Puerto Rican painter; although he also did portraits, his religious work is the most abundant of his known production
- Bernardino Campi, works include Immaculée Conception
- Robert Campin, like many Early Netherlandish painters, he did much religious art
- Alonso Cano, Spanish painter, architect, and sculptor known for religious art; also known for generosity, fierce temperament, and antisemitism
- Battistello Caracciolo or "Battistello", Italian caravaggisti whose works include a depiction of the Liberation of Saint Peter for Pio Monte della Misericordia and the Immaculate Conception for the Santa Maria della Stella in Naples
- Caravaggio, religious work includes The Martyrdom of Saint Matthew in the San Luigi dei Francesi
- Carlo Carlone, Italian Rococo artist active in Germany whose works include The Glorification of Saints Felix and Adauctus for the church of San Felice del Benaco
- Fra Carnevale, member of the Dominican Order; works include Christ on the Cross
- The Carracci, relatives who all did at least some religious art
- Juan Carreño de Miranda, noted as a court painter; also did works for convents and churches
- Jaume Cascalls, 14th-century Catalan sculptor linked to works at the Church of St. Mary, Poblet Monastery, Santa Maria de Ripoll, Girona Cathedral, and others
- Giuseppe Castiglione, sent to China as a missionary; also did wall paintings in Jesuit churches in Portugal and Macau
- Catherine of Bologna, Italian nun, saint, and non-professional artist
- Pasquale Cati, known for a depiction of the Matryrdom of Saint Lawrence and a depiction of the Council of Trent
- Bartolomeo Cavaceppi, sculptor who did restoration work for the Vatican and became a Knight of the Golden Spur
- Benvenuto Cellini, employed at the papal mint at Rome during the papacy of Pope Clement VII and later of Pope Paul III
- Giuseppe Cesari, a favorite of Pope Clement VIII, his patron; partly known for religious art for churches
- Petrus Christus, works include Portrait of a Carthusian
- Agostino Ciampelli, trained in the studio of Santi di Tito; works include The Martyrdom of St. Clement I, Pope
- Cimabue, works include a crucifix at Basilica di Santa Croce di Firenze
- Matteo Civitali, noted sculptor and architect who built a chapel that the Holy Face of Lucca is in
- Hendrick de Clerck, Flemish Baroque painter who did an altarpiece
- Joos van Cleve, works include Man with the Rosary and Triptych of Saint Peter, Saint Paul and Saint Andrew
- Giulio Clovio, Italian/Croatian Renaissance painter of Farnese Hours; works include The Towneley Lectionary
- Claudio Coello, Spanish Baroque painter of Portuguese ancestry; worked at the court of Charles II and did much religious art
- Niccolò Antonio Colantonio, largely known for the Delivery of the Franciscan Rule and works for churches
- Sebastiano Conca, works include Christ at the Garden of Gesthemane, The Holy Family with the Infant Saint John the Baptist
- Bartolomeo Coriolano, engraver whose major works include St Jerome in Meditation Before a Crucifix, Herodias with the Head of the Baptist, and The Virgin, with the Infant Sleeping; his daughter Theresa Maria Coriolano was also an engraver of religious works
- Carlo Cornara, Jesuit who did work for the Basilica of Sant'Ambrogio
- Antonio da Correggio, works include Adoration of the Magi, Martyrdom of Four Saints, Assumption of the Virgin, and Mystic Marriage of Saint Catherine
- Pietro da Cortona, Italian Baroque painter and architect who did church ceiling frescoes and church architecture
- Manoel da Costa Ataíde, Brazilian Baroque painter known for painting the ceiling of the Church of Saint Francis of Assisi in Ouro Preto
- Jacques Courtois (Jesuit), painted, in the Cistercian monastery, the Miracle of the Loaves
- Wouter Crabeth I and Wouter Crabeth II, grandfather and grandson whose works include Catholic religious art
- Caspar de Crayer, Flemish Baroque painter; works include Martyrdom of St Blaise and Centurion and Christ
- Il Cerano, did paintings of the Quadroni of St. Charles
- Carlo Crivelli, Italian Renaissance painter
- Baldassare Croce, directed the Accademia di San Luca and did a "Passion cycle" for a basilica
- Szymon Czechowicz, painted The Entombment, pieces depicting St. Stanislaus of Szczepanów, and works for churches
- Baccio D'Agnolo, Italian wood-carver, sculptor, and architect whose works include the campanile of the church of Santo Spirito, Florence
- Lluís Dalmau, 15th-century Catalan painter; works include Virgin of the Consellers
- Fra Diamante, Carmelite friar who assisted Filippo Lippi and did religious frescoes at his convent
- Jacopo di Mino del Pellicciaio, did a painting of the Coronation of the Virgin and aided Bartolo di Fredi on Siena Cathedral
- Lovro Dobričević, 15th-century Croatian painter of altarpieces and church paintings
- Marco d'Oggiono, pupil of Leonardo da Vinci; did frescoes for Santa Maria della Pace and others
- Carlo Dolci, did paintings of saints and Biblical figures; also known for personal piety
- Domenichino, religious art includes his Saint John the Evangelist and Adoration of the Shepherds,
- Donatello, Italian Renaissance sculptor whose religious artworks include Saint Mark, The Feast of Herod, and Judith and Holofernes
- François Duquesnoy, did statues for St. Peter's Basilica
- Jerónimo Jacinto de Espinosa, Valencian Baroque painter; works include es:El milagro del Cristo del Rescate and es:Comunión de la Magdalena
- Fernando Estévez, Canarian known for the copy of the Virgin of Candelaria
- Gentile da Fabriano, Italian painter whose best known works, like Adoration of the Magi, are religious
- Nicolás Factor, Spanish Renaissance painter and beatified person
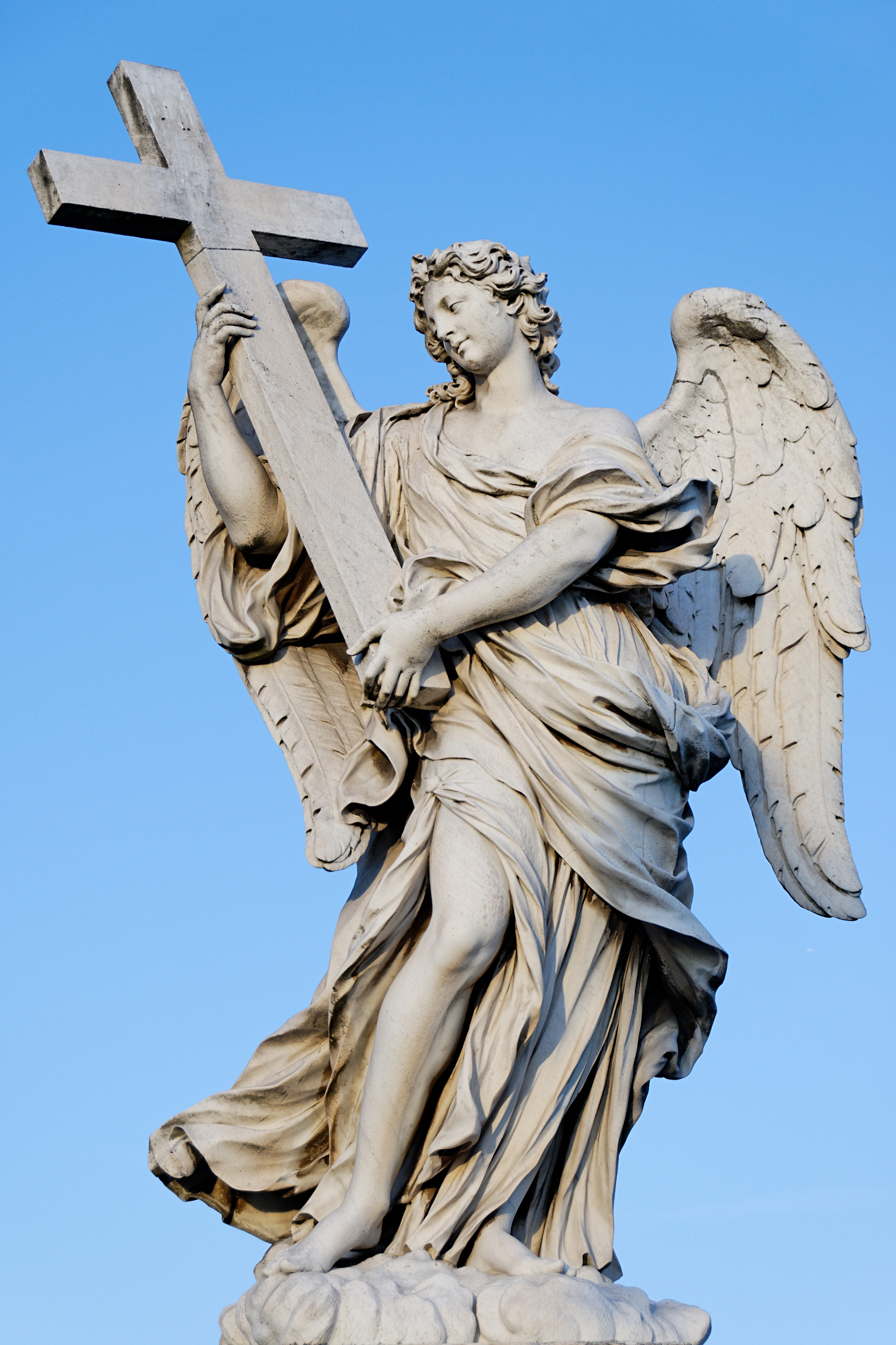
  Angel with a Cross, by Ferrata
- Cosimo Fanzago, Neapolitan Baroque architect and sculptor; religious works include churches and altars
- Garcia Fernandes, Portuguese Renaissance painter of altarpieces and church art
- Gregorio Fernández, Castilian school sculptor for altarpieces and "pasos procesionales"
- Gaudenzio Ferrari, Renaissance painter and sculptor whose works were exclusively, or at least primarily, religious in nature
- Ercole Ferrata, Italian Baroque sculptor whose works include The Death of St. Agnes and Angel with a Cross
- Domenico Fetti, works include several of a religious nature, though much of his religious art was for private devotions
- Joseph Anton Feuchtmayer, "house sculptor" for Salem Abbey
- Juan de Flandes, Early Netherlandish painter active in Spain who concentrated on religious work after 1504
- Bertholet Flemalle, works include Adoration of the Magi for the sacristy of a church of the Augustinians
- Lavinia Fontana, did Saint Francis Receiving the Stigmata, (1579, Diocesan Seminary, Bologna) and work for Pope Paul V
- Damià Forment or "Damian Forment", Spanish Renaissance sculptor known for cathedral work
- Jean Fouquet, religious works include the Pieta of Nouans in the Church of Nouans-les-Fontaines
- Piero della Francesca, religious works include The History of the True Cross, in the Basilica of San Francesco in Arezzo, and The Baptism of Christ
- Bartolo di Fredi, works include an altarpiece in the Siena Cathedral and Presentation of Mary in the Temple
- Agnolo Gaddi, religious works include a painting of the Coronation of the Virgin and frescoes in the choir of the Basilica of Santa Croce, Florence
- Fede Galizia, works include an altarpiece for Saint Maria Maddalena Church and paintings related to the Book of Judith; primarily did still lifes
- Bartolomeo della Gatta, Italian Camaldolese monk who did frescoes on the walls of the Sistine Chapel; later became an abbot
- Bernardino Gatti, also called "il Sojaro"; did several religious works in Parma and Cremona, including an Assumption of Virgin for the Sanctuary of Santa Maria della Steccata
- Giovanni Battista Gaulli, Jesuit noted for Triumph of the Name of Jesus on the ceiling of the Church of the Gesù
- Geertgen tot Sint Jans, 15th-century painter from the Low Countries; works include Nativity at Night
- Artemisia Gentileschi, works include Judith Beheading Holofernes, Virgin Mary and Baby with Rosary, and work with Pope Urban VIII
- Antonio Gherardi, Italian Baroque painter, architect, and stuccoist who did work for many churches
- Lorenzo Ghiberti, sculptor known for the north and east doors of the Florence Baptistery; the Gates of Paradise, and depictions of saints
- Simone Ghini, Italian Renaissance sculptor who did work for popes
- Domenico Ghirlandaio, work includes Vocation of the Apostles
- Caterina Ginnasi, encouraged her uncle, Cardinal Domenico Ginnasi, to build a convent and did religious art for churches
- Hugo van der Goes, joined the Congregation of Windesheim; many of his works are religious art
- Nuno Gonçalves, forerunner of the Portuguese Renaissance; largely known for the Saint Vincent Panels
- Benozzo Gozzoli, work includes frescoes in the Magi Chapel and paintings of saints and Mother Mary
- Matthias Grünewald, German Catholic religious artist
- Guercino, The Burial of St. Petronilla
- Ignaz Günther, Bavarian Rococo sculptor and woodcarver best remembered for his work in churches
- Matthäus Günther, German Baroque/Rococo artist who did frescoes for many churches and monasteries
- Francisco Herrera the Elder and Francisco Herrera the Younger, Spanish Golden Age father and son who both did noted church paintings
- Adriaen Isenbrandt, works include a depiction of the Mass of Saint Gregory and a triptych with the Assumption of Mary
- Jan Janssens, Flemish Baroque painter and Ghent Caravaggisti whose works conformed to the Counter-Reformation
- André Jean, member of the Dominican Order partly known for paintings depicting scenes in the New Testament
- Jean Jouvenet, Magnificat in the choir of Notre-Dame
- Martin Knoller, Austrian/Italian who painted frescoes for Neresheim Abbey, Ettal Abbey, and other abbeys, as well as altarpieces
- Adam Kraft, known for work in cathedrals and churches
- Giovanni Lanfranco, Italian Baroque painter who did much religious art and was honored by the Accademia di San Luca
- Georges de La Tour, French Baroque painter whose works include Magdalen with the Smoking Flame
- Francesco Laurana, Dalmatian/Italian sculptor and medallist whose religious art includes statues of saints and Mary
- Tommaso Laureti, Noted work in Santa Susanna and a fresco series on a post-Council of Trent triumphalist theme for Pope Gregory XIII
- Bernardo de Legarda, Quito School sculptor noted for Marian sculptures
- Pierre Le Gros the Younger, sculptor of Religion Overthrowing Heresy and Hatred in Church of the Gesù and other religious art
- Diego de Leyva, primarily produced religious art after retiring to a Carthusian monastery
- Filippo Lippi, Carmelite who painted for a convent chapel at Prato; this led to an affair with Lucrezia Buti and to a son, Filippino Lippi
- Filippino Lippi, his frescoes depicting the life of Philip the Apostle are in the Basilica di Santa Maria Novella
- Alejandro de Loarte, painted a Miracle of the Loaves and Fishes (1622) for the Mission Friars; also did paintings of saints
- Barbara Longhi, her devotional art is said to reflect the Counter-Reformation
- Gregório Lopes, Portuguese painter, primarily a religious artist
- Ambrogio Lorenzetti and Pietro Lorenzetti, brothers whose works include Presentation at the Temple and Madonna dei Tramonti
- Claude Lorrain, although best known for landscape painting, also did religious art; his work is said to be influenced by the worldview of the Counter-Reformation
- Lorenzo Lotto, became a Franciscan lay brother; religious art includes Recanati Annunciation and Recanati Polyptych
- Bernardino Luini, a Leonardeschi; religious works include depictions of Mother Mary
- Benedetto da Maiano and Giuliano da Maiano, Italian brothers who did a variety of religious sculpture and architecture
- Juan Bautista Maíno, Spanish Baroque painter and Dominican friar who did work for the church of San Pedro Mártir among others
- Jean Malouel, early Dutch painter of much religious art
- Andrea Mantegna, The Lamentation over the Dead Christ
- Carlo Maratta, works include Immaculate Conception; knighted in 1704 by Pope Clement XI
- Juan Martínez Montañés, many of his works are religious in nature, as is common to the Sevillian school of sculpture
- Simone Martini, died in the service of the Papal court at Avignon in 1344
- Masaccio, works include Virgin and Child with St. Anne
- Franz Anton Maulbertsch, Austrian Rococo painter who did ecclesiastical themes for many churches, including a Piarist Church in Vienna
- Guido Mazzoni, Italian Renaissance sculptor noted for a depiction of the Lamentation of Christ (Compianta)
- Pier Francesco Mazzucchelli, called "Il Morazzone"; has works in the Quadroni of St. Charles and painted altarpieces for many churches in Northern Italy
- Hans Memling, Early Netherlandish artist; works include The Last Judgment and St. Ursula Shrine
- Lippo Memmi, painter of Annunciation with St. Margaret and St. Ansanus
- Pedro de Mena, Spanish sculptor for convents and cathedrals
- Anton Raphael Mengs, Bohemian Neoclassical painter; after converting, painted religious works including The Glory of Saint Eusebius
- Juan de Mesa, creator of several of the effigies that are used in the procession during the Holy Week in Seville
- Antonello da Messina, works include Annunciation and Crucifixion
- Domenico di Michelino, primarily Biblical and religious scenes
- Michelangelo Buonarroti, Italian High Renaissance painter, architect, sculptor under the patronage of the popes of Rome during the reconstruction of St. Peter’s Basilica, from the Renaissance towards the early Counter-Reformation era; renowned for painting, among others, the Last Judgment and the Sistine Chapel ceiling
- Michelozzo, did numerous statues of saints found at basilicas in Italy
- Jan Miel, painted in the Roman church of Santa Maria dell'Anima for the chapel of San Lamberto and did other church art
- Josef Ignaz Mildorfer, Austrian who primarily painted religious-themed altarpieces and frescoes on subjects like the Pentecost and the Assumption of Mary
- Francesco Mochi, statue of Saint Veronica in St. Peter's Basilica
- Gabriel Móger, Mallorcan who did work on retables and altarpieces by the churches of Mallorca
- Lorenzo Monaco, Camaldolese painter who did a noted Predella
- Pierre-Étienne Monnot, French Baroque sculptor who did work for the Archbasilica of St. John Lateran and the Santa Maria della Vittoria
- Baccio and Raffaello da Montelupo, father and son whose work includes sculptures of saints and angels, made during the Italian Renaissance
- Giovanni Angelo Montorsoli, Servite friar and sculptor who did a marble altarpiece of the Annunciation of Mary
- Luis de Morales, Spanish painter of primarily religious subjects
- Giovanni Maria Morlaiter, did most of the sculptures in Santa Maria del Rosario, a Dominican Order church
- Bartolomé Esteban Murillo, best known for his Roman Catholic religious works
- Girolamo Muziano, works include Resurrection of Lazarus led a team which did works on Church history
- Tommaso Napoli, Sicilian Baroque architect of cathedrals and a member of the Dominican Order
- Nicolau Nasoni, Italian architect and artist active in Portugal who did work for the Porto Cathedral, built the Clérigos Church, and did work for other churches
- Juan Fernández Navarrete, deaf Spanish painter noted for his depictions of the Baptism of Christ, The Nativity, and Abraham
- Pieter Neeffs I, Pieter Neeffs II, and Ludovicus Neefs, Flemish Baroque painters noted for depicting church interiors
- Plautilla Nelli, nun and religious artist
- Balthasar Neumann, German Rococo architect and military artillery engineer, renowned for designing the Würzburg Residence, the Gößweinstein Basilica of the Holy Trinity and the Basilica of the Fourteen Holy Helpers (Vierzehnheiligen) in Franconia, Germany among others
- Giovanni Niccolo, Jesuit in Japan, known for works of Salvator Mundi and The Madonna
- Dello di Niccolò Delli, Italian sculptor known for the apse cycle in the Old Cathedral, Salamanca
- Josefa de Óbidos, one of the leading women Baroque painters; also did altarpieces
- Vincenzo Onofri, Bolognese Renaissance sculptor of altars and a bust of Albertus Magnus, known for terracotta
- Gilles-Marie Oppenordt, French designer and architect whose works include the chapel of St. John the Baptist in Amiens Cathedral
- Bartolomé Ordóñez, Spanish Renaissance sculptor who did work for churches and tombs
- Lorenzo Ottoni, best known for Counter-Reformation religious sculpture
- Francisco Pacheco, painter who taught Diego Velázquez and felt artists' role was to "instill piety and to lead people to God"
- Antonio Palomino, art writer and biographer who did a fresco for the sacristy of the Granada Charterhouse; became a priest after his wife's death
- Giovanni di Paolo, Sienese School painter known for somewhat dreamlike religious art, such as Miracle of St. Nicholas of Tolentino
- Parmigianino, works include Circumcision of Jesus, Vision of Saint Jerome, and Madonna with the Long Neck
- Pietro Perugino, did Moses Leaving to Egypt, Baptism of Christ, and Delivery of the Keys at the Sistine Chapel
- Baldassare Peruzzi, did ceiling decorations at the Vatican, and an altar at Siena
- Francesco Pesellino, work includes a predella
- Georg Petel, German sculptor; works include wood and ivory crucifixes, and a carved figure of Saint Christopher
- Giovanni Battista Piazzetta, Italian Baroque/Rococo painter; works include The Glory of St. Dominic and Assumption of The Virgin
- Isabella Piccini, Catholic nun and engraver
- Anton Pichler, Giovanni Pichler, and Luigi Pichler, family of gem engravers who did work for popes
- Sano di Pietro, like many in the Sienese School, many of his works are religious in nature
- Anton Pilgram, Austrian/German sculptor and architect who worked on cathedrals and altars
- Pinturicchio, worked with several Popes and did frescoes for the Piccolomini Library adjoining Siena Cathedral
- Sebastiano del Piombo, The Raising of Lazarus, and the altarpiece for Chigi Chapel
- Pietro del Po, Giacomo del Po, and Teresa del Po, a father and two of his children who were members of the Accademia di San Luca and did religious art
- Tobias Pock, Austrian/Swabian noted for Coronation of Virgin Mary and many paintings of saints found in churches
- Antonio del Pollaiuolo and Piero del Pollaiuolo, brothers whose works include the Martyrdom of Saint Sebastian and work at the Basilica di San Lorenzo di Firenze
- Pontormo, works include Annunciation, Madonna with Child and Saints, The Deposition from the Cross and St. Quentin
- Nicolas Poussin, Baroque/Classical painter; works include Seven Sacraments
- Andrea Pozzo, Jesuit brother known for the ceiling of Sant'Ignazio Church in Rome
- Mattia Preti, Italian Baroque artist who did religious works in Naples and also in Malta, specifically St. John's Co-Cathedral
- Scipione Pulzone, portrait artist whose religious works include Mater Divinae Providentiae, Our Lady of the Assumption, and Christ on the Cross with Saints
- Enguerrand Quarton, 15th-century French artist of many religious paintings, including a rendition of the Coronation of the Virgin
- Jacopo della Quercia, Italian Renaissance sculptor of altarpieces, statues of saints, and statues of Mother Mary
- Diego Quispe Tito, Cuzco School painter of Virgin of Carmel Saving Souls in Purgatory and scenes of Christ
- Ignác Raab, Czech Jesuit who did notable paintings of saints
- Raffaellino del Colle, several works of Marian art
- Antonio Raggi, Baroque sculptor from Ticino whose works include Death of Saint Cecilia, Baptism of Christ, and Angel with the Column
- Ivan Ranger, monastic noted for paintings in churches, chapels, and monasteries
- Raphael, Transfiguration is one of his religious works and is housed in the Pinacoteca Vaticana of Vatican City
- Guido Reni - Italian Baroque painter of frescoes like St Dominic's Glory and paintings such as Assumption of Mary
- Francisco Ribalta, Spanish Baroque painter
- Jusepe de Ribera, Spanish/Neapolitan associated to Tenebrism; partly noted for depictions of martyrdom found in Neapolitan churches
- Ricardo do Pilar, German/Brazilian monk whose paintings include Apparition of Our Lady to St. Bernard
- Sebastiano Ricci, did a variety of works for Popes and did altarpieces
- Giuliano da Rimini, known for altarpieces, a rendition of the Coronation of the Virgin, and possibly part of a Rimini school of painting
- Jacopo Ripanda, known for frescoes in churches and Vatican palaces
- Juan Rizi, Spanish Baroque painter who did paintings of saints; was made an archbishop by Pope Clement X
- Francesco Robba, Venetian Baroque sculptor and architect; did work for churches in Slovenia and Croatia
- Luca della Robbia, sculptor whose works include The Nativity, circa 1460, and Madonna and Child, circa 1475
- Pedro Roldán and Luisa Roldán, father and daughter who both did religious sculpture linked to the Sevillian school of sculpture
- Antoniazzo Romano, Decoration of the Vatican Palace and frescoes in Santa Maria sopra Minerva
- Paolo Romano, early Renaissance sculptor who worked for Popes and did a notable sculpture of Saint Paul
- Cosimo Rosselli, works include Last Supper and Descent from Mount Sinai
- Antonio and Bernardo Rossellino, brothers who did religious works for churches
- Angelo de Rossi, did sculptures for Popes; is linked to the Accademia di San Luca
- Peter Paul Rubens, Catholic convert; Flemish painter of Northern Baroque who produced numerous artworks of the Counter-Reformation and served under the patronage of the Habsburg rulers of Spain and Flanders; renowned for his works, among others, in Saint Bavo Cathedral and the Cathedral of Our Lady (Antwerp)
- Camillo Rusconi, Italian late-Baroque sculptor whose masterpieces are said to be four sculptures of apostles (Matthew, James the Great, Andrew, and John)
- Guillem Sagrera, Catalan sculptor and architect from Mallorca; director of the works of the Perpignan Cathedral and others
- Ventura Salimbeni, Sienese School artist whose works include Disputa of the Eucharist; became a Knight of the Golden Spur for his work in the Basilica of San Pietro
- Francisco Salzillo, Spanish Baroque sculptor who did work for a Capuchin monastery in the Region of Murcia and churches in the area
- Stanisław Samostrzelnik, Polish painter of frescoes in Catholic churches
- Juan Sánchez Cotán, although best known for Bodegónes, he was a prolific religious painter and entered a Carthusian monastery
- Andrea Sansovino, High Renaissance sculptor who did work for the Genoa Cathedral, the Santa Maria in Aracoeli, and the Basilica of Sant'Agostino
- Jacopo Sansovino, the statue Madonna del Parto in the Basilica of Sant'Agostino; student of Andrea Sansovino
- Basilio Santa Cruz Pumacallao, Cuzco School painter of A Franciscan Allegory of the Immaculate Virgin; supervised paintings of the Corpus Christi procession
- Carlo Saraceni, Caravaggisti whose religious art includes an altarpiece in the Roman church of San Lorenzo in Lucina
- Andrea del Sarto, work includes paintings for the Santissima Annunziata, Florence
- Sassetta, like much of the Sienese School, he did religious art, including the Mystic Marriage of St. Francis
- Giovanni Battista Salvi da Sassoferrato, work includes paintings of Mother Mary
- Christoph Thomas Scheffler, Jesuit who did portraits of Jesuit astronomers and frescoes in St. Paulinus' and other churches
- Martin Johann Schmidt, Austrian Baroque/Rococo painter who primarily painted devotional images
- Martin Schongauer, engraver mostly known for religious works such as Christi Geburt and Maria im Rosenhag
- Johann Paul Schor, worked on the Siena Cathedral
- Gerard Seghers, Flemish Baroque painter and Caravaggisti whose works include an Adoration of the Magi in the Church of Our Lady, Bruges
- Giacomo Serpotta, stuccoist from Palermo who did a great deal of his work for churches
- Luca Signorelli, his masterpiece is considered to be his fresco of the Last Judgment (1499) in Orvieto Cathedral
- Diego Siloe, a founding figure in the Granadan school of sculpture and a church architect
- Gherardo Silvani, Italian architect and sculptor of the Baroque who did much work on the San Gaetano, Florence
- Elisabetta Sirani, works include a painting in the Basilica di San Marino and an Assumption of the Virgin
- Michael Sittow, Estonian trained in the Early Netherlandish painting style; did a mix of small devotional art and portraits
- Claus Sluter, Dutch/French Renaissance Northern Renaissance sculptor noted for the Well of Moses
- Leonello Spada, Caravaggisti whose paintings include St Dominic Burning the Books of the Heretics in the Basilica of San Domenico
- Massimo Stanzione, Italian Baroque painter whose religious works include a depiction of The Assumption of the Virgin and one of Judith with the Head of Holofernes
- Johann Baptist Straub and Philipp Jakob Straub, Baroque sculptors who did much church art
- Bernardo Strozzi, a Capuchin for several years; works include Christ Giving the Keys of Heaven to St. Peter
- Pierre Subleyras, religious art includes Saint John of Ávila and Marriage of St Catherine
- Giovanni Francesco Susini, Florentine Mannerist sculptor who did some religious art
- Carpoforo Tencalla, Swiss-Italian Baroque painter who did work in several churches and monasteries
- Giovanni Battista Tiepolo, religious works include Pope St. Clement Adoring the Trinity, Institution of the Rosary, and The Immaculate Conception
- Tintoretto, Venetian painter, who worked on Church commission for artworks; contributed Marriage at Cana to the Santa Maria della Salute
- Benvenuto Tisi, sometimes called "Il Garofalo"; a great deal of his works are religious
- Titian, the most represented artist in the Basilica di Santa Maria della Salute; served the Holy Roman Emperor Charles V from the Renaissance to the Counter-Reformation era; was at the Council of Trent
- Santi di Tito, works include Vision of Saint Thomas Aquinas and Annunciation
- Luis Tristán, Spanish Baroque painter; one of his most important paintings is an altar image in the church of Yepes
- Paul Troger, did frescoes for several abbeys and also Apotheosis of Saint Ignatius in St. Ignatius’ church in Győr, Hungary
- Paolo Uccello, works include Saint George and the Dragon, Nun-Saint with Two Children, and Life of the Holy Fathers
- Andrea Vaccaro, Tenebrist style painter known for paintings of saints
- Juan de Valdés Leal, works include The Assumption of the Virgin and Virgin of the Immaculate Conception with Sts Andrew and John the Baptist
- Hubert van Eyck, worked on Ghent Altarpiece
- Jan van Eyck, works include Virgin and Child with Canon van der Paele, and work on the Ghent Altarpiece
- Luis de Vargas, Spanish painter, influenced by Mannerism; painted altarpieces and other religious works in Seville; reportedly quite devout
- Giorgio Vasari, An Allegory of the Immaculate Conception; a Knight of the Golden Spur; perhaps better known as a biographer
- Gregorio Vasquez de Arce y Ceballos, most of his work is religious in nature
- Juan Bautista Vázquez the Elder and Juan Bautista Vázquez the Younger, both sculpted Catholic religious art as did most in the Sevillian school of sculpture
- Vecchietta, religious art in the Cappella del Sacro Chiodo and in varied churches
- Diego Velázquez, portrait artist whose religious works include Christ in the House of Martha and Mary and Temptation of St. Thomas
- Domenico Veneziano, Santa Lucia de' Magnoli Altarpiece
- Giuseppe Vermiglio, Caravaggisti whose works are believed to include The Incredulity of St. Thomas, Crowning with Thorns / Mocking of Christ and Saint Jerome
- Paolo Veronese, The Adoration of the Magi on the ceiling of the Capella del Rosario and The Wedding at Cana for San Giorgio Monastery
- Leonardo da Vinci, The Last Supper at Santa Maria delle Grazie is perhaps his most famous religious work
- Daniele da Volterra, known for his painting Descent from the Cross in the Trinità dei Monti and for being hired to cover the genitals in Michelangelo's The Last Judgment
- Simon Vouet, works include Saint Jerome, The Conversion of the Magdalen, and The Virgin and Child
- Johann Peter Alexander Wagner, Rococo sculptor of Stations of the Cross, a crucifix, and other religious art
- Rogier van der Weyden, early Netherlandish painter of many works of religious art
- Wu Li, Chinese landscape painter, poet, and member of the Society of Jesus
- Fernando Yáñez de la Almedina, Spanish Renaissance art whose works were often religious
- Francisco Tito Yupanqui, known for Marian statues such as Virgin of Copacabana; there is an effort to have him beatified
- Marcos Zapata, like many of the Cuzco School, his works dealt with religious subjects
- Juan Zariñena, primarily religious painter from Valencia
- Johann Jakob Zeiller, Austrian known for religious frescoes like those at Aldersbach Abbey in Fürstenzell and the Ettal Abbey
- Januarius Zick, German architect and painter of the Late Baroque who did art for various monasteries and churches
- Giuseppe Zimbalo, Leccesi architect and sculptor; did the façade of the Basilica of Santa Croce
- Dominikus Zimmermann and Johann Baptist Zimmermann, German brothers who did church architecture, stucco, and painting
- Francisco de Zurbarán, works include the great altarpiece of St. Thomas Aquinas, Immaculate Conception, and paintings of Carthusians
- Federico Zuccari, Pauline chapel of the Vatican and The Last Judgment inside the dome of the Florence Cathedral

=== Nineteenth century to present ===
- Ephraim Francis Baldwin, designed St. Leo's Church and won a Benemerenti medal for his work on The Catholic University of America
- Cajetan J. B. Baumann, Franciscan friar and church architect
- Ade Bethune, liturgical artist linked to the Catholic Worker Movement
- Jean-Baptiste Bethune, called by some the "Pugin of Belgium"; founder of the Catholic Gild de St. Thomas et de St. Luc
- Gilbert R. Blount, English Catholic architect of St Mary Magdalen's Church in Brighton
- Giuseppe Calì, Maltese painter who did paintings for many churches
- Antonio Castillo Lastrucci, Andalusian sculptor known for religious works in the Cathedral of St Mary of the Assumption in Ceuta, around Seville, and elsewhere
- Eduardo Castrillo, Filipino sculptor noted partly for religious art including a depiction of Saint Pedro Calungsod
- Paul Cézanne, Post-Impressionist whose early works include some religious art such as Christ in Limbo
- Albert Chmielowski, saint; founder of the Albertine Brothers, who did art, such as a depiction of Ecce homo, before taking up the religious life and serving the poor
- Antonio Ciseri, nineteenth-century religious artist originally from Ticino; works include Ecce Homo and The Transport of Christ to the Sepulcher
- Philip Lindsey Clark, works include a Stations of the Cross sculpture; after 1930 "all his RA exhibits were of religious and often specifically Catholic subjects;" became a Carmelite Tertiary
- John Collier, convert, sculptor of Catholic memorial at Ground Zero in New York City

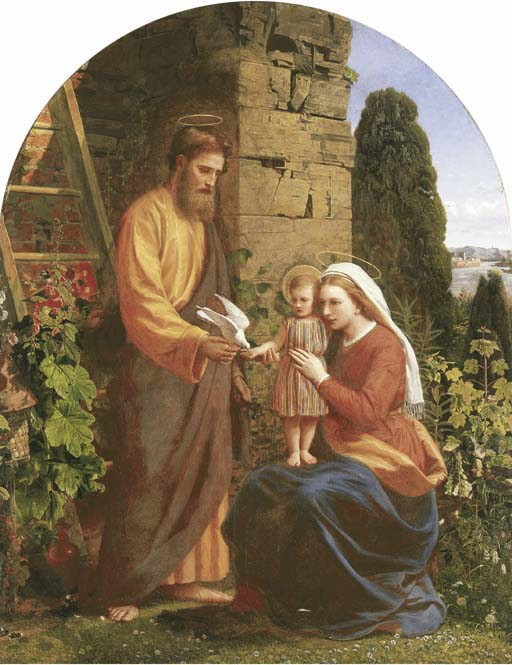
James Collinson was a convert and Pre-Raphaelite. This is his 1878 depiction of the Holy Family.

- James Collinson
- William Congdon, after his conversion in 1959 he began his Crocefissi (Crucifixion) series
- Jean-Georges Cornélius, French religious painter
- João Zeferino da Costa, Brazilian painter of panels in the Candelária Church
- Marie-Alain Couturier (Dominican friar), stained glass and sacred art in modern form
- Luigi Crosio, painted the Refugium Peccatorum Madonna
- Salvador Dalí, created numerous large-scale religious compositions starting around the time of his repatriation in Spain
- Sylvia Daoust, did work for Mary, Queen of the World, Cathedral; most of her work is religious
- Henry Darger, outsider artist, writer, and illustrator from Chicago, US
- Anne Davidson, known for secular sculpture; religious works include Saint Margaret of Scotland and Resurrection; belonged to the Society of Catholic Artists
- Maurice Denis, artist linked to Les Nabis; afterward he joined a third order and did religious art
- Jan Henryk de Rosen, convert with works displayed at the Basilica of the National Shrine of the Immaculate Conception and elsewhere
- Melchior Paul von Deschwanden, 19th-century Swiss painter primarily known for Catholic religious art
- Czesław Dźwigaj, monuments to Pope John Paul II
- Joseph-Hugues Fabisch, famous for The Virgin of Lourdes, which caused controversy as St. Bernadette Soubirous did not approve
- Thomasita Fessler, nun who designed stained glass windows and founded the art department at Cardinal Stritch University
- Jean-Hippolyte Flandrin, works include St. Clare Healing the Blind and other art for churches
- Arthur Fleischmann, works include sculptures of popes and a Tryptych of the Holy Rosary for Westminster Cathedral
- Moira Forsyth, stained glass artist; former President of the Society of Catholic Artists; works appear in Catholic and Anglican churches
- Tsuguharu Foujita, designer and fresco painter of Foujita Chapel on Mumm's estate, Reims, France
- Michael Sigismund Frank, glass painter and Catholic artist
- Ernst Fuchs, a founder of the Vienna School of Fantastic Realism; converted to Catholicism; did the cycle Mysteries of the Holy Rosary
- Yasutake Funakoshi, Japanese convert who did sculptures of the Twenty-six Martyrs of Japan and was honored by a Pope
- Antoni Gaudí, architect of Sagrada Família (there are efforts to have him beatified)
- Gregory Gerrer, Benedictine priest; did a portrait of Pope Pius X; co-founded the Association of Oklahoma Artists
- James Gillick, contemporary English painter of ecclesiastical works such as the altarpiece at St. Neots, Cambridgeshire and the reredos at SS Gregory and Augustine's
- George Goldie, specialized in Catholic churches, including St. Ignatius Church, Wishaw
- Matthias Laurenz Gräff, Austrian artist of the 21st century, also paints religious and religious-historical themes such as the life of Jesus Christ, themes from the Holy Bible and of the genres Vanitas and Memento mori
- Félix Granda, priest, sculptor, metalsmith, craftsman, and founder of the liturgical art workshop Talleres de Arte
- Matthew Ellison Hadfield, English architect noted for Gothic Revival churches like Salford Cathedral and St Vincent's Church in Sheffield
- Joseph Hansom, English architect who worked on Arundel Cathedral and other Catholic churches
- William Laurel Harris, convert who did murals for the Paulist Fathers
- John Rogers Herbert, his conversion is significant to his artistic history; most of his post-conversion art is religious
- John Hogan, Irish sculptor of The Dead Christ
- Evie Hone, spent time in an Anglican convent; after converting to Catholicism she did stained glass works for Catholic churches
- Maria Innocentia Hummel, nun and artist known for figurines, but whose suffering under Nazi rule lead her to do the work The Stations of the Cross
- Mary Concepta Lynch (1874 – 1939), was an Irish nun and skilled calligrapher, decorated Dominican Oratory in Dublin.
- Berthold Imhoff, Knight of St. Gregory the Great known for his religious murals and paintings
- Franz Ittenbach, German artist and member of the Nazarene movement
- Louis Janmot, French religious painter and poet

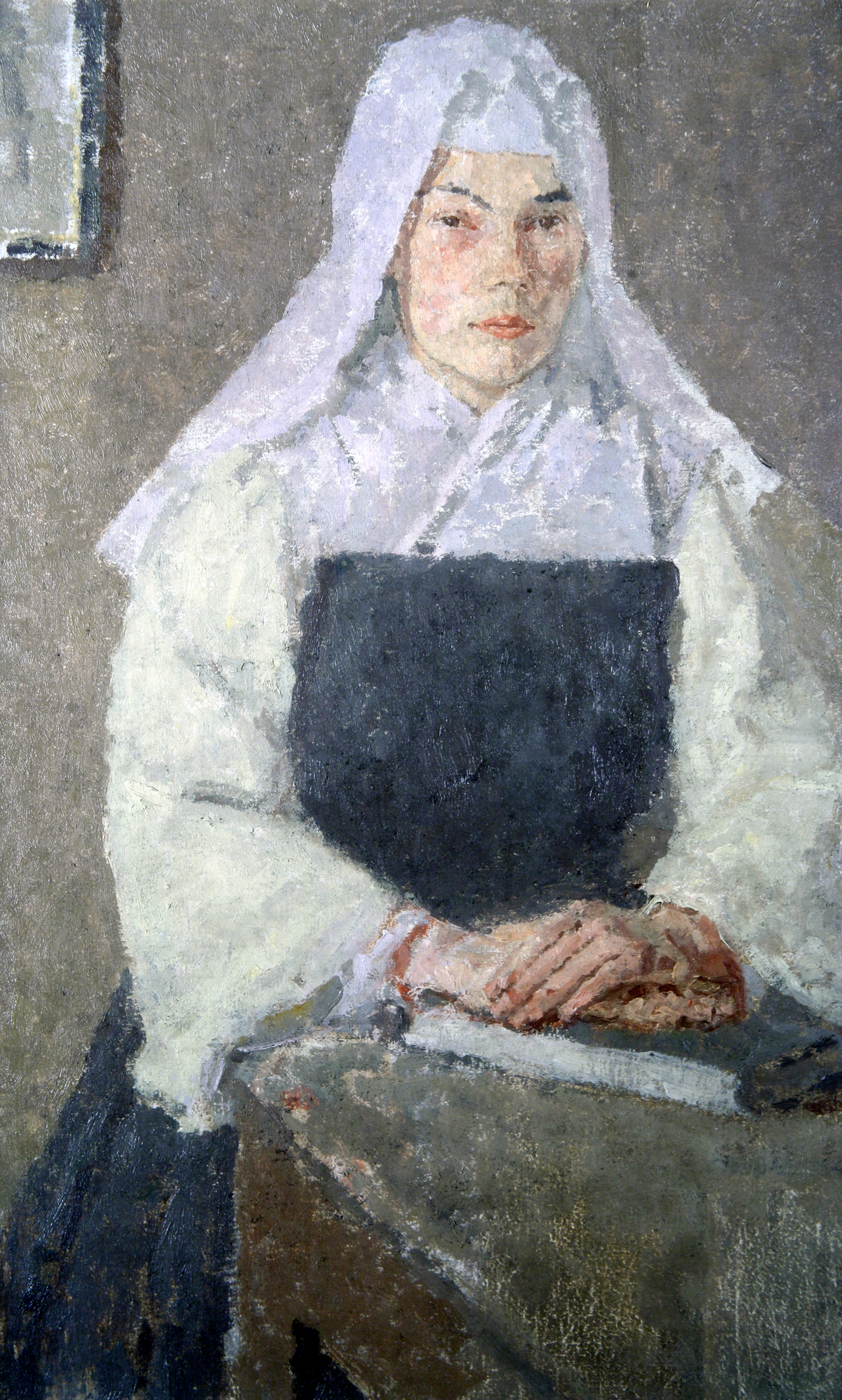
Gwen John's painting The Nun, c. 1915-1920

- Gwen John, Welsh artist; after converting, did religious art for a convent
- David Jones, convert whose works include Sanctus Christus de Capel-y-ffin; better known as a poet
- Patrick Keely, architect of numerous churches such as St. Mary's Church Complex
- Jano Köhler, Czech painter, decorated sacral buildings with frescoes and sgraffiti
- Adam Kossowski, former gulag inmate and a religious artist who joined the Guild of Catholic Artists and Craftsmen in 1944
- William Kurelek, convert from Orthodoxy noted for paintings of Christ
- Desiderius Lenz, Jan Verkade, and Gabriel Wüger, Benedictines belonging to the largely religious Beuron school
- Leandro Locsin, architect of the Church of the Holy Sacrifice
- Maurice Loriaux, founder of Santa Fé Studios of Church Art; ecclesiologist
- Fred McCarthy, Secular Franciscan Order member best known as the cartoonist of Brother Jupiter; also did religious paintings
- Charles Donagh Maginnis, Catholic church architect
- Friedrich Wilhelm Mengelberg, German-Dutch convert whose works include church interiors and religious sculpture
- Ivan Meštrović, Croatian religious sculptor; works include St. Jerome the Priest
- Rudolf Moroder-Lenèrt, painter; did primarily religious sculpture, including a Stations of the Cross for the Church of St. Ann in Silesia and a sculpture of St. Elizabeth of Hungary for the Exposition Universelle in 1900
- Antonio Moscheni, Jesuit painter known for painting at the chapel; St. Aloysius College (Mangalore)
- Esther Newport, member of the Sisters of Providence of Saint Mary-of-the-Woods; founded the Catholic Art Association
- Guido Nincheri, artist for Catholic churches in Canada; Pope Pius XI named him Knight-Commander of the Order of Saint-Sylvester
- Erik Olson, Swedish convert; painted a triptych in 1977 for the Vatican Museum in Rome
- Francis Petre, Catholic architect of cathedrals in New Zealand
- Edith Pfau, nun known for the works Risen Christ, Stations of the Cross and Madonna and Child
- Jože Plečnik, Slovene architect who built Church of the Most Sacred Heart of Our Lord
- Alois Plum, praised by Cardinal Karl Lehmann for his church art
- Thomas Henry Poole, British-born architect of St. Catherine of Genoa's Church and other churches in the New York City area
- Augustus Pugin, Catholic convert and noted architect; did the interior of St Chad's Cathedral in Birmingham; designed Erdington Abbey
- E. W. Pugin and Peter Paul Pugin, sons of Augustus and church architects in their own right
- Luis Ramacciotti, known for a sculpture of Christ in La Cumbre, Argentina
- Georges Rouault, noted for paintings of Christ; a friend to Catholic philosopher Jacques Maritain
- Tito Sarrocchi, did façades for the Basilica of Santa Croce, Florence
- Friedrich Wilhelm Schadow, convert; like many others in the Nazarene movement, produced Catholic art
- Steven Schloeder, contemporary architect, theologian, and author
- Francis C. Schroen, Jesuit brother and church architect
- Alexander Maximilian Seitz, did paintings of Christ and saints
- Gino Severini, associated with Futurism and did church mosaics
- Joseph Sibbel, German/American sculptor; works include Stations of the Cross, Doctor of the Church, and a marble statue representing Purgatory
- Etsuro Sotoo, sculptor with Sagrada Família
- Mary Stanisia, member of the School Sisters of Notre Dame who did paintings for the Roman Catholic Diocese of Fort Wayne-South Bend
- Giovanni Strazza, known for The Veiled Virgin, which was delivered to Bishop John T. Mullock
- Imogen Stuart, contemporary convert known for a monument to Pope John Paul II at St Patrick's College, Maynooth and works at Mary Immaculate College
- Jan Styka, Polish artist known in part for his large depiction of the Crucifixion of Jesus
- Pietro Tenerani, works include a relief of the Descent from the Cross and a colossal statue of St. Alphonsus Maria de Liguori; commissioned for the Tomb of Pope Pius VIII
- Włodzimierz Tetmajer, Polish artist; specialized in religious themes; has works in Our Lady of the Angels’ Basilica
- James Tissot, after a reconversion he did works like Crucifixion, seen from the Cross, which were part of a series called The Life of Jesus Christ
- Jean Baptiste van Eycken, Belgian painter of works for the Église de la Chapelle
- Adrian Wewer, Franciscan friar and architect of churches, seminaries, friaries, and convents
- Paul Woodroffe, book illustrator and stained glass artist for chapels and churches
- Mihaela Adelgundis Černic, Slovenian artist, School sister of Notre Dame and teacher of art and painting; painted a lot of religious paintings

== See also ==
- Baroque
- Early Netherlandish painting
- List of illuminated manuscripts
- Lists of Roman Catholics
- Marian art in the Catholic Church
- Roman Catholic art
- Silent preaching
- Spanish Golden Age
