= Baptism of Christ (Perugino, Rome) =

Fresco by Pietro Perugino in the Sistine Chapel

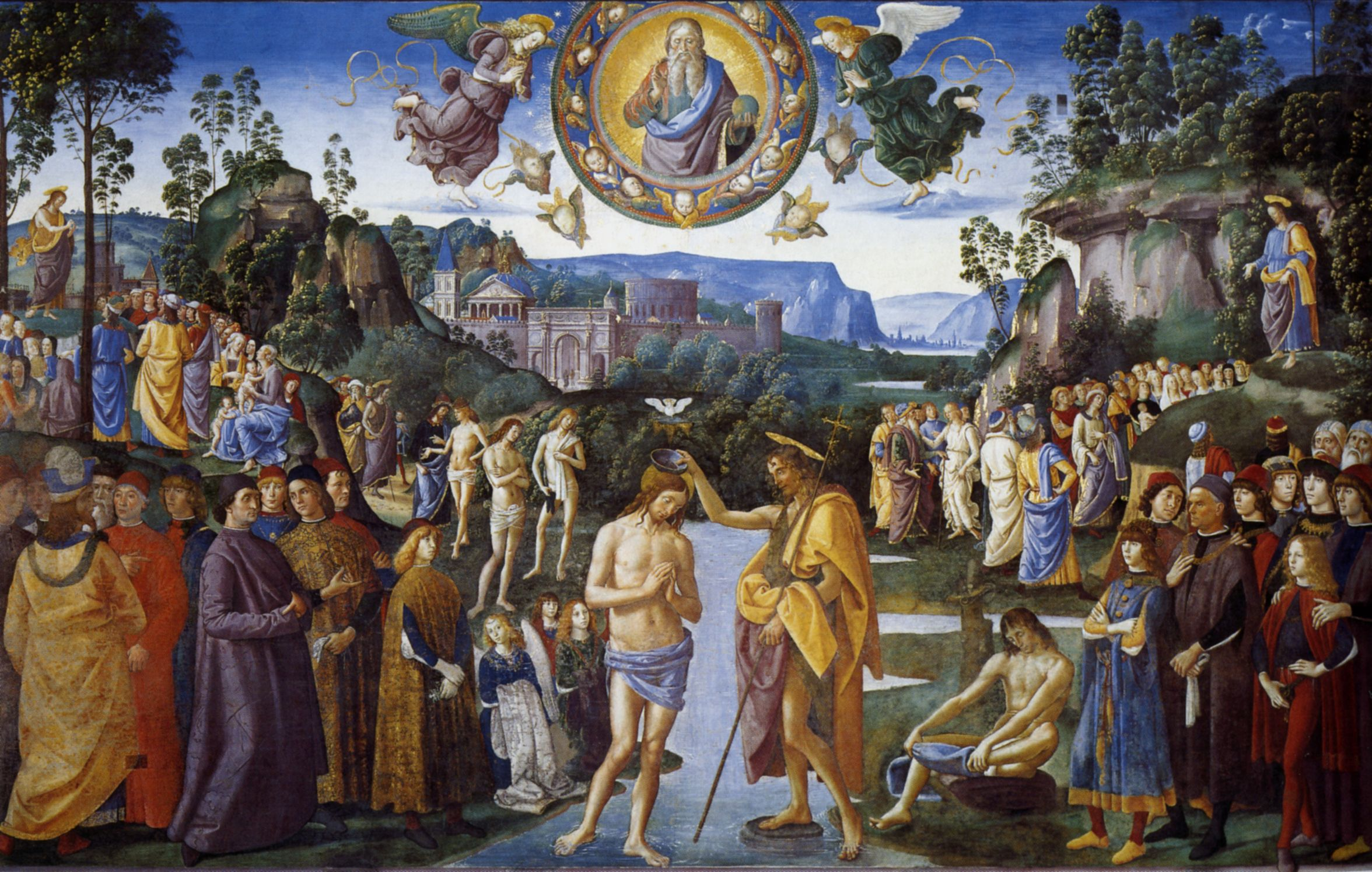
- Artist: Pietro Perugino and his workshop
- Year: c. 1482
- Type: Fresco
- Dimensions: 335 cm × 540 cm (132 in × 210 in)
- Location: Sistine Chapel; Rome

The Baptism of Christ is a fresco by the Italian Renaissance painter Pietro Perugino and his workshop, executed around 1482 and located in the Sistine Chapel, Rome.

== History ==
The commission of the work originated in 1480, when Perugino was decorating a chapel in the Old St. Peter's Basilica in Rome. Pope Sixtus IV was pleased by his work, and decided to commission him also the decoration of the new Chapel he had built in the Vatican Palace. Due to the size of the work, Perugino was later joined by a group of painters from Florence, including Botticelli, Ghirlandaio and others.

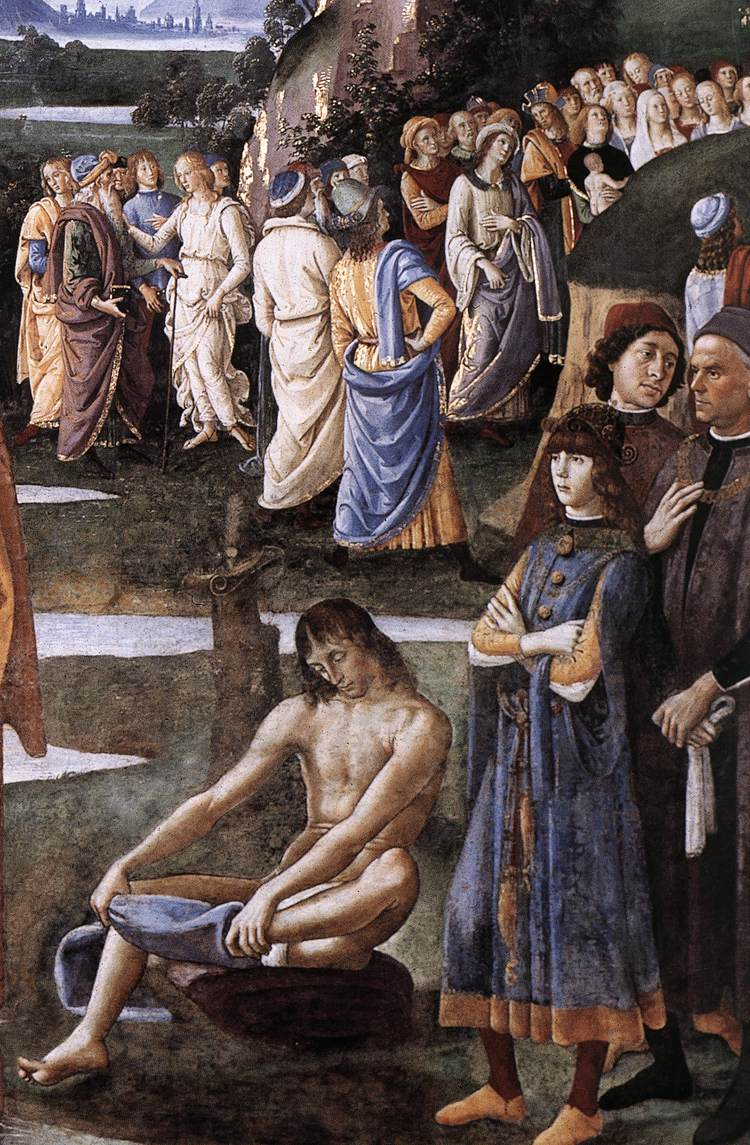
Detail.

Perugino's assistants in the Sistine Chapel included Pinturicchio, Andrea d'Assisi, Rocco Zoppo or, less likely, Lo Spagna or Bartolomeo della Gatta, but the attribution of details to them is disputed.

== Description ==
The fresco of the Baptism of Christ is the first on the wall on the right of the altar, and parallels Moses Leaving to Egypt and the Circumcision of Elezier facing it on the opposite wall, also by Perugino's workshop. The baptism was in fact considered by Augustine and other early Christian writers as a kind of "spiritual circumcision".

The scene follows a symmetrical pattern, typical of Perugino. In the center is the Jordan River flowing towards the observer and reaching the feet of Jesus and John, who is baptizing the former. A dove, symbol of the Holy Spirit, descends from the sky; it is sent by God, represented within a luminous cloud and flanked by flying seraphim and cherubim. The landscape includes a symbolic view of Rome, recognizable by a triumphal arch, the Colosseum and the Pantheon. The thin trees are typical of the Umbrian school and of Perugino in particular.

At the sides are two secondary episodes: the Baptist (left) and Jesus (right) preaching at the crowd. The central scene also features two kneeling angels who are keeping a towel: these are elements inspired by Flemish paintings, and can be seen in works by Hugo van der Goes and in the Portinari Triptych. At the sides, in the foreground, are portraits of contemporary characters, normally rare in Perugino, but in this case spurred by their presence in the works by Ghirlandaio, who was also working in the Sistine Chapel.

The fresco is surmounted by a frieze with the signature OPVS PETRI PERVSINI · CASTRO PLEBIS.

== Sources ==
- Garibaldi, Vittoria (2004). "Perugino". Pittori del Rinascimento. Florence: Scala.
