= Moses Leaving for Egypt =

Fresco by Pietro Perugino and his workshop

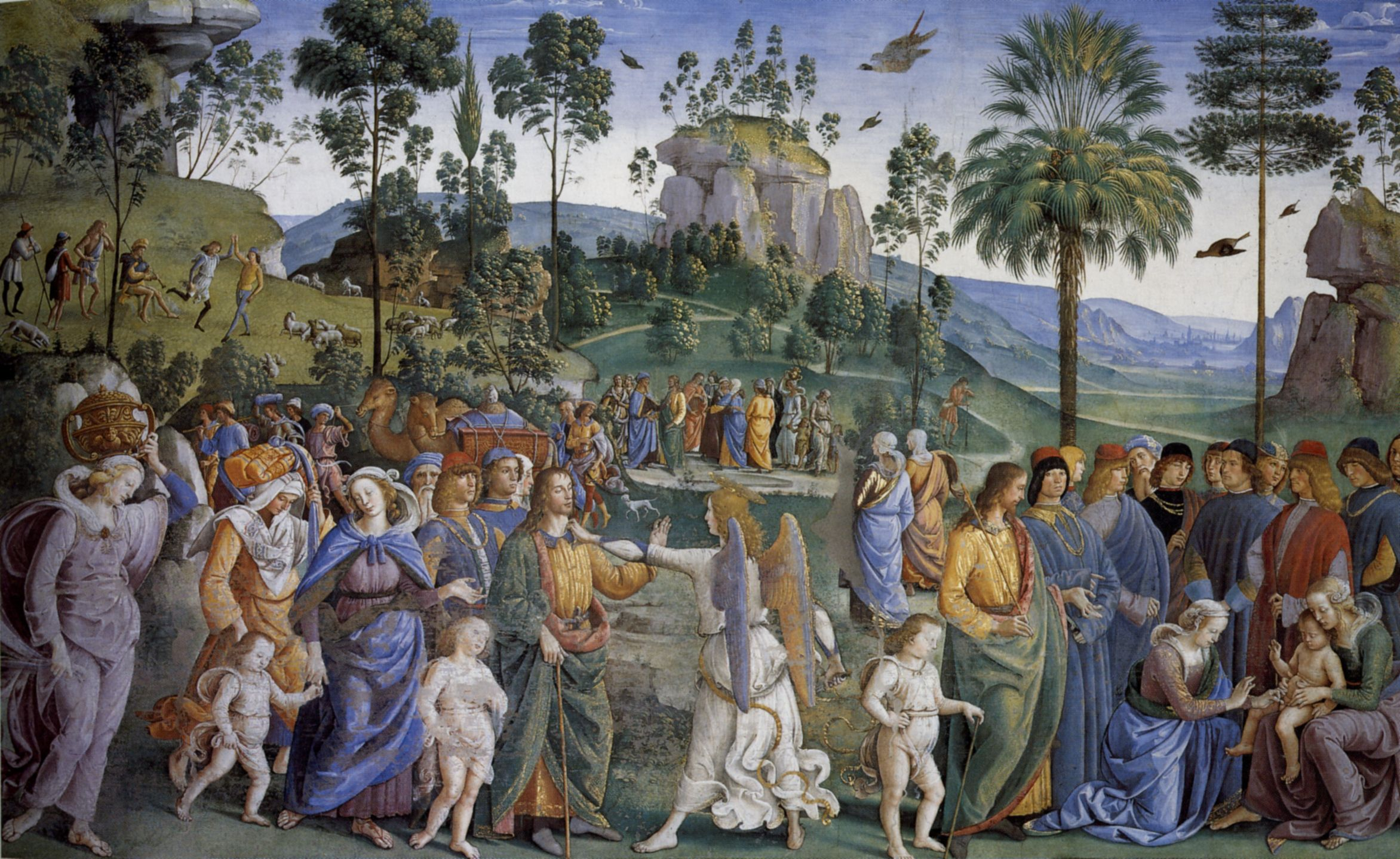
- Artist: Pietro Perugino and his workshop
- Year: c. 1482
- Type: Fresco
- Dimensions: 350 cm × 572 cm (140 in × 225 in)
- Location: Sistine Chapel; Rome

Moses Leaving for Egypt is a fresco by the Italian Renaissance painter Pietro Perugino and his workshop, executed around 1482 and located in the Sistine Chapel, Rome. It depicts a journey by the prophet Moses.

== History ==
The commission of the work originated in 1480, when Perugino was decorating a chapel in the Old St. Peter's Basilica in Rome. Pope Sixtus IV was pleased by his work, and decided to commission him also the decoration of the new Chapel he had built in the Vatican Palace. Due to the size of the work, Perugino was later joined by a group of painters from Florence, including Botticelli, Ghirlandaio and others.

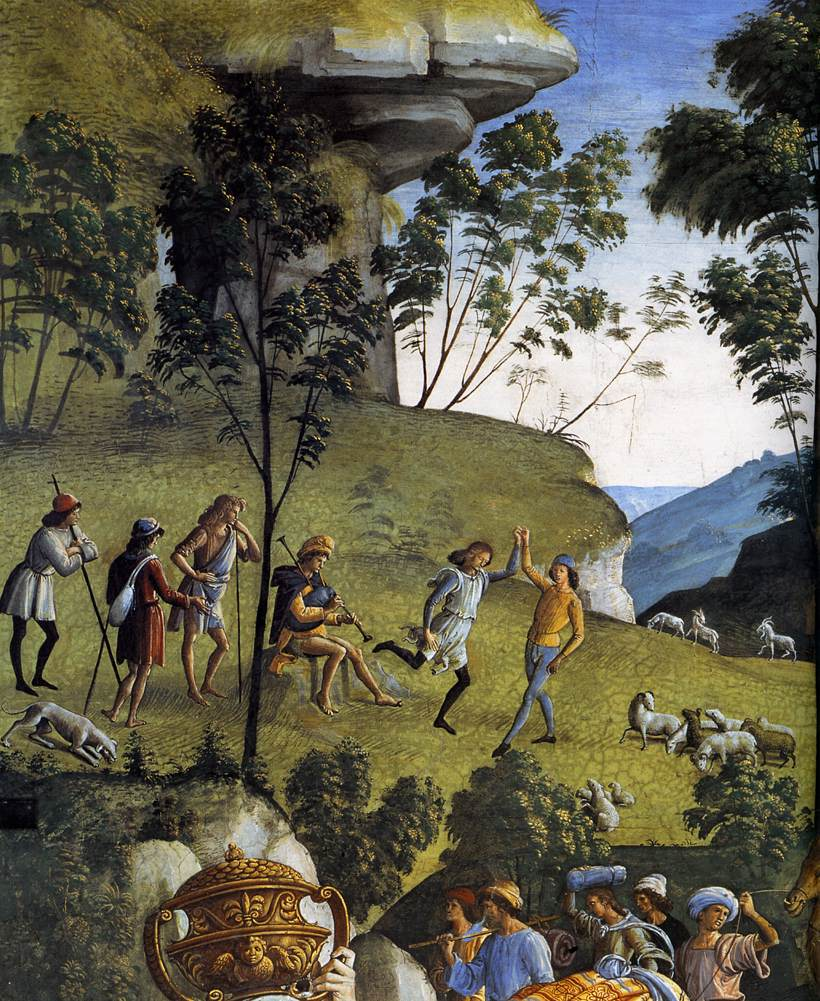
Detail.

Perugino's assistants in the Sistine Chapel included Pinturicchio. Some figures in the fresco were traditionally attributed to him, but this has been disputed by 20th-century art historians. They were painted by Andrea d'Assisi, Rocco Zoppo or, less likely, Lo Spagna or Bartolomeo della Gatta, other Perugino's collaborators of the time.

== Description ==
The fresco depicting the voyage of Moses is the first on the wall right to the altar, and faces the Baptism of Christ on the opposite wall.

The painting shows Moses (dressing in yellow and green as in the other frescoes of the cycle) leaving for Egypt, after he had been exiled from Midian, with Zipporah to his right. In the center, an angel asks him to circumcise his son Eliezer (scene on the right), as a sign of the alliance between Yahweh and the Israelites. The baptism, depicted on the opposite fresco, was in fact considered by several early Christian writers, including Augustine, as a kind of "spiritual circumcision". The ceremony is on the right, and includes Zipporah.

In the right background Moses and Zipporah are greeting Jethro before leaving. Natural elements include the hill landscape in the background, characterized by thin trees (including a palm, a symbol of Christian sacrifice), and the birds: two of them are mating, an allusion to the renovations cycles of the nature. On the left background is a group of shepherds. The dames with flying dresses were a common element of Florentine early Renaissance painting, used also by Ghirlandaio and Botticelli.

== Sources ==
- Garibaldi, Vittoria (2004). "Perugino". Pittori del Rinascimento. Florence: Scala.
