= Andrea di Aloigi =

Italian painter

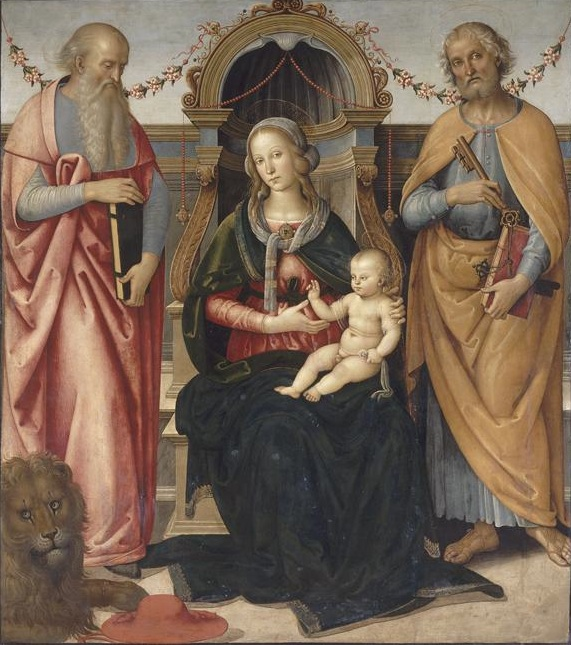
Holy Conversation, attributed to Andrea di Aloigi, now in the Musée Condé.

Andrea di Aloigi (or Alovigi, Aloisi, Aloysii, and Di Luigi; 1480–1521), called L'Ingegno, was an Italian Renaissance painter.

== Life ==
A native of Assisi, he is said by biographer Giorgio Vasari to have been a fellow-pupil with Raphael under Perugino, and to have assisted the latter in the Collegio del Cambio at Perugia, at Assisi, and in the Sistine Chapel. Some of the figures in Perugino's Moses Leaving to Egypt in the chapel have been attributed to him.

Ingegno, Vasari adds, became blind, and received a pension from Pope Sixtus IV. This last statement, as Carl Friedrich von Rumohr pointed out, is an error, as the Pope died in 1484, and Raphael did not enter Perugino's studio until about 1496. Most of his works are in the manner of Fiorenzo di Lorenzo. A Virgin and Child in the National Gallery in London is attributed to him; an inscription on the painting reading "A.A.P." has been taken to mean "Andrea di Aloigi (or possibly Andrea da Assisi) painted this".
