= Isabella Piccini =

Italian artist and nun

- Born: Elisabetta Piccini; 1644; Venice, Republic of Venice
- Died: 29 April 1732; Venice, Republic of Venice
- Known for: Etching; Engraving; Illustration

Isabella Piccini (born Elisabetta Piccini 1644-1732) was an Italian artist and nun. She worked in the mediums of etching, engraving, and illustration.

== Life and work ==
Piccini was born in Venice in 1644. Her father was etcher and engraver Giacomo Piccini. He trained Piccini in engraving and illustration in the style of the great masters such as Peter Paul Rubens and Titian. Piccini became a Franciscan nun in 1666, joining the Convent of Santa Croce. Upon joining, she changed her name to Sister Isabella.

Prominent Italians commissioned works from her, including portraits and religious artworks. Giovanni Antonio Remondini distributed her prints throughout Europe. All income she made was split between her convent and her family.

== Notable collections ==
- Title Page Dittionario Italiano, e Francese Del Signor Veneroni, 1644–1734, Metropolitan Museum of Art

== Gallery ==
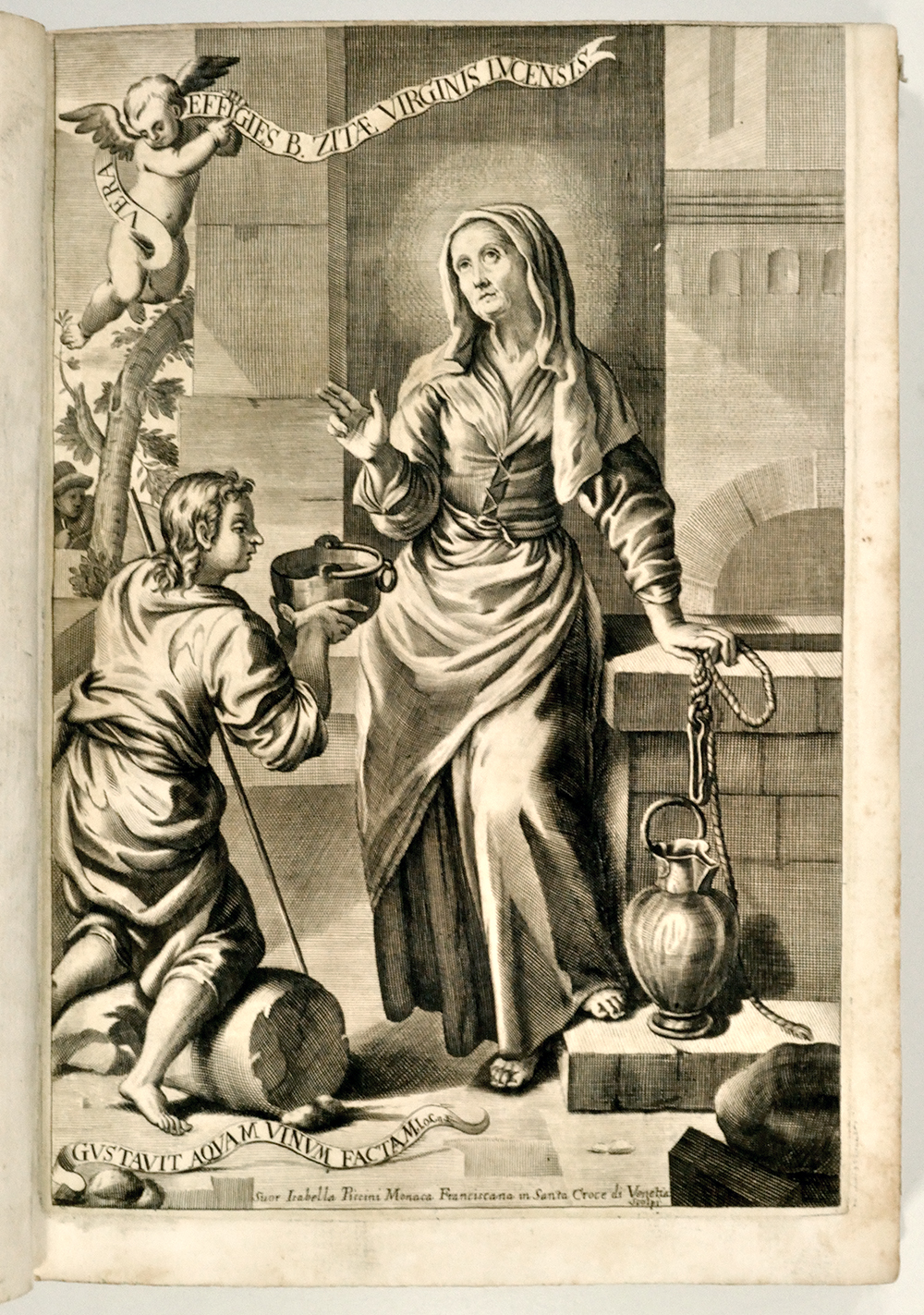
Vita beatae Zitae virginis Lucensis, ex vetustissimo codice m.s. fidelitèr transumpta.Ferrara: Typographia Filoniana, 1688

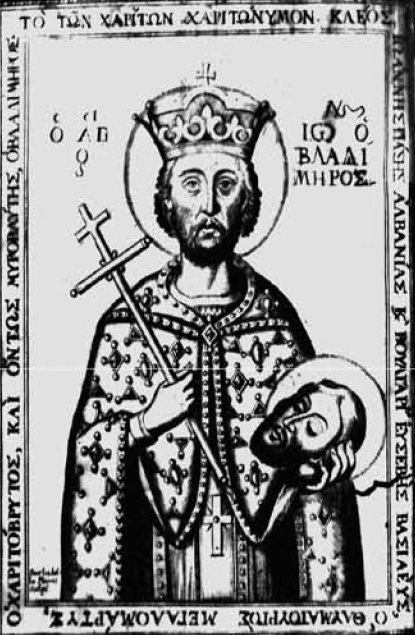
Engraving of Saint Jovan Vladimir, 1690

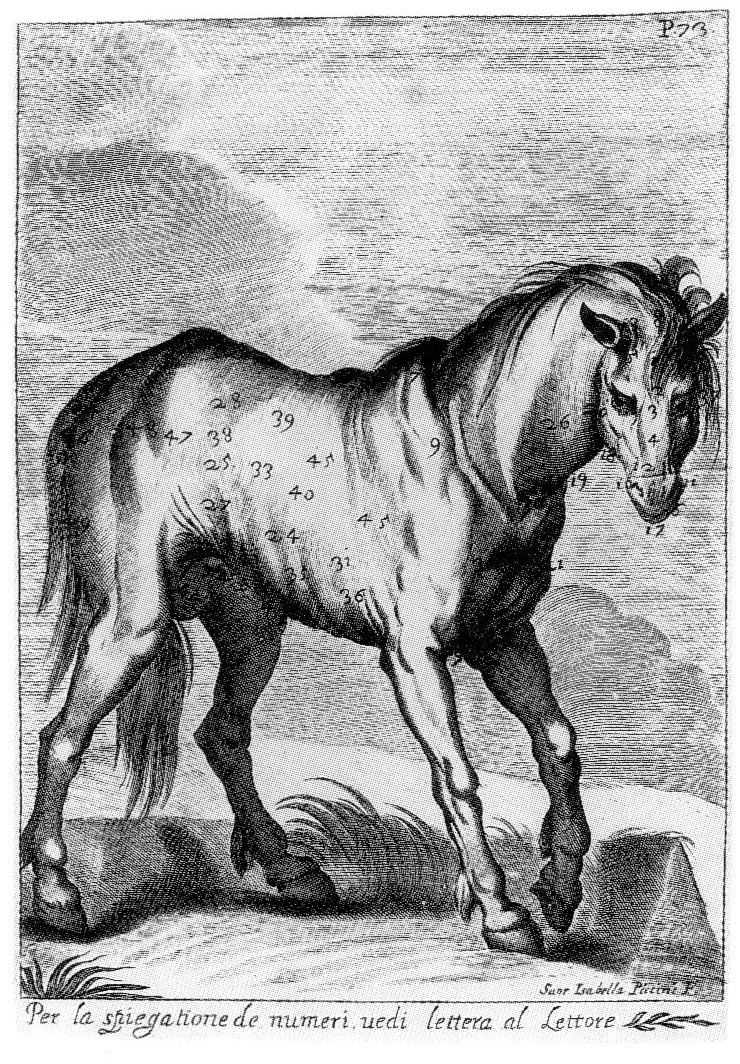
Cavallo imperfetto del Polesine, 1692

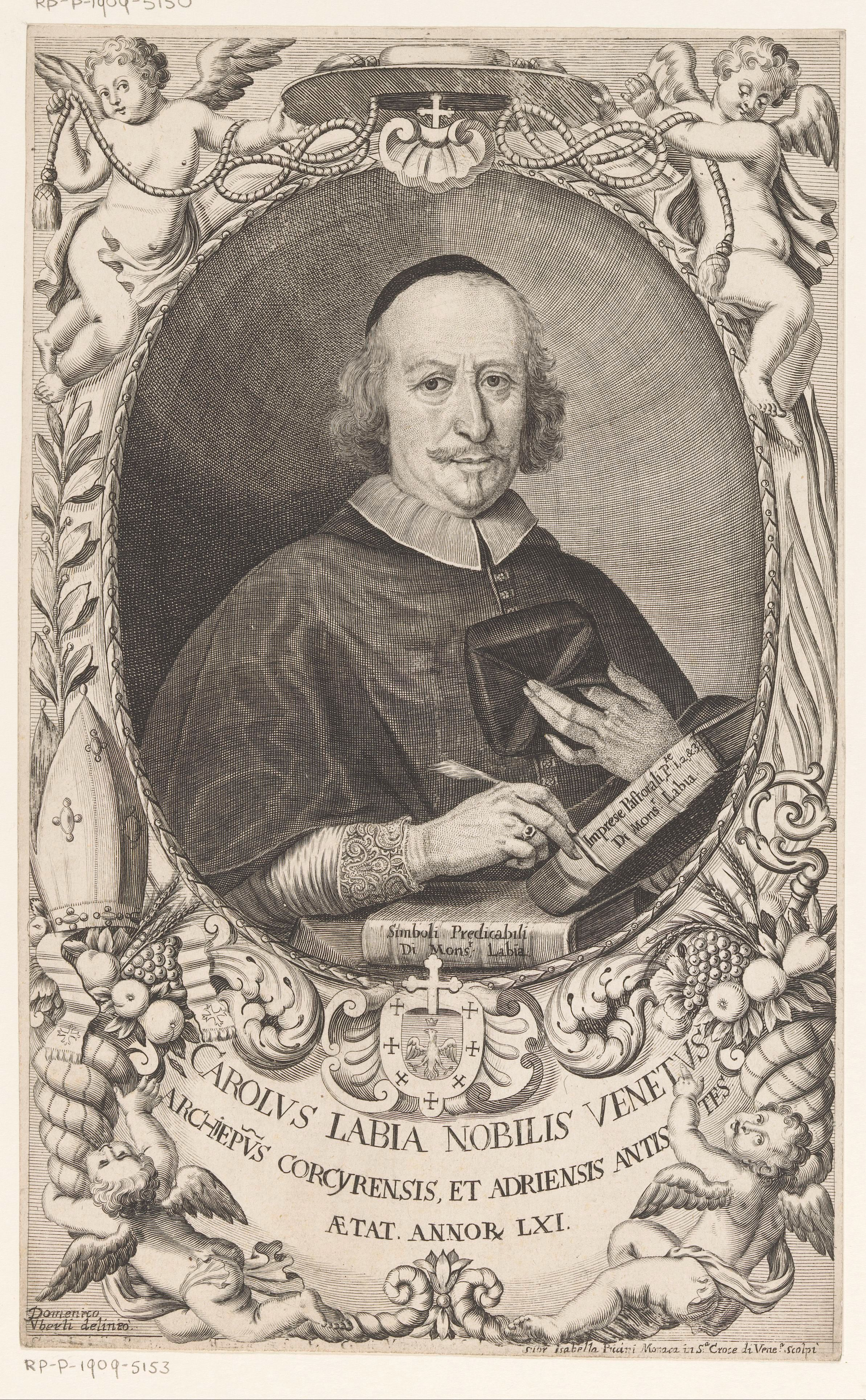
Simboli predicabili : estratti da sacri evangeli che corrono nella quadragesima : delineati con morali, & eruditi discorsi, 1692

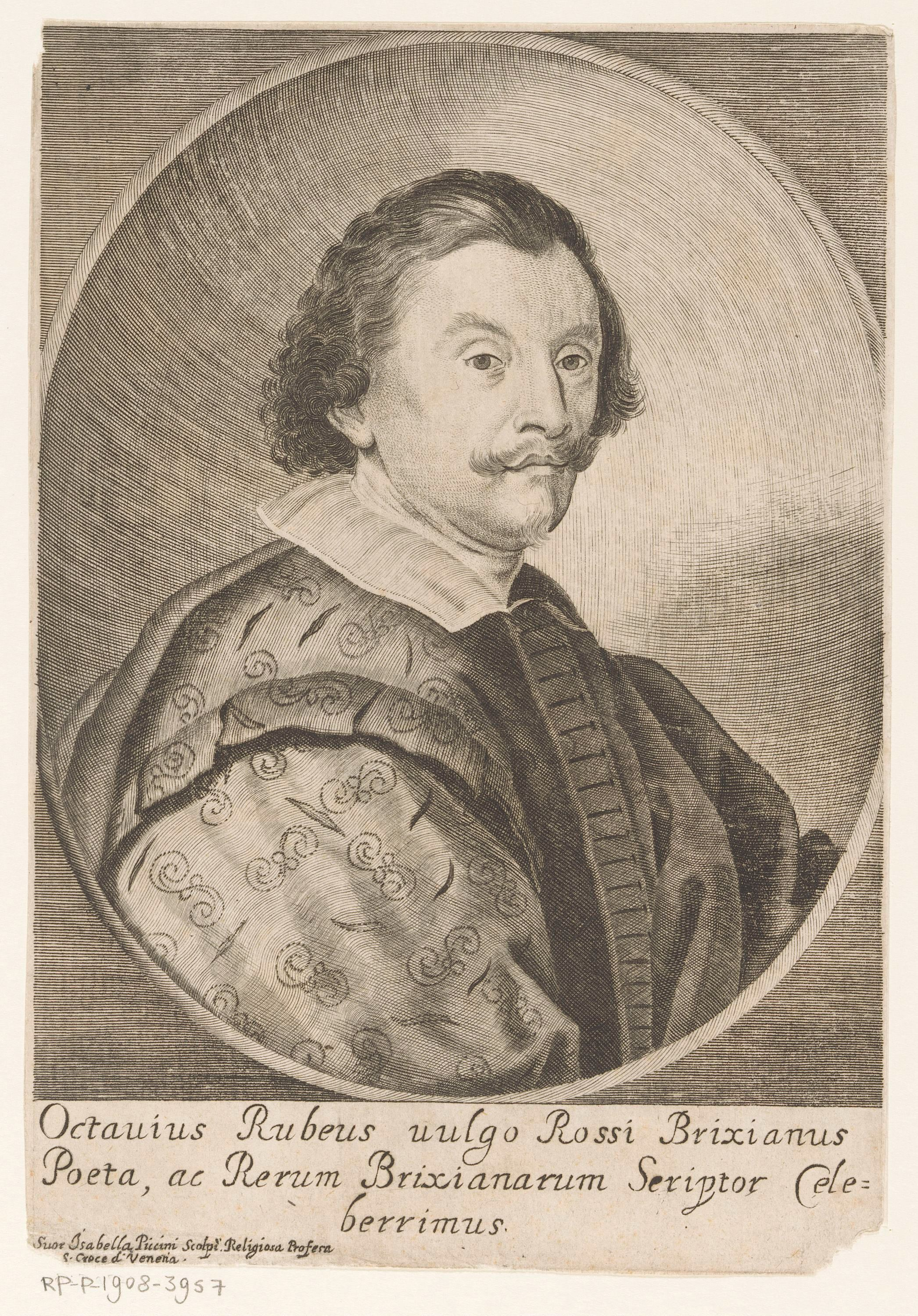
Portrait of poet Ottavio de' Rossi

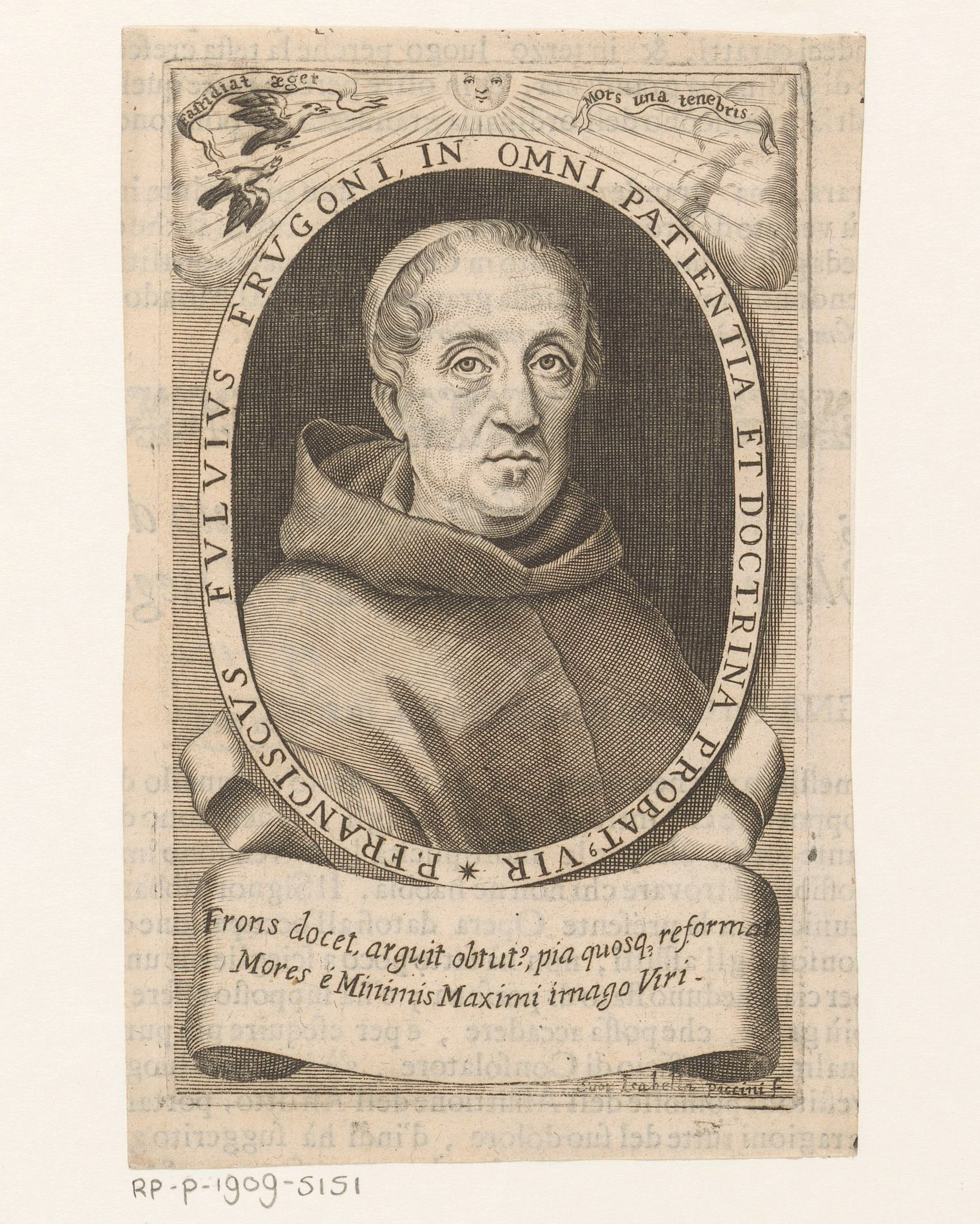
Portrait of writer Francesco Fulvio Frugoni
