= Virgin of the Councillors =

Painting by Lluís Dalmau

Virgin of the Consellers
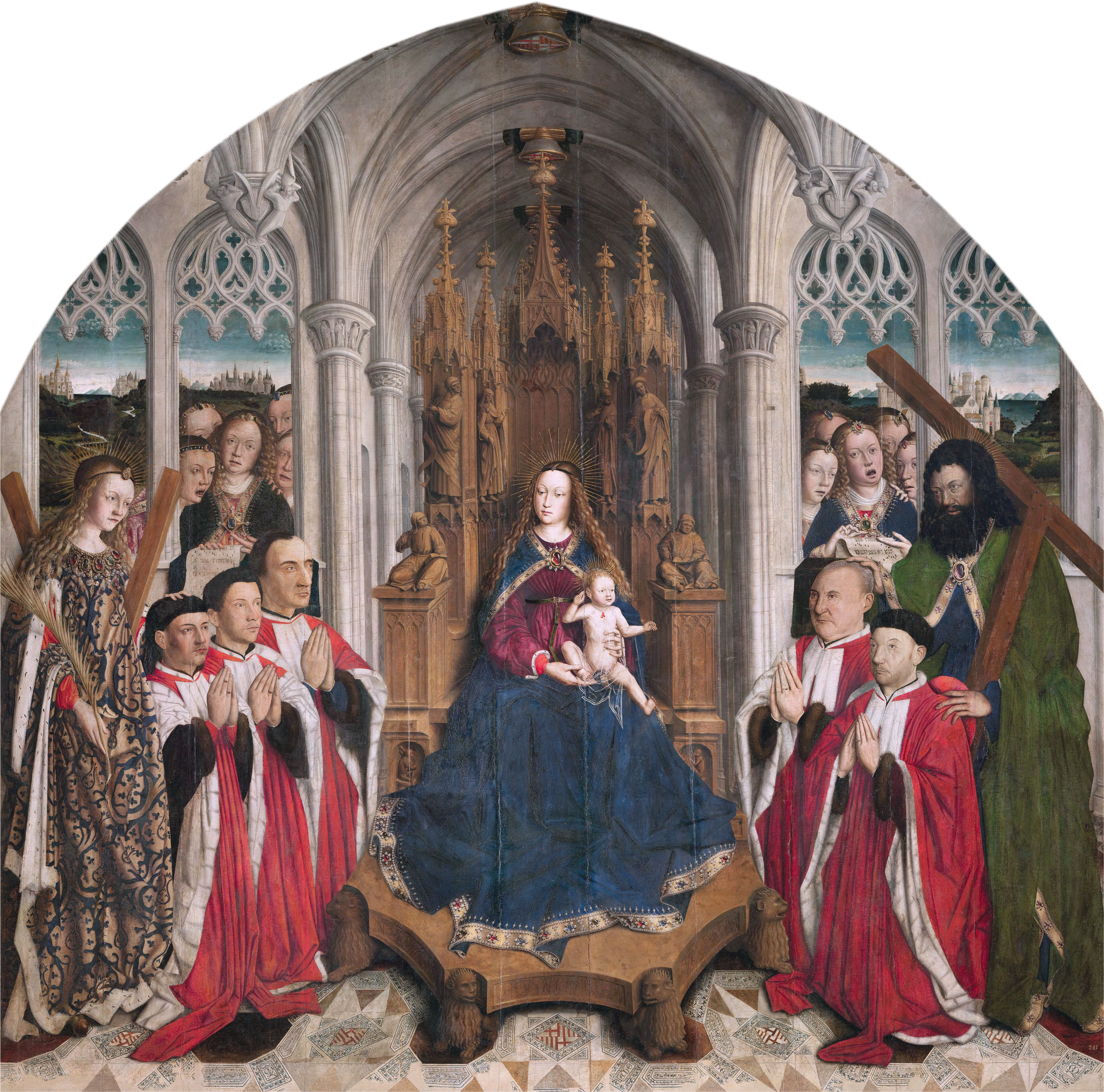
- Artist: Lluís Dalmau
- Year: 1443–1445
- Type: Oil on oak wood
- Dimensions: 316 cm × 312.5 cm (124 in × 123.0 in)
- Location: Museu Nacional d'Art de Catalunya; Barcelona

The Virgin of the Councillors is a panel painting in oils by Lluís Dalmau now in the National Art Museum of Catalonia in Barcelona. It was commissioned in 1443.

== Description ==
The prestige attached to Burgundian courtly culture and the painter Jan van Eyck explain why in 1431 King Alfonso the Magnanimous sent his official painter, the Valencian Lluís Dalmau, to Flanders, to learn the new realist language firsthand. In 1443, Dalmau was commissioned to paint this altarpiece for the chapel of the City Hall. This work was a breakthrough in Catalonia on account of the format, the technique used, as it was painted in oil, and the skilful illusionism of a figurative space in which that year's five councillors, painted from life, are represented on the same scale as the Virgin and the Saints.
