= Jean-Georges Cornélius =

French painter and illustrator

Jean-Georges Cornélius (23 January 1880, Strasbourg - 3 June 1963, Ploubazlanec) was a French painter and illustrator.

== Life ==
Cornélius spent his childhood in Alsace but his family moved to Paris in 1895. There he became a student of Gustave Moreau, then of Luc-Olivier Merson and George Desvallières. He also met his wife there, the American Auria Moses, whom he married in 1917. Having volunteered in 1914, Cornélius became a nurse in a combat unit, where he served as a stretcher-bearer. He was wounded twice during the fighting and lost one of his eyes. This conflict would leave a lasting mark on him, and his style began exhibiting the influences of Symbolism and German Expressionism.

In 1929, he met Georges Bernanos, who became a very close friend. He lived at times in Belgium, the Balearic Islands and Paris, frequently returning to the Breton property in Ploubazlanec that he bought in 1923. At Bernanos's suggestion, he moved his family to Brazil in 1947, then to Rome, before returning permanently to Brittany. His last exhibition was held in Nantes in 1956.

== Works ==
Cornélius produced work that was both mystical and allegorical. Between 1905 and 1913, he produced a large number of medieval-inspired illustrations for magazines and two books, including "La Chanson de Roland" in 1912. He also illustrated the poems of Baudelaire and Oscar Wilde.

He defined himself as a Christian artist who "must not impress art critics but touch the passerby according to the good formula of the Middle Ages. Bring religious feeling and thought within the reach of the simplest in spirit and never show vanity. We need an interior art that acts spiritually towards everyone." Though raised a Lutheran, he converted to Catholicism in 1931 at the Benedictine abbey of Maredsous in Belgium.

Forty-eight paintings and six drawings by Cornélius were donated by the artist's daughter the dancer Marie-Edith Cornélius to the Eucharistic Museum of Hiéron in 2007, following a monographic exhibition of the painter. Some of his works are on display in the museum.

Today his works are held by a dozen museums around France. The Musée de la Révolution française houses his painting Marie-Antoinette and other work is held at the Musée des Beaux-Arts in Pont-Aven, the fr: Musée du Faouët. and museums in Brest, Port Royal, Péronne, Colmar, and Strasbourg.

== Illustrations ==
- Georges Ducrocq, Les matins lumineux, Compositions de Georges Cornélius gravées sur bois par J.C.G.M. Beltrand, Bibliothèque de l'Occident, Avignon, 1909
- The Song of Roland illustrations by J.-G. Cornélius, Henri Laurens Publisher, Paris, 1912
- Oscar Wilde, The Ballad of Reading Gaol, Javal and Bourdeaux, Paris, 1927, compositions engraved on copper in color by Ch. Thévenin
- Charles Baudelaire, Les fleurs du mal, Paris, Éditions Colbert, 1951
