= Lluís Dalmau =

Spanish painter

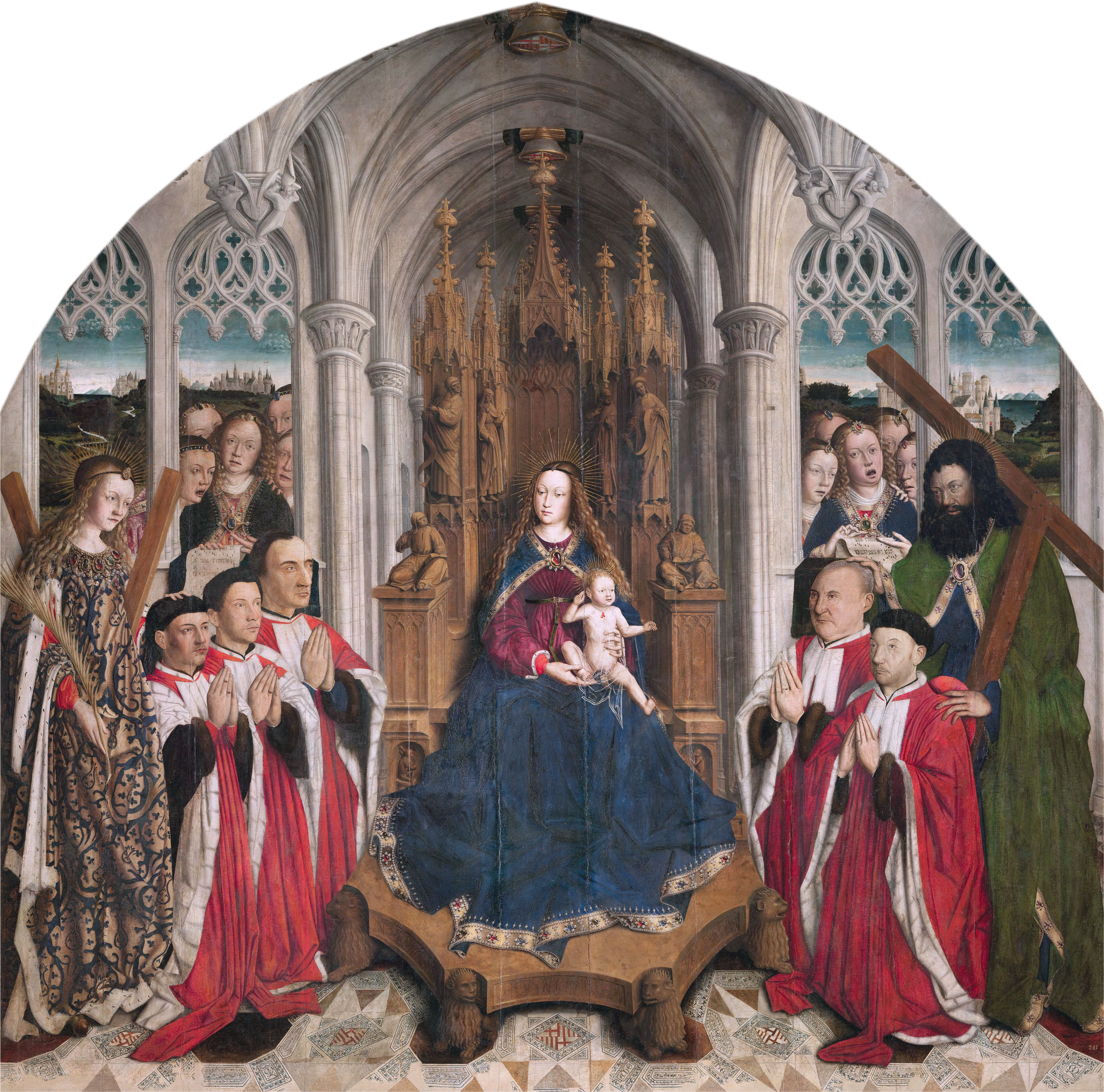
Virgin of the Consellers, ca. 1443–1445, now in the Museu Nacional d'Art de Catalunya

Lluís Dalmau was a Spanish-Valencian painter (fl. 1431 – 1460). He was active in Barcelona from 1428 to 1460 and served the king of Spain in an official capacity. In 1431, King Alfonso V sent him to Flanders to learn the language of realist painting. He made a copy of the Adoration of the Lamb by Hubert and Jan van Eyck; in 1432, this was placed in St Bavo's Cathedral, Ghent. The next year, he had returned to Barcelona. In 1443, Dalmau was commissioned to paint the Virgin of the Consellers altarpiece for the chapel of the City Hall, which he completed in 1445; this is perhaps the only known work of his to survive. In 1445, he also painted a Virgin and Child in the style of Jan van Eyck, which is in the church of San Miguel at Barcelona.

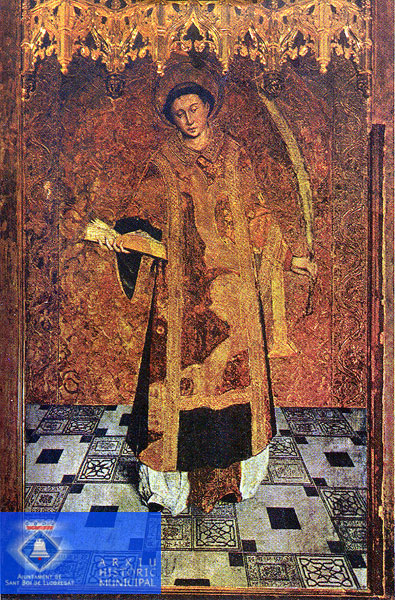
St. Baudilus, now at the Church of St. Baldiri, in Sant Boi de Llobregat, near Barcelona
