= Bartolomeo della Gatta =

Italian painter

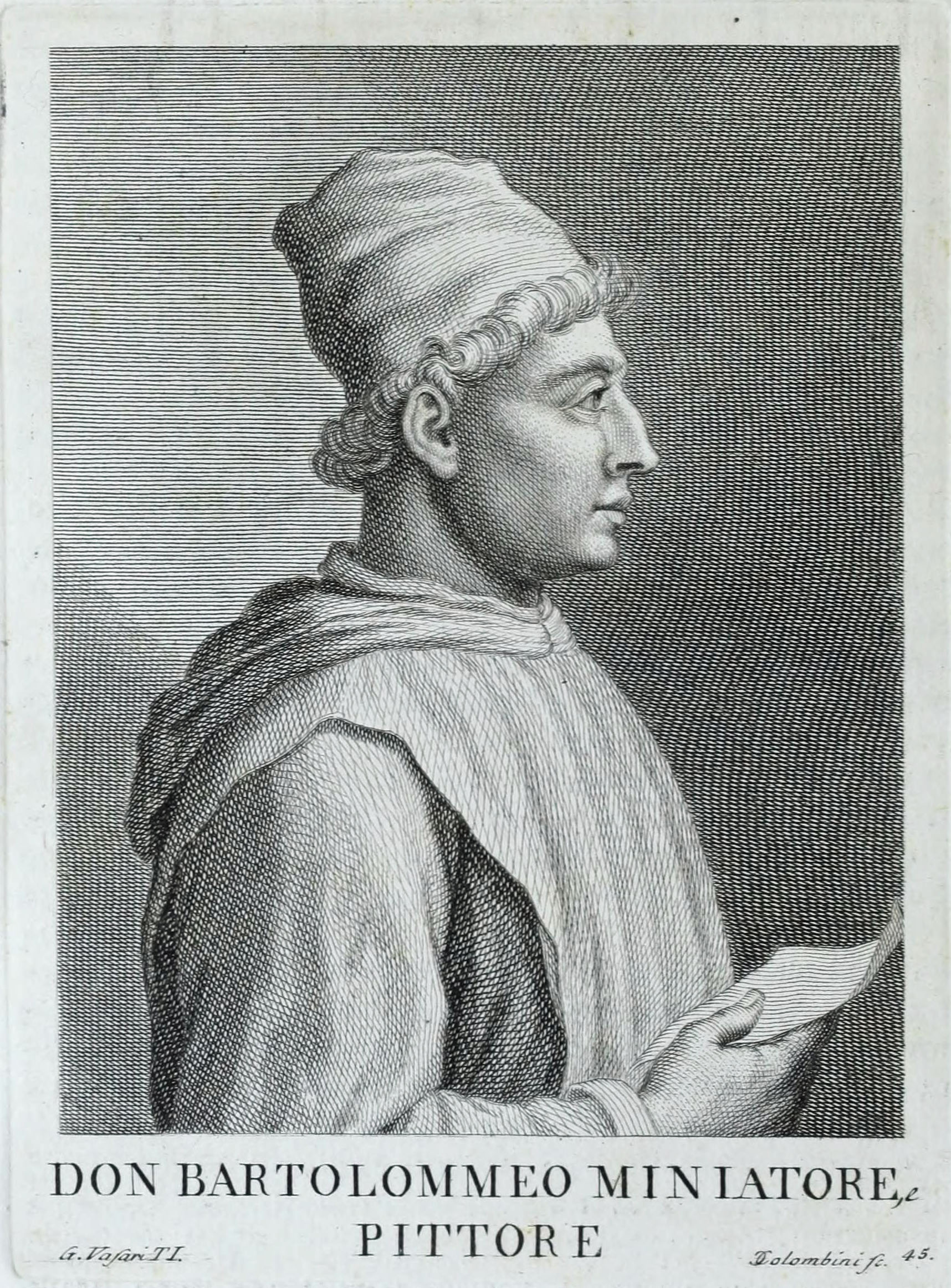
Bartolomeo della Gatta

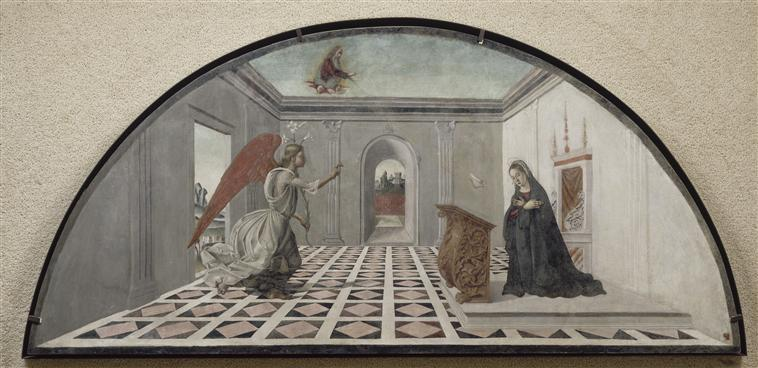
‘The Annunciation’ by Bartolomeo della Gatta

Bartolomeo della Gatta (1448–1502), born Pietro di Antonio Dei, was an Italian (Florentine) painter, illuminator, and architect. He was the son of a goldsmith. He was a colleague of Fra Bartolommeo. In 1468, Bartolomeo became a monk in the Order of Camaldoli, which his brother Nicolo had already entered. Upon taking holy orders, he changed his name to Bartolomeo. About 1481, he was summoned to Rome where he contributed to the cycle of frescos on the walls of the Sistine Chapel. He collaborated with Luca Signorelli. Bartolomeo eventually became abbot of the abbey of San Clemente in Arezzo. He died in 1502 and was buried in the abbey of San Clemente.
