= Judith and Her Maidservant =

Judith and Her Maidservant may refer to:

- Judith and Her Maidservant (Correggio)
- Judith and Her Maidservant (Artemisia Gentileschi, Cannes)
- Judith and Her Maidservant (Artemisia Gentileschi, Detroit)
- Judith and Her Maidservant (Artemisia Gentileschi, Florence)
- Judith and Her Maidservant (Artemisia Gentileschi, Naples)
- Judith and Her Maidservant (Artemisia Gentileschi, Oslo)

== See also ==
- Judith and Holofernes (disambiguation)
