= Judith and Holofernes =

Judith and Holofernes may refer to:

- Judith beheading Holofernes, a biblical episode from the deuterocanonical Book of Judith, often shown in art

Judith and Holofernes or Judith with the Head of Holofernes may also refer to:

== Artworks ==
=== 15th century ===
- Judith and Holofernes (Donatello), a sculpture of c. 1460 by Donatello
- Judith with the Head of Holofernes (Mantegna, Montreal), a painting of c. 1495 by Andrea Mantegna in the Montreal Museum of Fine Arts
- Judith with the Head of Holofernes (Mantegna, Dublin), a painting of c. 1495 by Andrea Mantegna in the National Gallery of Ireland
- Judith with the Head of Holofernes (Mantegna, Washington), a painting of c. 1495/1500 by Andrea Mantegna or a follower in the National Gallery of Art

=== 16th century ===
- Judith with the Head of Holofernes (Titian), a painting of c. 1570 by Titian
- Judith with the Head of Holofernes (Veronese), a painting of c. 1575–1580 by Paolo Veronese
- Judith and Holofernes (studio of Tintoretto), a painting of c. 1577 by the studio of Jacopo Tintoretto
- Judith Beheading Holofernes (Caravaggio), a painting of 1598–1599 by Caravaggio

=== 17th century ===
- Judith with the Head of Holofernes (Cristofano Allori), two paintings of c. 1610–1613 by Cristofano Allori
- Judith with the Head of Holofernes (Saraceni), a painting of 1610–1615 by Carlo Saraceni
- Judith Slaying Holofernes (Artemisia Gentileschi, Naples), a painting of 1612–1613 by Artemisia Gentileschi in the Museo di Capodimonte
- Judith Slaying Holofernes (Artemisia Gentileschi, Florence), a painting of 1620–1621 by Artemisia Gentileschi in the Uffizi
- Judith and Holofernes (Boulogne), a painting of 1626 by Valentin de Boulogne
- Judith and Holofernes (Preti), a painting of 1653–1656 by Mattia Preti

=== Later works ===
- Judith and Holofernes (Goya), a painting of 1819–1823 by Francisco Goya
- Judith I, a painting of 1901 by Gustav Klimt

== Films ==
- Judith of Bethulia, a 1914 American silent film
- Judith and Holofernes (1929 film), a 1929 Italian silent film
- Judith and Holofernes (1959 film), a 1959 French-Italian film

== See also ==
- Judith Holofernes (born 1976), German musician and author
- Judith and Her Maidservant (disambiguation)
- Holofernes (disambiguation)
