= Leda and the Swan (Tintoretto) =

Painting by Jacopo Tintoretto

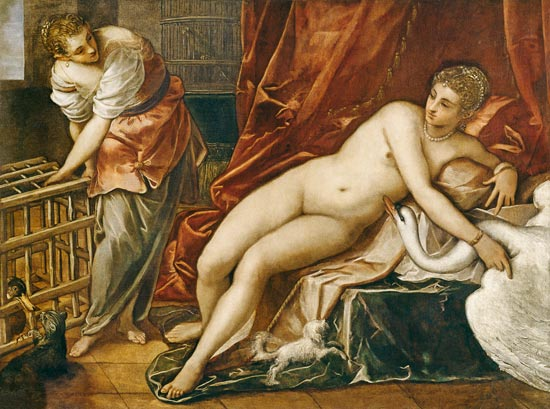
Leda and the Swan (c. 1550–1560) by Tintoretto

Leda and the Swan is an oil painting on canvas of c. 1550–1560 by Jacopo Tintoretto. It depicts the Greek mythological story of Leda and the Swan, the seduction of the princess Leda by the god Zeus, in the form of a swan.

Doubts on its autograph status were quelled by its restorations in 1988 and 1994. Art historians do not agree on its dating, though most now place it in the 1550s, the same period as his Mars and Venus Surprised by Vulcan (Alte Pinakothek) and Joseph and Potiphar's Wife (Museo del Prado). Judith and Holofernes (Prado) was also previously dated to that decade but has now been downgraded to a studio work.

In the late 18th century the work was in the Orleans Collection in Paris, before being purchased in London by the Duke of Bridgewater, then in 1857 by Paul Norton, and finally being donated by Arturo De Noè Walker in 1895 to its present owner, the Uffizi in Florence.

Another version, from Alessandro Contini-Bonacossi's collection, is also owned by the Uffizi. In this version, the servant was later cut off – it was probably the prototype for the Orleans Collection work.
