= Judith with the Head of Holofernes (Titian) =

Painting by Titian

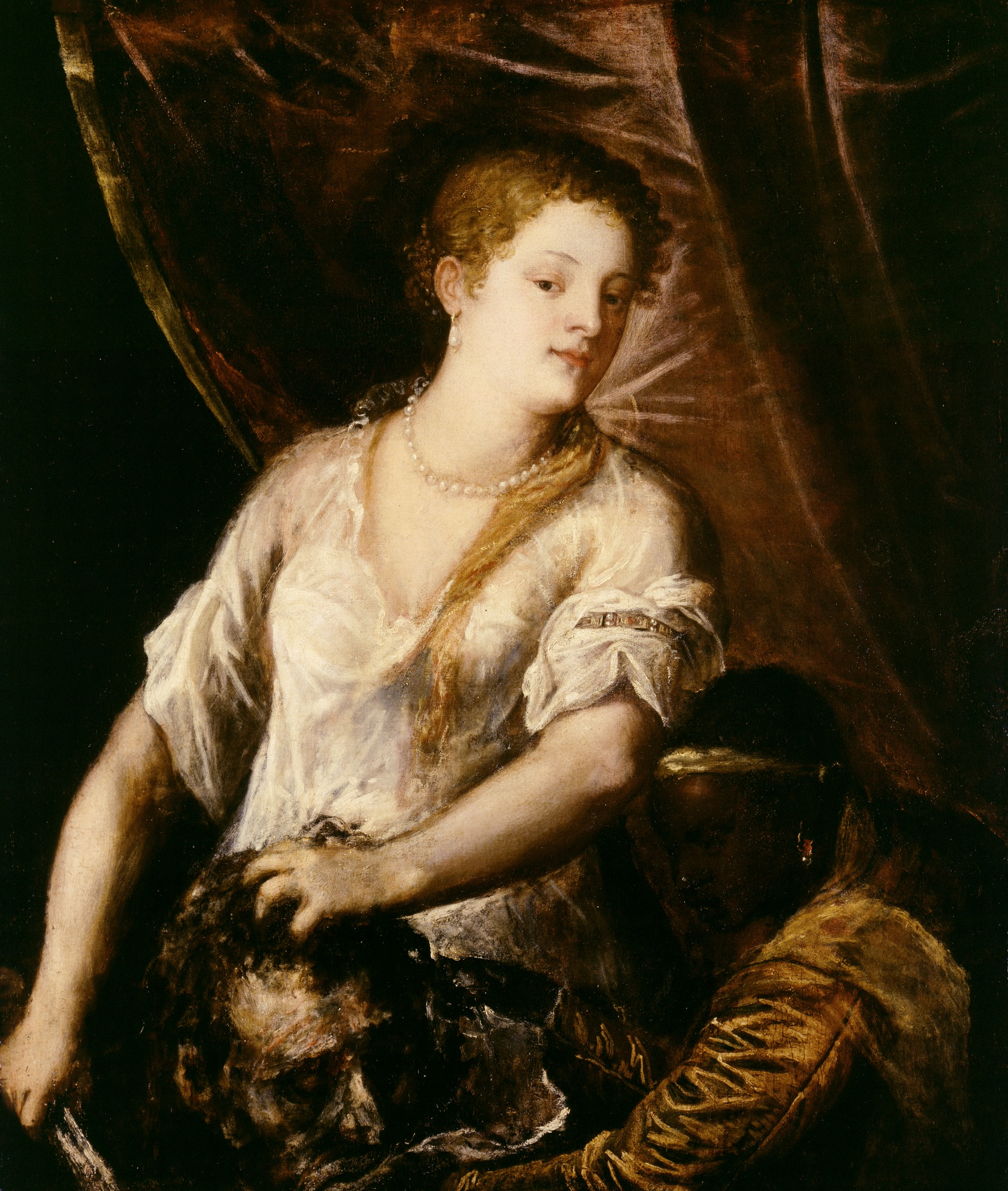
- Artist: Titian
- Year: c. 1570
- Medium: Oil on canvas
- Dimensions: 113 cm × 95.3 cm (44 in × 37.5 in)
- Location: Detroit Institute of Arts; Detroit

Judith with the Head of Holofernes is an oil on canvas painting by Titian, made c. 1570,. It is held in the Detroit Institute of Arts.

== Subject ==
Judith, a beautiful and pious widow of the Tribe of Simeon, executes a plan to deliver Bethulia from the Assyrian general Holofernes. Wearing her rich attire, and accompanied by her maid, who carries a bag of provisions, she goes to the hostile camp, where she is at once conducted to the general, whose suspicions are disarmed by the tales she invents. After four days Holofernes, smitten with her charms, at the close of a sumptuous entertainment invites her to remain within his tent over night. No sooner is he overcome with sleep than Judith, seizing his sword, strikes off his head and gives it to her maid; both now leave the camp (as they had previously been accustomed to do, ostensibly for prayer) and return to Bethulia, where the trophy is displayed amid rejoicings and thanksgivings.

== History ==
This is the only known depiction of Judith beheading Holofernes by Titian. It has been universally accepted as an autograph (that is, painted entirely by Titian) since its rediscovery by Tancred Borenius in 1922.

== Provenance ==
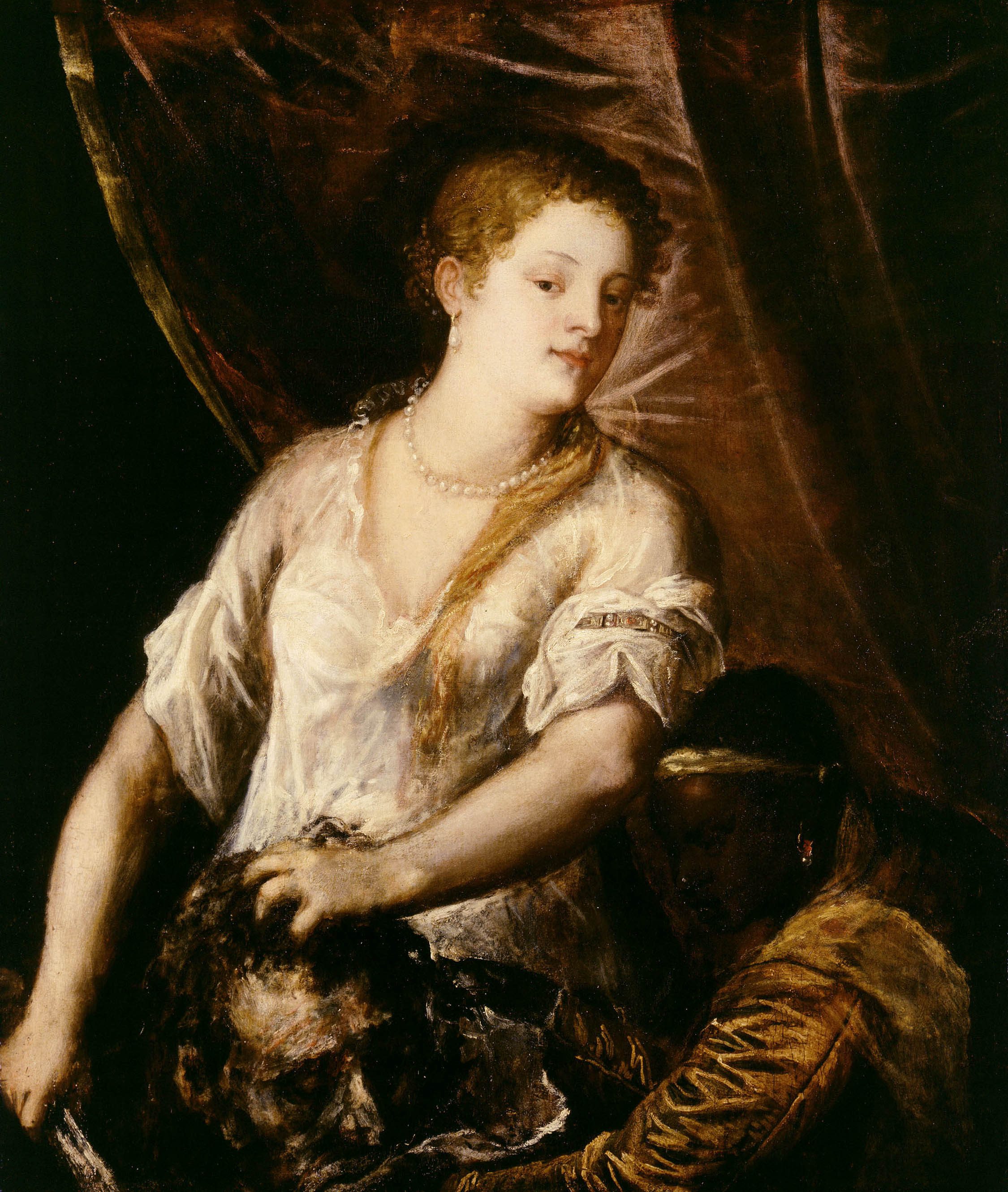
Judith (c. 1570)

The picture was probably first recorded in the collection of the Florentine aristocrat and art collector Marchese Gerini by Francesco Bocchi and Giovanni Cinelli in 1677. It was purchased by Esdel B. Ford from a private collection in New York City in 1935, and gifted to the Detroit Institute of Arts later that year.

== See also ==
- List of works by Titian

== Sources ==
- Biadene, Susanna, ed. (1990). "Judith". Translated by Hecker, Sharon; Rylands, Philip; Wilkins, Elizabeth. In Titian: Prince of Painters. Italy: Prestel. p. 352.
- Charles, Robert Henry (1911). "Judith, Book of". In Chisholm, Hugh (ed.). Encyclopædia Britannica. Vol. 15 (11th ed.). Cambridge University Press. pp. 542–43.
- "Canvas of Venetian Master Hidden Away for Centuries". The Detroit Free Press. 12 April 1935. p. 1.
- "Rare Titian Goes to Detroit Museum". The New York Times. 14 April 1935. p. 1.
