= Judith and Her Maidservant (Artemisia Gentileschi, Cannes) =

Painting by Artemisia Gentileschi

Judith and her Maidservant
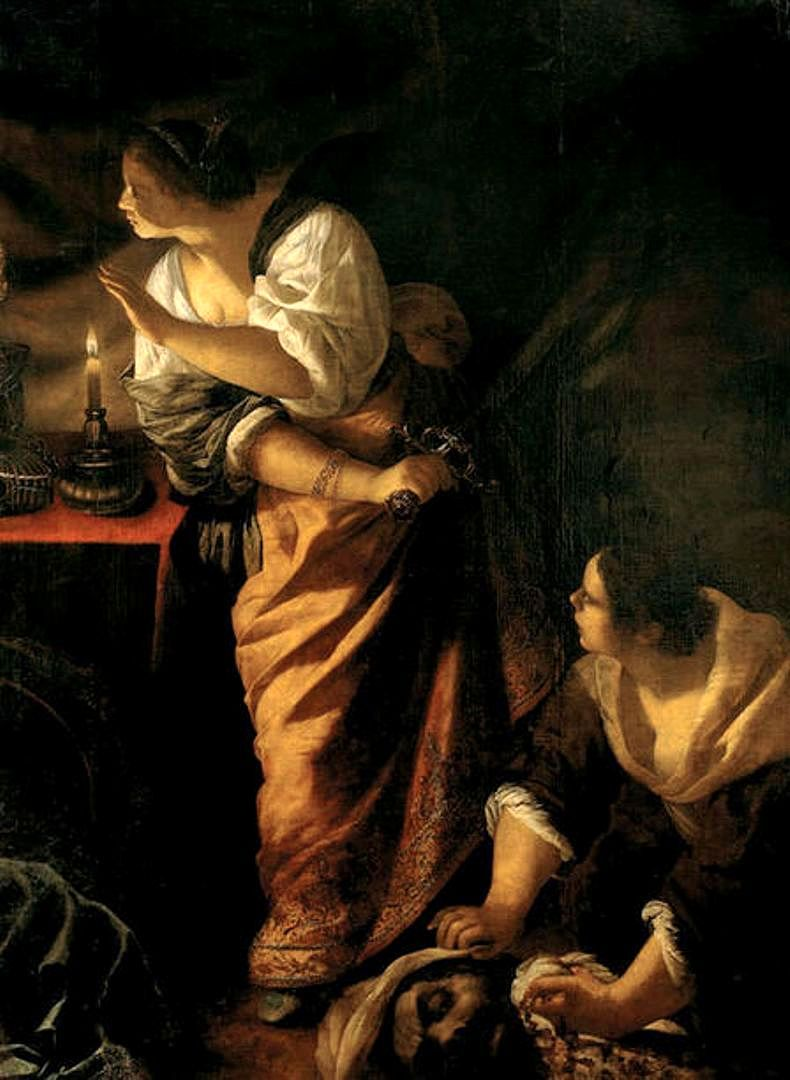
- Artist: Artemisia Gentileschi
- Year: c. 1645
- Medium: Oil on canvas
- Dimensions: 235 cm × 172 cm (93 in × 68 in)
- Location: Musée de la Castre, Cannes

Judith and Her Maidservant is a painting by the Italian baroque artist Artemisia Gentileschi. Executed sometime between 1640 and 1645, it hangs in the Musée de la Castre in Cannes.

== Subject Matter ==
The story comes from the deuterocanonical Book of Judith, in which Judith seduces and then beheads the general Holofernes. The precise moment painted takes place after the murder when her maidservant places the severed head in a bag, while Judith checks around her. It is the second of three paintings that Gentileschi painted of the same moment, all using a similar design. The first, painted between 1623 and 1625, hangs in the Detroit Institute of Arts, while the third, painted later in the 1640s, now hangs in the Museo di Capodimonte in Naples.

== Provenance ==
Records indicate that it was gifted to the museum in 1933 by Madame Derive, but curators have been unable to trace her history. A major restoration was completed in 1973, and additional restoration was undertaken when it was brought out of storage for exhibition in Cannes in 2021.

== See also ==
- List of works by Artemisia Gentileschi

== Sources ==
- Bissell, R. Ward (1999). Artemisia Gentileschi and the Authority of Art : Critical Reading and Catalogue Raisonné. University Park, Pa.: Pennsylvania State University Press. ISBN 9780271017877.
- Locker, Jesse (2015). Artemisia Gentileschi : the Language of Painting. New Haven: Yale University Press. ISBN 9780300185119.
