= Giovanni Cinelli Calvoli =

Italian physician and bibliographer

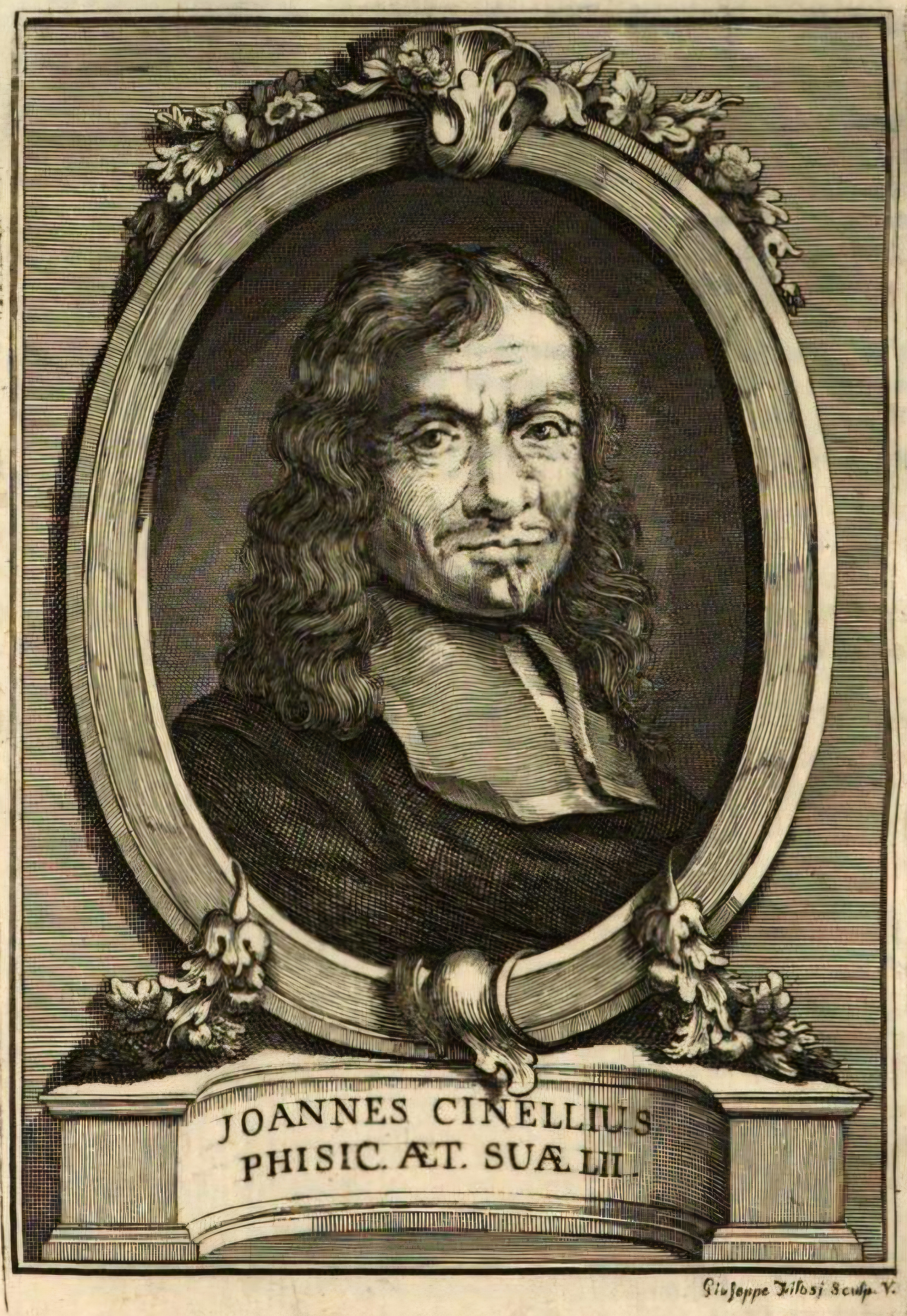
- Engraved portrait of Giovanni Cinelli Calvoli by Giuseppe Filosi after Pietro Dandini, 1734
- Born: February 26, 1626; Florence, Grand Duchy of Tuscany
- Died: 3 April 1706 (aged 80); Loreto, Papal States
- Occupations: Physician; Bibliographer; Literary historian
- Parent(s): Domenico Cinelli Calvoli and Francesca Cinelli Calvoli (née Lazzeri)

Academic background
- Education: University of Pisa
- Doctoral advisor: Alessandro Marsili

Academic work
- Era: Seicento
- Discipline: History of Literature
- Notable works: Biblioteca Volante, the first bibliography of Italian literature

Giovanni Cinelli Calvoli (26 February 1626 – 3 April 1706) was an Italian physician and bibliographer of the Seicento.

== Biography ==
Giovanni Cinelli Calvoli was born in Florence in 1625 and educated at Pisa, where he was a pupil of Torricelli. In Pisa he befriended the scholar Giovanni Battista Ricciardi and met the painter and poet Salvator Rosa. Having graduated in medicine and philosophy he married and returned to Florence in 1651, but five years later went to the island of Elba where his wife died, leaving four children. He returned to Florence and its neighbourhood, and remarried.

He became the intimate friend of Magliabechi, who entrusted him with a key of the Grand Ducal Library so that he could make use of the books at any time. Cinelli was particularly interested in the literary history of Tuscany, and he conceived the idea of a bibliographical account of rare pamphlets and fugitive pieces. To this he gave the name of Biblioteca Volante, and it appeared at irregular intervals whenever he could find the money, for the cost of printing.

The first and second parts came out at Florence in 1677, the third and fourth at Naples in 1682 and 1685, the fifth at Parma in 1686, the sixth at Rome in 1689, the seventh and eighth at Parma, the ninth at Venice in 1700, the tenth at Venice in 1705, the eleventh at Parma in 1695, the twelfth and thirteenth at Rome in 1697, and the fourteenth at Rome in 1699. The fifteenth was so incorrectly printed at Padua in 1703 that most of the copies were burned by the author. The sixteenth appeared in 1706, and was the last issued by Cinelli, though the work was continued by others.

In the fourth part of this serial Cinelli intervened in the controversy between Bernardino Ramazzini and the physician of the Grand Duke Giovanni Andrea Moneglia, following the death after childbirth of the Marchesa Maria Maddalena Martellini Bagnesi. The merits of the quarrel are of little moment now, but it had an unlucky influence upon Cinelli. He was of a passionate and sarcastic disposition, and the violence of his attacks upon the physician of the Grand Duke led to the suppression of that number of the Biblioteca Volante and the imprisonment of its author, who was not released without an apology and a promise not to return to the subject. This was more than Cinelli could endure, and he went into voluntary exile for the pleasure of publishing a justification in which Moneglia was severely criticised. This tract, professedly printed at Cracow, was really issued at Venice in 1683.

In 1677 by Cinelli published an expanded version of Francesco Bocchi’s Le bellezze della città di Fiorenza. Cinelli erroneously thought he was aimed at in a satire by Menzini, and on this he resolved to write an autobiography in which he smote all his enemies, real and supposed. Cinelli died at Loreto, Marche, on 3 April 1706, at the age of 81. Cinelli Calvoli edited the first edition of Lorenzo Lippi's mock-heroic poem Il Malmantile racquistato (1677). He left unpublished an history of Tuscan literature (La Toscana Letterata ovvero Istoria degli Scrittori Toscani, Biblioteca Nazionale Centrale di Firenze, Ms. Magl. IX, 66-68).

== Bibliography ==
- Benzoni, Gino (1981). "Cinelli Calvoli, Giovanni". Dizionario Biografico degli Italiani (in Italian). Vol. 25: Chinzer–Cirni. Rome: Istituto dell'Enciclopedia Italiana. ISBN 978-88-12-00032-6.
- Tosin, Luca (2012). "Giovanni Cinelli Calvoli". Nuova Informazione Bibliografica. 1 (1): 161–182. doi:10.1448/36816.
