= Judith and Her Maidservant (Artemisia Gentileschi, Florence) =

Painting by Artemisia Gentileschi

- Judith
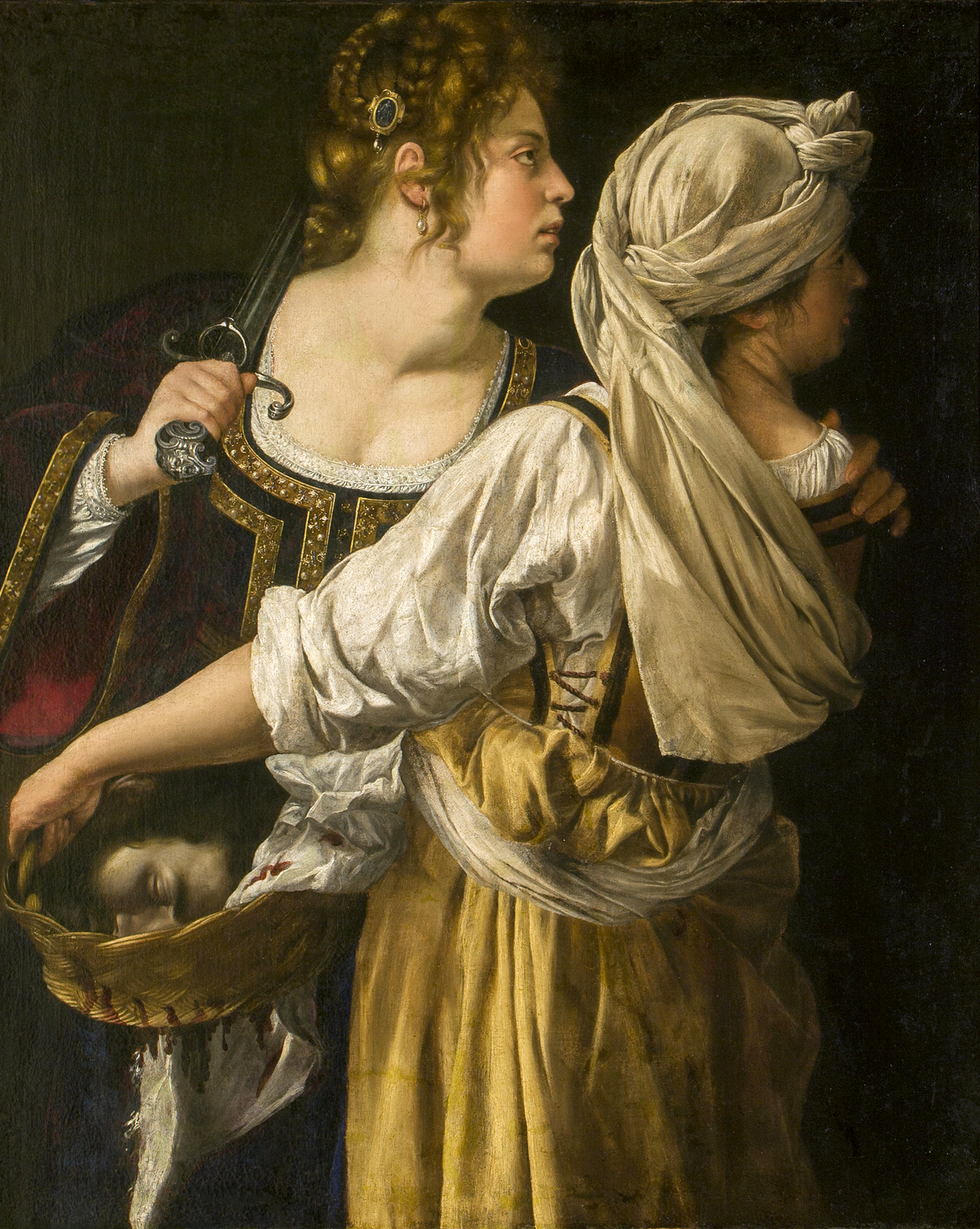
- Year: 1610s
- Medium: oil paint, canvas
- Dimensions: 114 cm (45 in) × 93.5 cm (36.8 in)
- Location: Galleria Palatina, Italy; 43°45′54″N 11°15′00″E

Judith and her Maidservant is a c. 1615 painting by the Italian baroque artist Artemisia Gentileschi. The painting depicts Judith and her maidservant leaving the scene where they have just beheaded general Holofernes, whose head is in the basket carried by the maidservant. It hangs in the Pitti Palace, Florence.

== Description ==
The painting depicts the moments after the biblical heroine Judith has assassinated the general Holofernes, and is fleeing his tent with her servant Abra.

The subject is one that Gentileschi portrayed several times during her career. She depicts the moment Judith assassinated Holofernes in two versions of the same scene: Judith Slaying Holofernes (Naples) and Judith Slaying Holofernes (Florence).

This portrayal of the moments following the assassination is based on an earlier work by the artist's father:

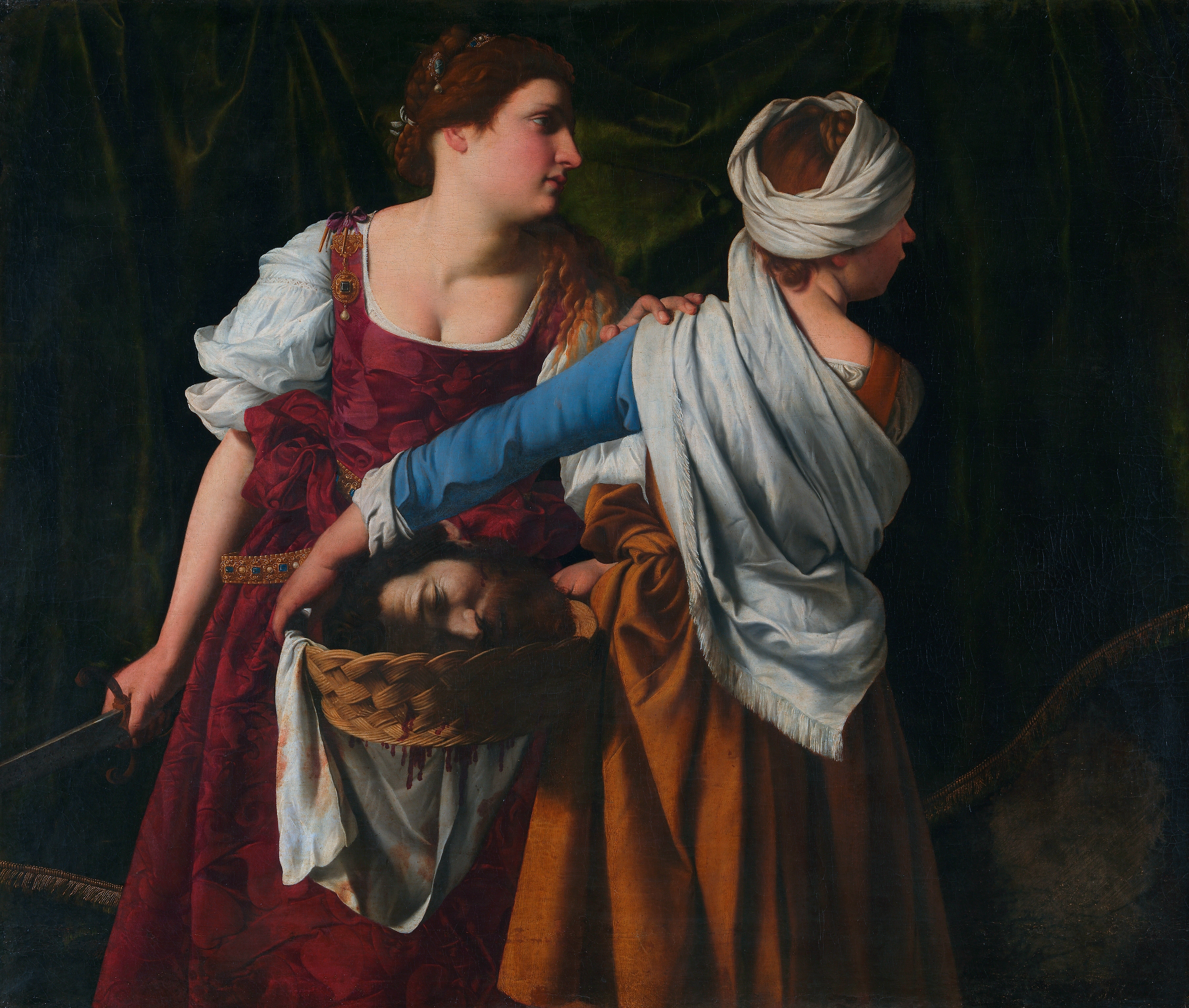
Judith and her maidservant with the head of Holofernes, c. 1608, by Orazio Gentileschi

The dark setting of the scene is brightened by the red and gold tones in the fabrics - colors which Gentileschi used frequently during her time in Florence. The use of deep colors and rich textures is characteristic of the Baroque period to which her work belongs.

Her use of diagonal lines guides the viewer from the faces of the women to the head of Holofernes in the basket. She also uses intense contrast between dark and light to create three-dimensional volume.

The viewer is reminded of the violence which preceded this moment by the screaming head depicted on the pommel of the sword, thought to be a mythological figure such as Medusa. The presence of fresh blood dripping from the basket the maidservant is carrying, which shows Holofernes's head in full view, also invokes the violence of the scene the two figures are leaving. The intense depiction of gore is also characteristic of Baroque painting, which, unlike previous artistic movements, did not shy away from bloody depictions of biblical scenes.

== Subject matter ==
The story of Judith and Holofernes is taken from the Book of Judith, a deuterocanonical book of the Bible that is included in the Septuagint, Catholic, and Eastern Orthodox Christian Old Testament of the Bible, but excluded from the Hebrew canon and assigned by Protestants to the Biblical apocrypha. In the story, Holofernes, an Assyrian general, has come to besiege the biblical city of Bethulia, Judith's home. Judith, an Israelite widow, sneaks into Holofernes's tent when he is drunk and asleep, and she beheads him with the help of her maidservant, Abra, in order to save her city. Judith and Abra carry Holofernes's head away in a basket, as depicted in the painting.

Judith's maidservant Abra is often depicted in paintings and representations as an elderly woman, but in Gentileschi's depictions of the slaying of Holofernes, she is closer to the age of Judith.

== History ==
The painting was first documented as being in the collection of Grand Duchess Maria Maddalena of Austria, as part of a 1638 inventory. The painting has been altered several times and was likely significantly larger when first created, particularly to the top and the left side of the canvas. The condition of the paint has also been adversely affected by historic conservation efforts.

The work now hangs in the Galleria Palatina at the Pitta Palace in Florence, Italy.

== See also ==
- List of works by Artemisia Gentileschi
- Women artists of the Baroque Era
- Baroque painting
