= Filippo Titi =

Italian Roman Catholic Protonotary apostolic

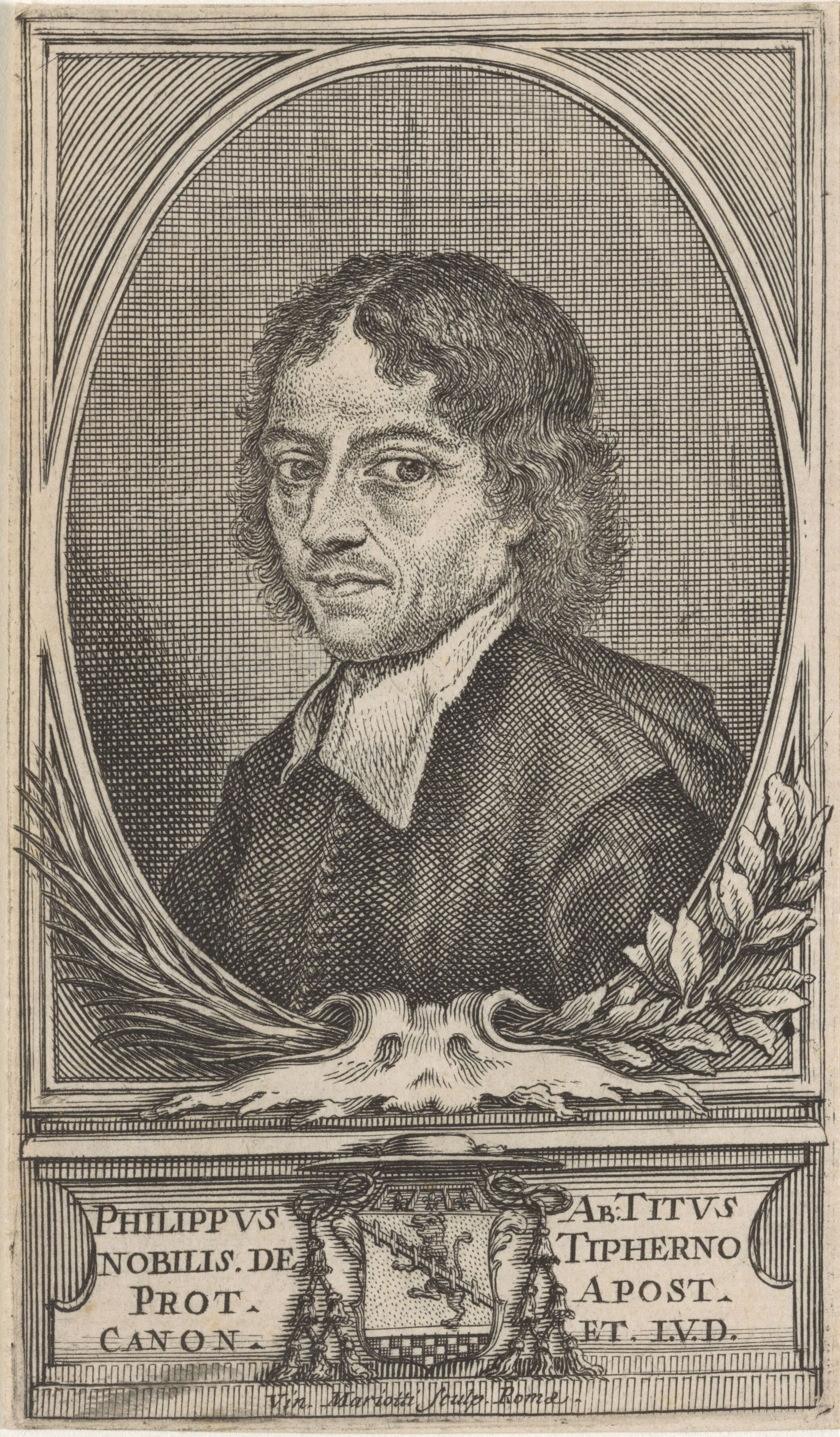
Engraved portrait of Filippo Titi

Abate Filippo Titi (1639 – 23 October 1702) was an Italian Roman Catholic Protonotary apostolic, and an art historian, best known for his inventory of the artistic content of churches in Rome, titled Studio di Pittura scoltura et architettura nelle Chiese di Roma, published by Mancini in 1674.

== Biography ==
Titi was born in town of Città di Castello in Umbria. He studied arts with Virgilio Ducci, a pupil of Francesco Albano.

Titi's Studio was republished by Giuseppe Vannacci in 1686. It was then dedicated to Cardinal Gaspero di Carpegna, the papal Vicar. Titi's index lists about 275 churches. The sections include some of the background of the founding of the church, and the descriptions of the interior are curt; however, there is room for tart commentary such as when he states that to obtain the travertine used to build the Palazzo della Cancelleria nearly half of the Colosseum as well as the entire Arch of Emperor Gordian was undone. His introduction highlights that this book was meant in part to serve as a guidebook to the increasing crowd of visitors that came to Rome as pilgrims or tourists on the Grand Tour. The book was republished over the years A similar guide for Florence had been published nearly a century earlier by Francesco Bocchi.

== Notes ==
A nineteenth century guidebook to Rome, which focused more on antiquity, was published by Carlo Fea.

See Seven Pilgrim Churches of Rome for other antecedent or roughly contemporary guidebooks.
