= Cristofano Allori =

Italian painter of the late Florentine Mannerist school (1577–1621)

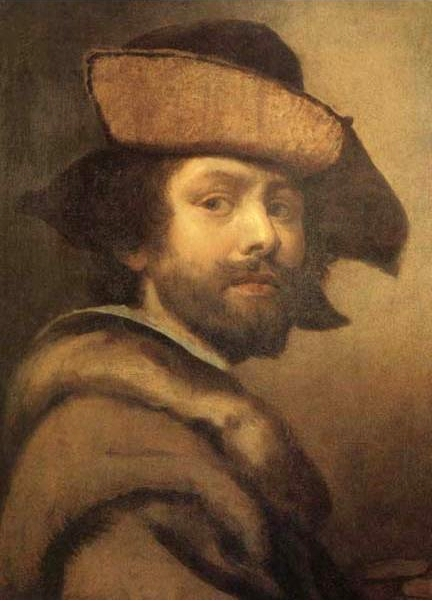
- Self-portrait
- Born: 17 October 1577; Florence
- Died: 1 April 1621; Florence
- Other name: Bronzino
- Occupation: Painter

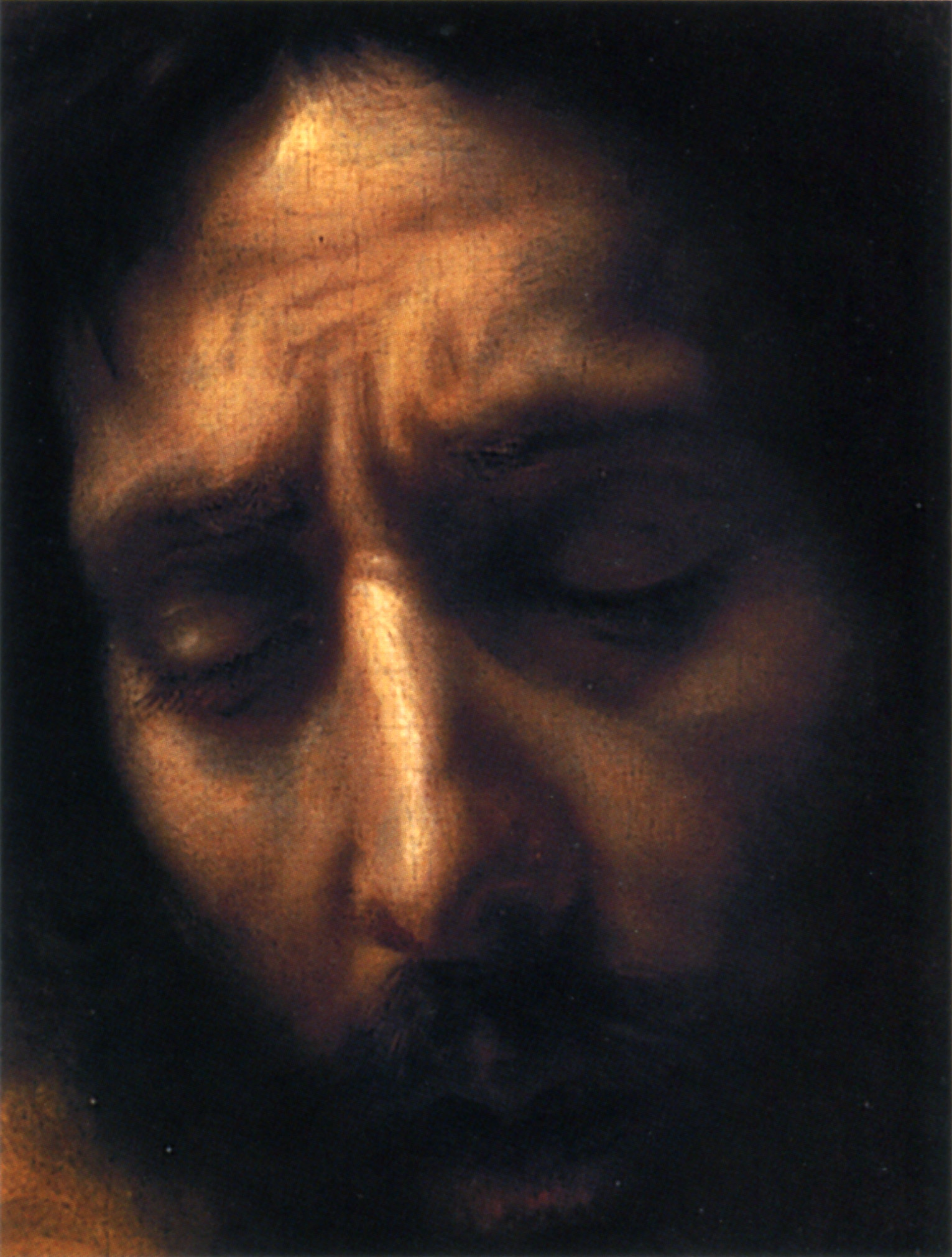
Detail of Holofernes' head from Judith with the Head of Holofernes, thought by some critics to be a self-portrait.

Cristofano Allori (17 October 1577 – 1 April 1621) was an Italian painter of the late Florentine Mannerist school, painting mostly portraits and religious subjects.

== Biography ==
Allori was born at Florence and received his first lessons in painting from his father, Alessandro Allori, but becoming dissatisfied with the hard anatomical drawing and cold coloring of the latter, he entered the studio of Gregorio Pagani, who was one of the leaders of the late Florentine school, which sought to unite the rich coloring of the Venetians with the Florentine attention to drawing. Allori also appears to have worked under Cigoli.

When still young he became a court portraitist for the Medicis, though many of his commissions were replicas of portraits by his predecessor Bronzino, or had participation by others.

His pictures are distinguished by their close adherence to nature and the delicacy and technical perfection of their execution. His technical skill is shown by the fact that several copies he made of Correggio's works were thought to be duplicates by Correggio himself. His extreme fastidiousness limited the number of his works. Several examples are to be seen at Florence and elsewhere.

His most famous work, in his own day and now, is Judith with the Head of Holofernes. It exists in at least two versions by Allori, of which the prime version is perhaps that in the British Royal Collection, dated 1613, with various pentimenti. A version of 1620 in the Palazzo Pitti in Florence is the best known and there are several copies by studio and other hands. There is one copy painted in 1613 in the Vatican Pinacoteca and one in the Gemäldegalerie in Berlin. Strangely, the caption for this copy in Berlin says it may have been painted in 1610 or 1615. Then this copy was painted before the so-called prime version painted in 1613 in the British Royal Collection. According to the near-contemporary biography by Filippo Baldinucci, the model for the Judith was his former mistress, the beautiful "La Mazzafirra" (who is also represented in his Magdalene), the head of Holofernes is a self-portrait, and the maid is the mother of "La Mazzafirra."

== Gallery ==
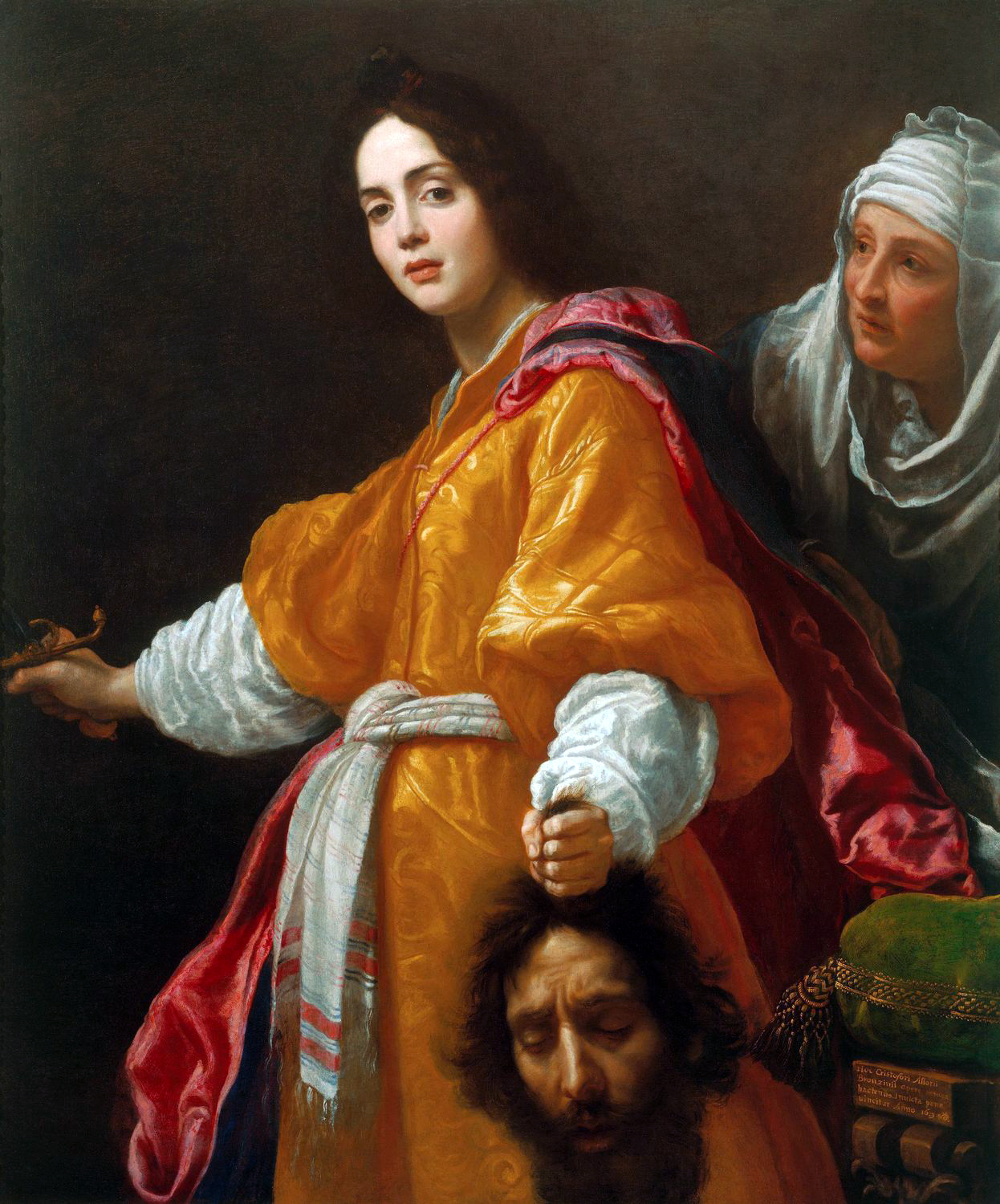
Judith with the Head of Holofernes (Royal Collection version, 1613)

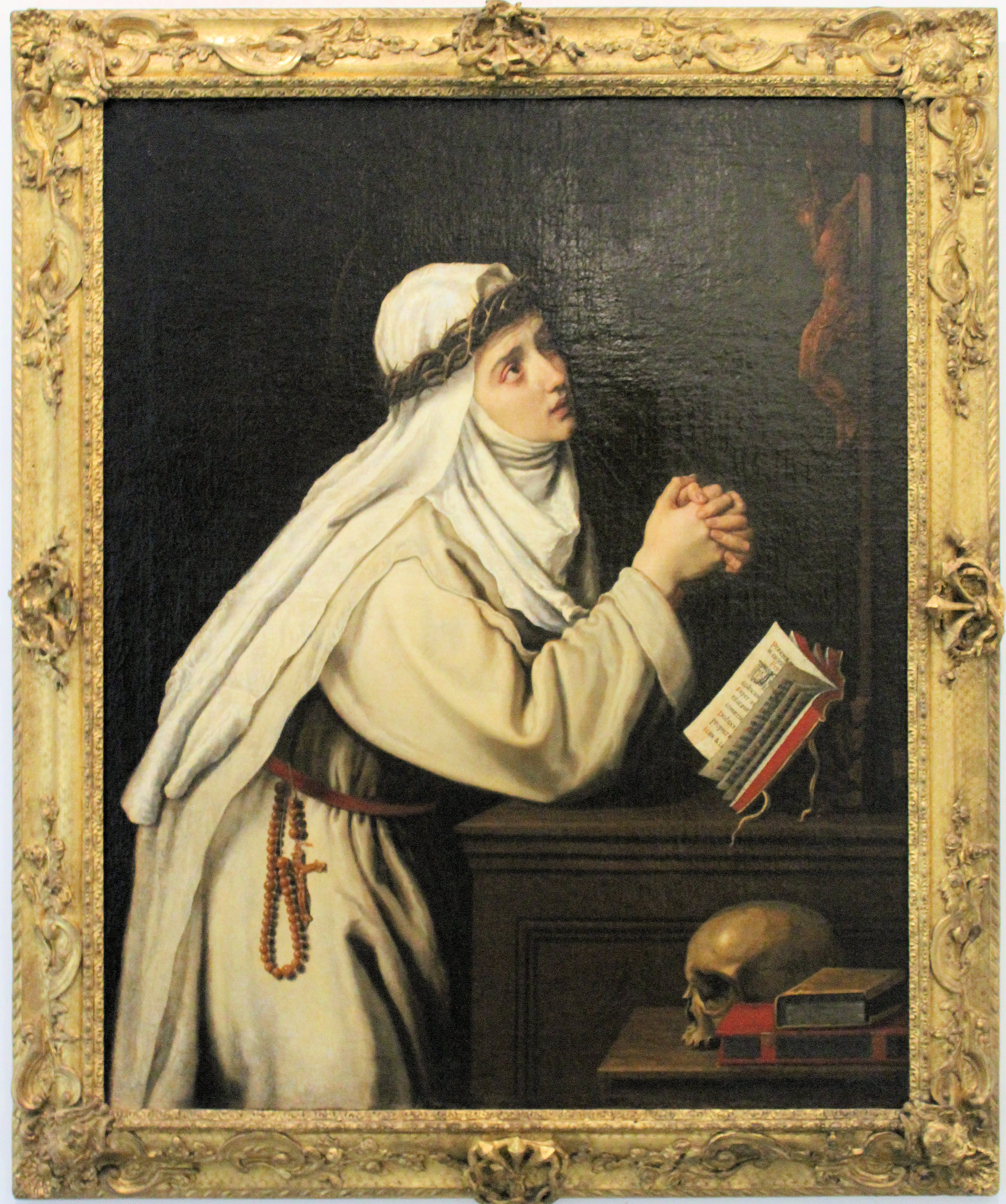
Saint Catherine of Siena. Musée départemental de l'Oise.

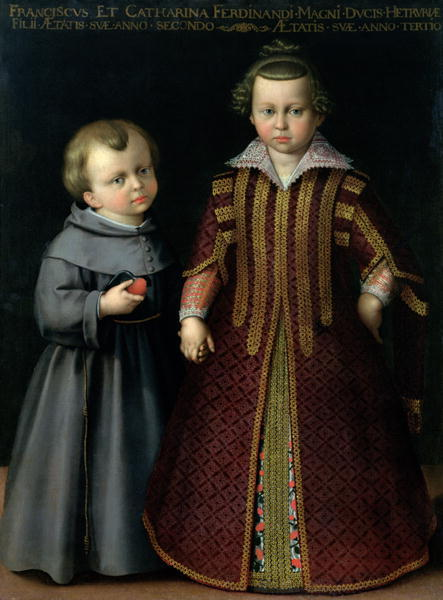
Francesco and Caterina Medici, c. 1598

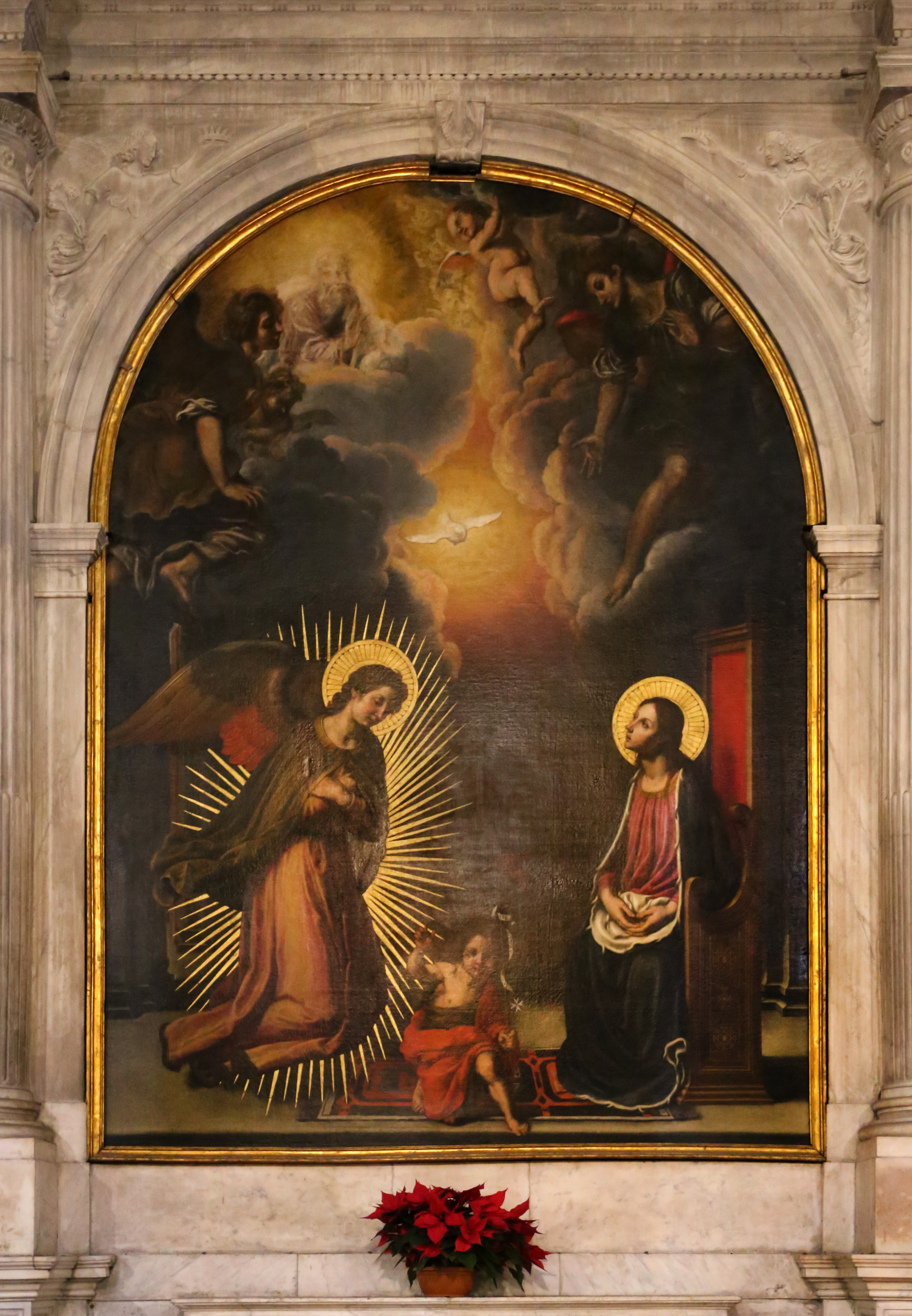
Annunciation, Pistoia Cathedral

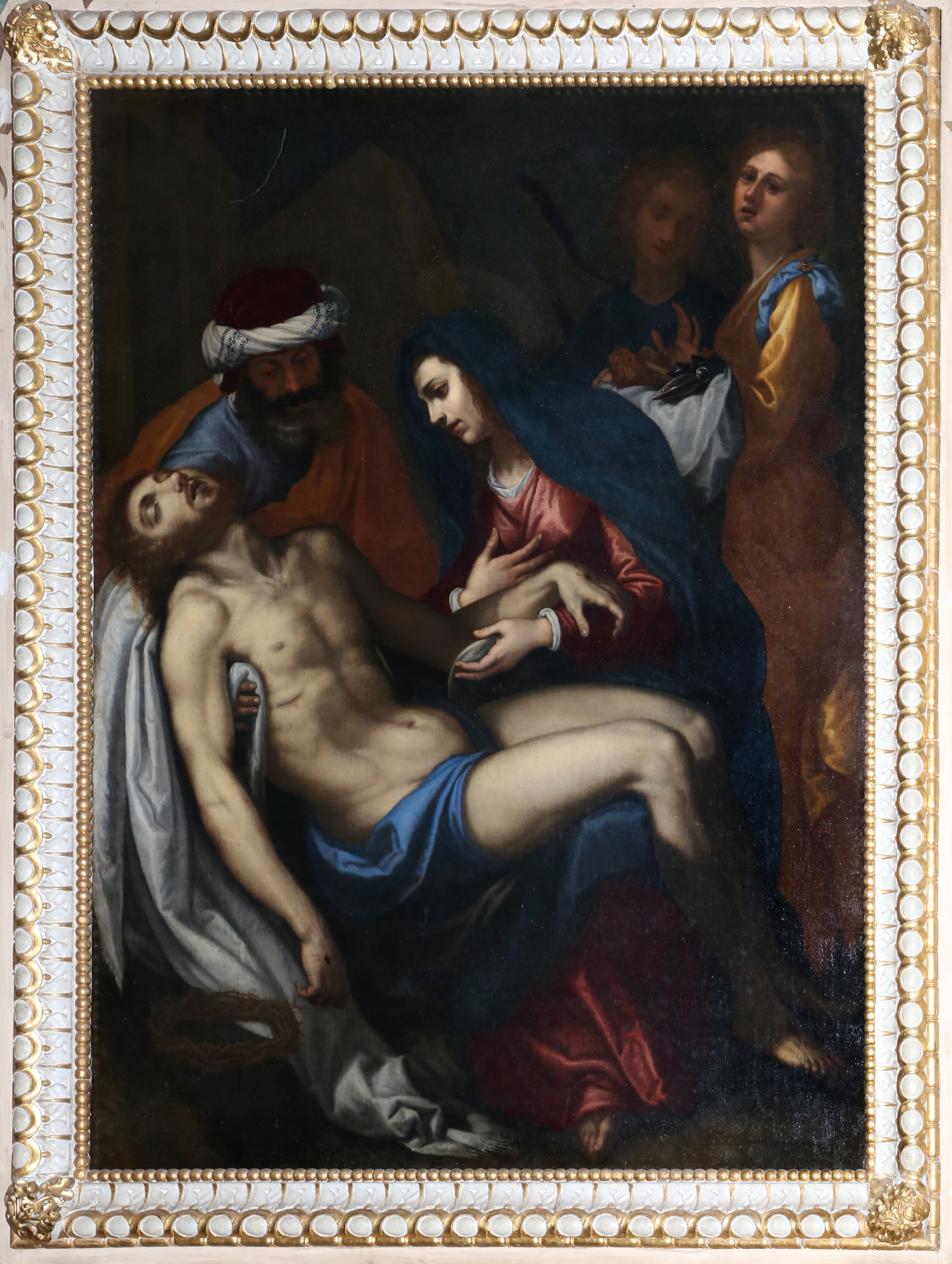
Pieta, around 1600

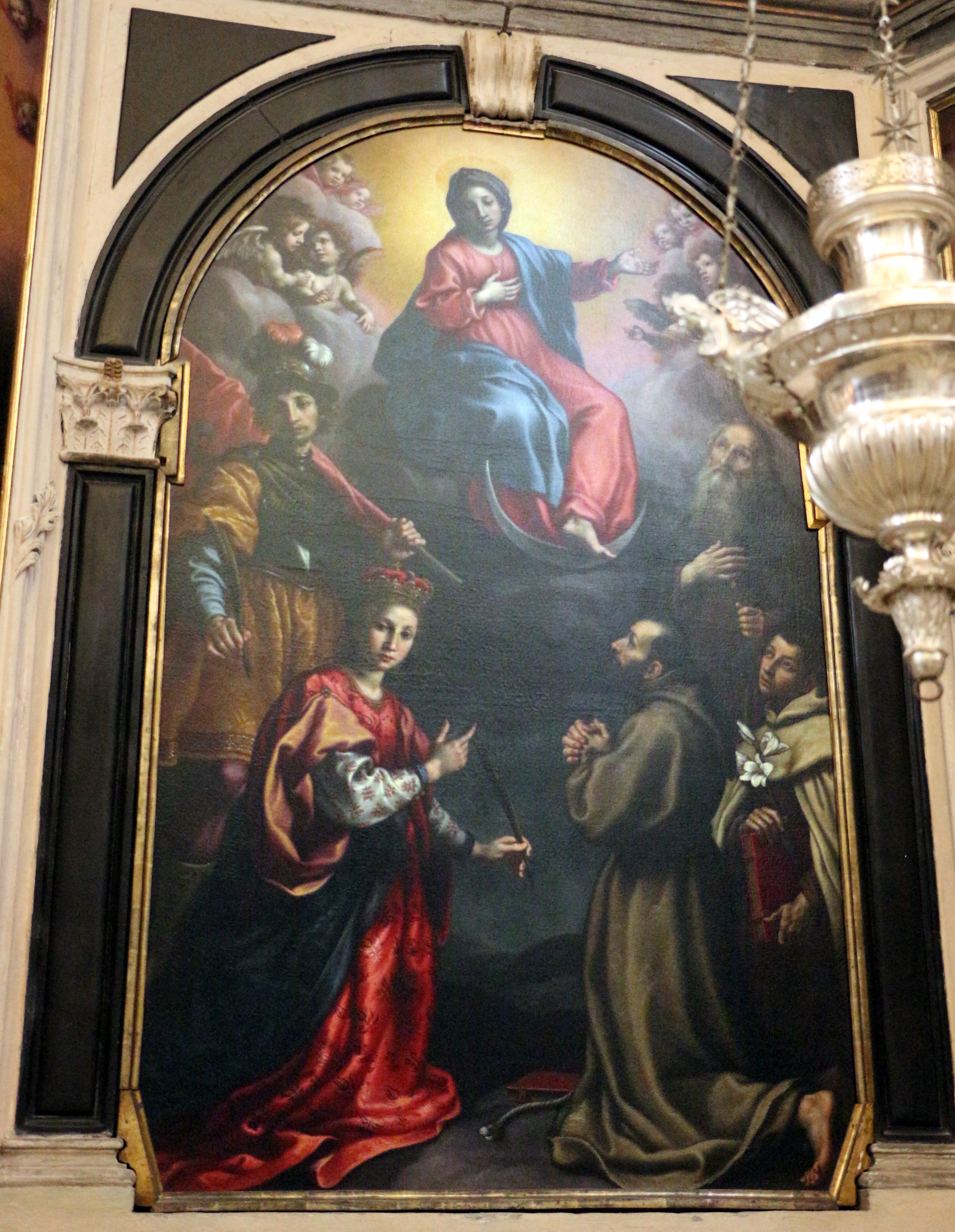
Virgin and Saints

== See also ==
- Judith with the Head of Holofernes

== Sources ==
- Bond, Anthony; Woodall, Joanna (2005). Self Portrait: Renaissance to Contemporary. London: National Portrait Gallery. p. 96.
- Schupbach, Willam. "Letters: Cristofano Allori's 'Judith'", The Burlington Magazine, March, 1979, vol. 121, no. 912, p. 178.
- Shearman, John. "Cristofano Allori's 'Judith'", The Burlington Magazine, January, 1979, vol. 121, vo. 910, pp. 2-10.
- Whitaker, Lucy, and Clayton, Martin. The Art of Italy in the Royal Collection; Renaissance and Baroque, Royal Collection Publications, 2007, ISBN 9781902163291
