= Holofernes (disambiguation) =

Holofernes was an Assyrian invading general of Nebuchadnezzar, who appears in the deuterocanonical Book of Judith.

Holofernes may also refer to:

- Holofernes (character), a schoolmaster in Shakespeare's Love's Labour's Lost
- Judith Holofernes (born 1976), German musician and lyricist

== See also ==
- Judith and Holofernes (disambiguation)
- Pericopis holofernes, a synonym of the moth Dysschema terminata
