= Judith and Her Maidservant (Artemisia Gentileschi, Naples) =

Painting by Artemisia Gentileschi

Judith and Maidservant with Head of Holofernes
- Judith and her Maidservant
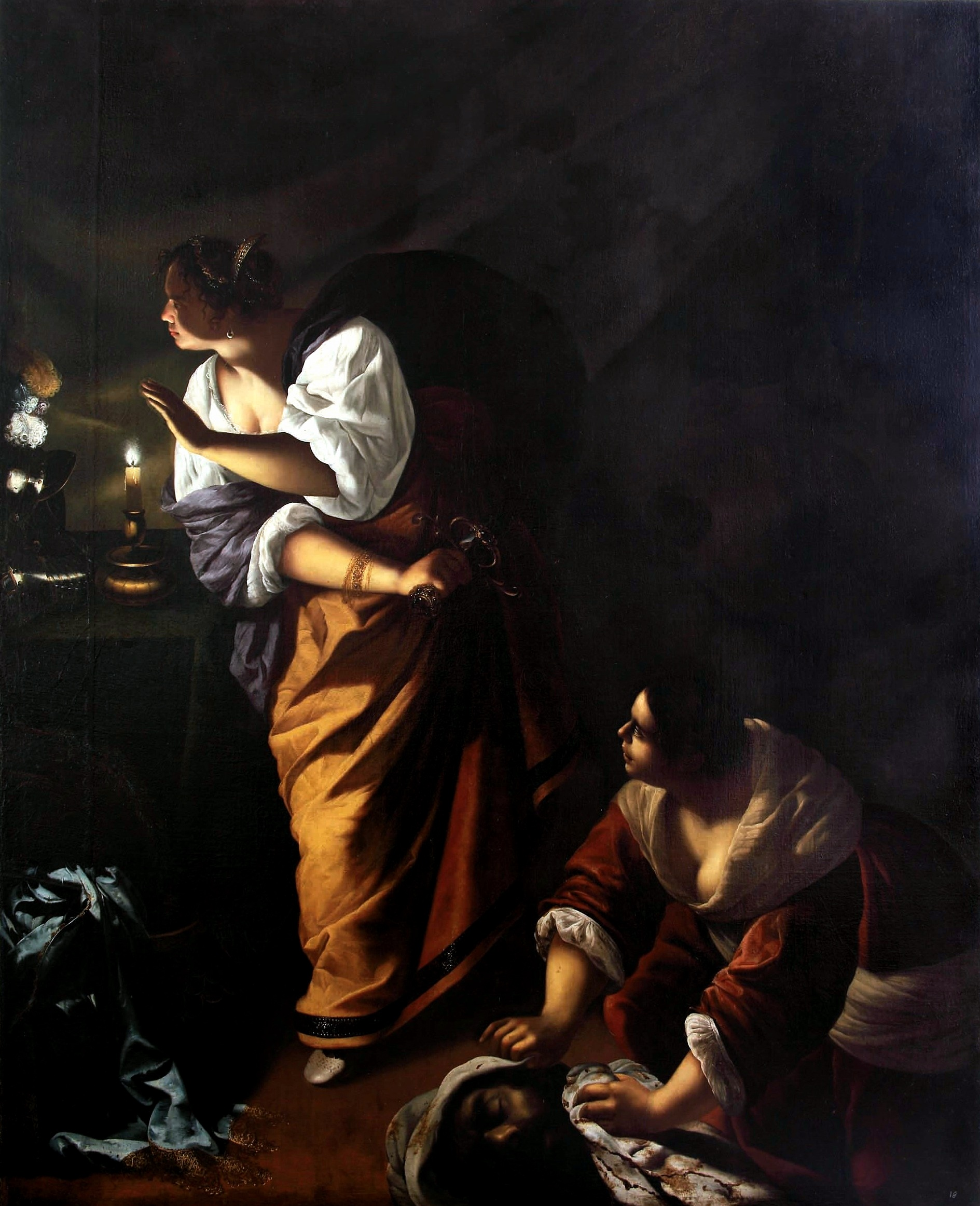
- Artist: Artemisia Gentileschi
- Year: c. 1645-50
- Medium: oil on canvas
- Dimensions: 272 cm (107 in) × 221 cm (87 in)
- Location: Museo di Capodimonte
- Identifiers: Bildindex der Kunst und Architektur ID: 20284031

Judith and Her Maidservant is a painting by the Italian baroque artist Artemisia Gentileschi. Executed sometime between 1645 and 1650, it hangs in the Museo di Capodimonte in Naples. The story comes from the deuterocanonical Book of Judith, in which Judith seduces and then assassinates the general Holofernes, who had besieged Judith's town. The exact moment depicted takes place after the murder when her maidservant places the severed head in a bag, while Judith checks around her.

It is the third of three paintings that Gentileschi painted of the same moment, all using a similar design. The first, painted between 1623 and 1625, hangs in the Detroit Institute of Arts, while the second, painted in the early 1640s, now hangs in the Musée de la Castre in Cannes. Recent research suggests that it may have been in the collection of Giovanni Andrea Lumaga, a wealthy Venetian merchant with ties to Naples, in the late 1600s.

== See also ==
- List of works by Artemisia Gentileschi
