= Judith and Holofernes (Donatello) =

Sculpture by Donatello

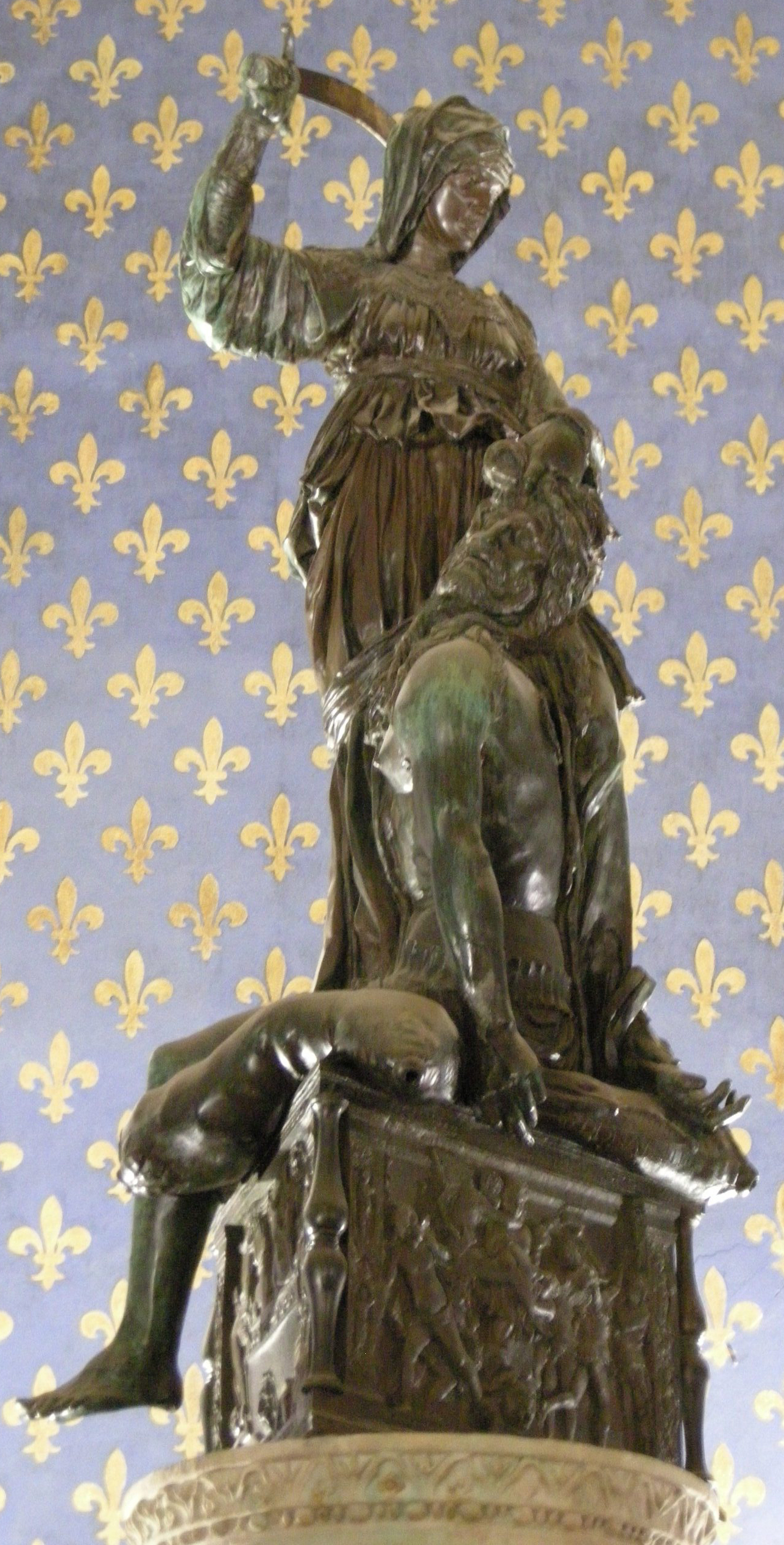
- Judith and Holofernes
- Artist: Donatello
- Year: 1457–1464
- Type: Bronze
- Dimensions: 236 cm (93 in)
- Location: Palazzo Vecchio, Florence

Judith and Holofernes (1457–1464) is a bronze sculpture created by the Italian Renaissance sculptor Donatello towards the end of his life and career. It is located in the Hall of Lilies (Sala dei Gigli), in the Palazzo Vecchio, Florence, Italy. A copy stands in one of the sculpture's original positions on the Piazza della Signoria, in front of the Palazzo Vecchio.

It depicts the assassination of the Assyrian general Holofernes by Judith, and is remarkable for being one of the first Renaissance sculptures to be conceived in the round as a free-standing statue, with its four distinct faces. The subject of Judith beheading Holofernes, depicting the climax of the story in the deuterocanonical Book of Judith, was a common subject in art, and is associated with the Power of Women topos.

== Background and description ==
The statue was commissioned by Cosimo de' Medici as a decoration for the fountain in the garden of the Palazzo Medici-Riccardi. Together with Donatello's David, it was positioned in front of the palace around 1457, when Cosimo de' Medici's extended family decided to move into it. Although the exact place where these two were displayed is unknown, both of these statues became a symbol for the power Florence possessed.

Judith and Holofernes depicts Judith standing powerfully with a raised axe, holding the head of Holofernes by his hair. The statue was originally gilded; some gilding remains on the sword. To facilitate the gilding, the bronze was cast in 11 parts. The base of the sculpture resembles a cushion, a naturalistic device first used by Donatello for his St. Mark in the Orsanmichele. Intended to function as a fountain, this statue sits on a triangular pedestal with holes for water to flow through. The four corners of the cushion and three relief carvings in the base serve as outlets for the water.

== Symbolism of Judith ==
Both Judith and David are underdogs from Old Testament stories, and are also seen placed in close proximity in the fresco of Santa Maria Antiqua, as well as on Lorenzo Ghiberti's East Baptistry Doors. Judith is considered the symbol of liberty, virtue, and victory of the weak over the strong in a just cause. Christian symbolism of Judith reveals her actions over Holofernes to be a victory of virtue—particularly concerning self-control, chastity, and humility, as opposed to promiscuity and pride. Her story in the Power of Women topos depicts the weak overcoming the assumed victor in an effort to protect her home. This is symbolic of the city of Florence, who fought to protect their Republic of Florence from foreign powers and to the Medici specifically upholding their pride in the city.

== Interpretation ==
The anticipated slashing of the general's neck and overall notion of beheading is emphasized visually in the statue through Judith's intent gaze and strongly cocked arm wielding her blade ready to strike. In addition, carved into Holofernes' back is a medallion structured to appear to be hanging from his neck – historically known as a symbol of pride. Many scholars believe that in this instance the necklace is direct symbolism of pride evidenced by Psalms 73:6, which states, "the wicked wear pride like a necklace and violence wraps them round." It is also argued that the statue is meant to be viewed from the side rather than straight on. By viewing from an angle, the emphasis is on Holofernes' neck, flanked by both of Judith's legs underneath her garments, and is the center of attention as Judith pulls her arm back to strike. This would render the inscription "Behold the neck of pride served by the hand of humility" the most accurately depicted.

It is believed that an inscription on the granite pedestal originally read, "Kingdoms fall through luxury [sin], cities rise through virtues. Behold the neck of pride severed by the hand of humility." This dramatic and detailed statue is thus a metaphor of the Medici rule, as the defenders of Florentine liberty, akin to Judith, slayer of the tyrant Holofernes and defender of the people. This view is supported by accounts that mention a second inscription on the pedestal which read, "The salvation of the state. Piero de' Medici son of Cosimo dedicated this statue of a woman both to liberty and to fortitude, whereby the citizens with unvanquished and constant heart might return to the republic." Inscribed on the cushion are the words OPVS . DONATELLI . FLO (the work of the Florentine, Donatello).

The base of the sculpture contains some of the earliest Renaissance examples of putti and pueri mingentes, who are depicted treading grapes, drinking, and urinating. The boys' indulgent drinking symbolizes Holofernes' lack of self-control, which ultimately leads to his death while drunk, and their urination symbolizes Holofernes' lust for Judith.

== Placement ==
In 1495, the sculpture was placed on the Piazza della Signoria, at the side of main door the Palazzo Vecchio, in memory of the expulsion of Piero di Lorenzo de' Medici from Florence and the introduction of the Florentine republic under Girolamo Savonarola. This time, this statue symbolized the expulsion of the tyrannical Medici. The statue was later moved to the courtyard inside the Palazzo Vecchio, and 1506 into the Loggia dei Lanzi. In 1919, it was then placed on the left side of the Palazzo Vecchio. It was replaced by a bronze copy in 1988 and the original, after restoration, was given a final place in the Sala dei Gigli inside the Palazzo Vecchio.

== See also ==
- Perseus with the Head of Medusa
- Daylit Gallery – Exhibition space in the Victoria and Albert Museum
- Judith and Holofernes (disambiguation) (works by other artists on the same theme)
