= Judith and Her Maidservant (Artemisia Gentileschi, Oslo) =

Painting by Artemisia Gentileschi

Judith and her Maidservant with the Head of Holofernes
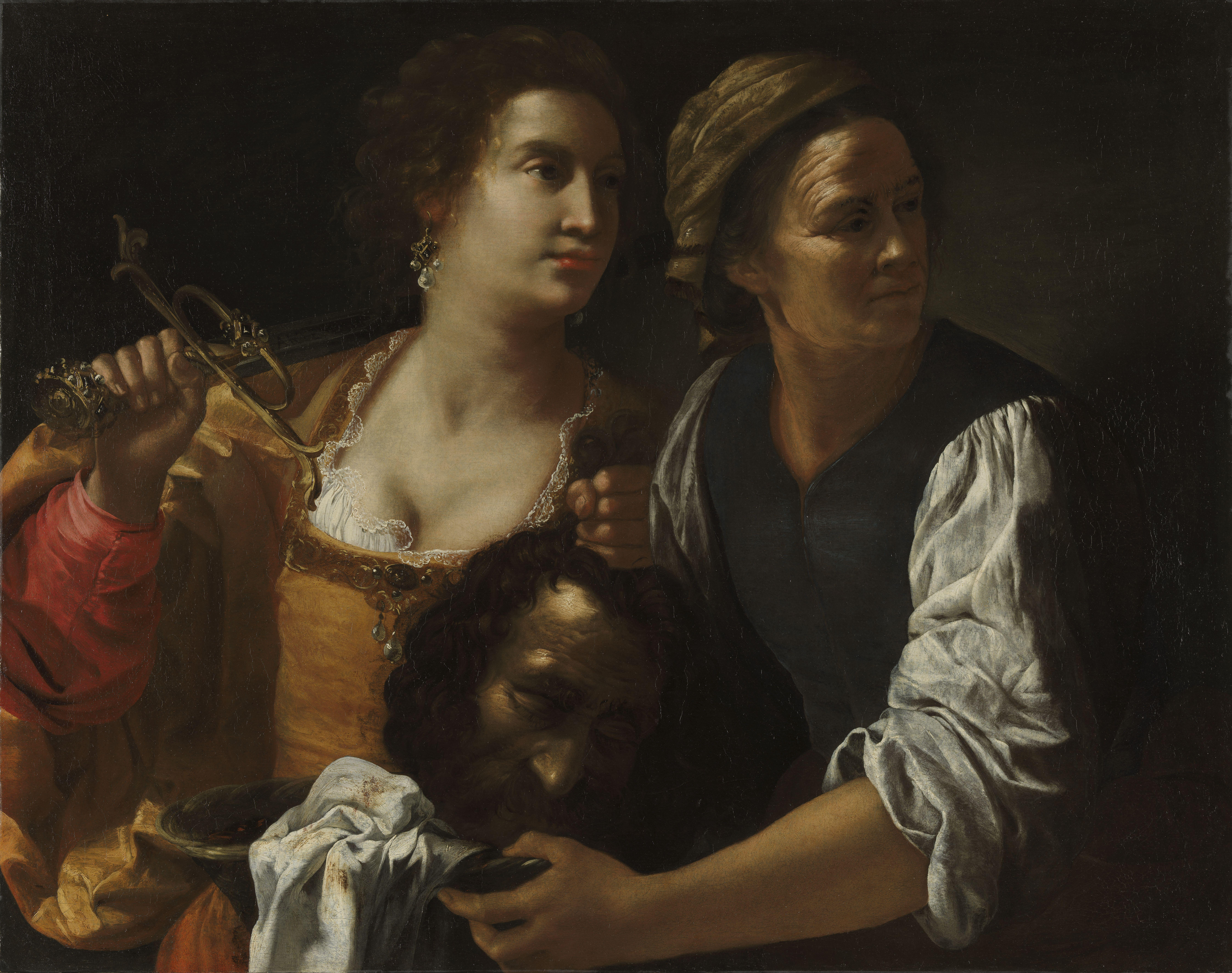
- Artist: Artemisia Gentileschi
- Dimensions: 73.2 cm (28.8 in) × 92.5 cm (36.4 in) × 3 cm (1.2 in)
- Owner: Sparebankstiftelsen DNB’s collection

Judith and her Maidservant with the Head of Holofernes is a painting by the Italian artist Artemisia Gentileschi, created in 1639-1640. It was one of many paintings by Gentileschi that treats the theme of Judith, who beheads the Assyrian general Holofernes, who was planning to destroy Judith's home city of Bethulia.

The painting has been in Oslo, in the collection of the National Museum of Art, Architecture and Design, since 2022.

== See also ==
- List of works by Artemisia Gentileschi
