= Mars and Venus Surprised by Vulcan =

Painting by Tintoretto

- Amore, Venere e Marte (Italian)
- Artist: Jacopo Tintoretto
- Year: 1551–1552
- Medium: Oil on canvas
- Dimensions: 135 cm × 198 cm (53 in × 78 in)
- Location: Alte Pinakothek, Munich

Mars and Venus Surprised by Vulcan or Venus, Vulcan and Mars is a 1551-1552 oil on canvas painting by Jacopo Tintoretto, now in the Alte Pinakothek in Munich.

The painting depicts a scene of adultery. The goddess Venus is lying nude on a couch whilst her lover Mars is hiding helmeted under a bed. Venus' husband Vulcan, tipped off by Apollo, has just returned unexpectedly and has become distracted by his wife's naked body, disregarding the warnings of his dog. Cupid is sleeping in a cot by the window.
