= Judith with the Head of Holofernes (Cristofano Allori) =

Two paintings by Cristofano Allori

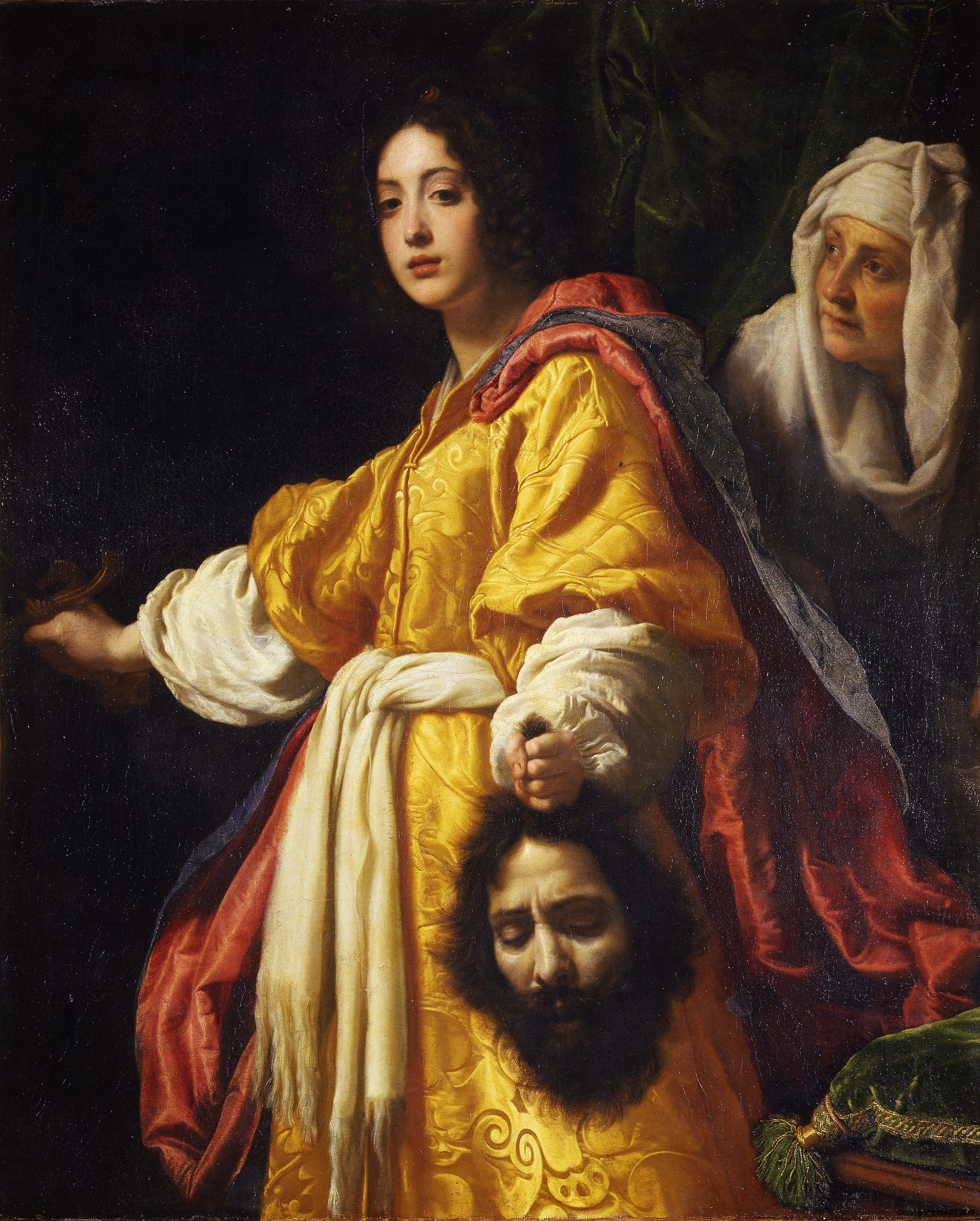
Florence version (Inv. 1912 n. 96), 139 x 116 cm (55 x 46 in)

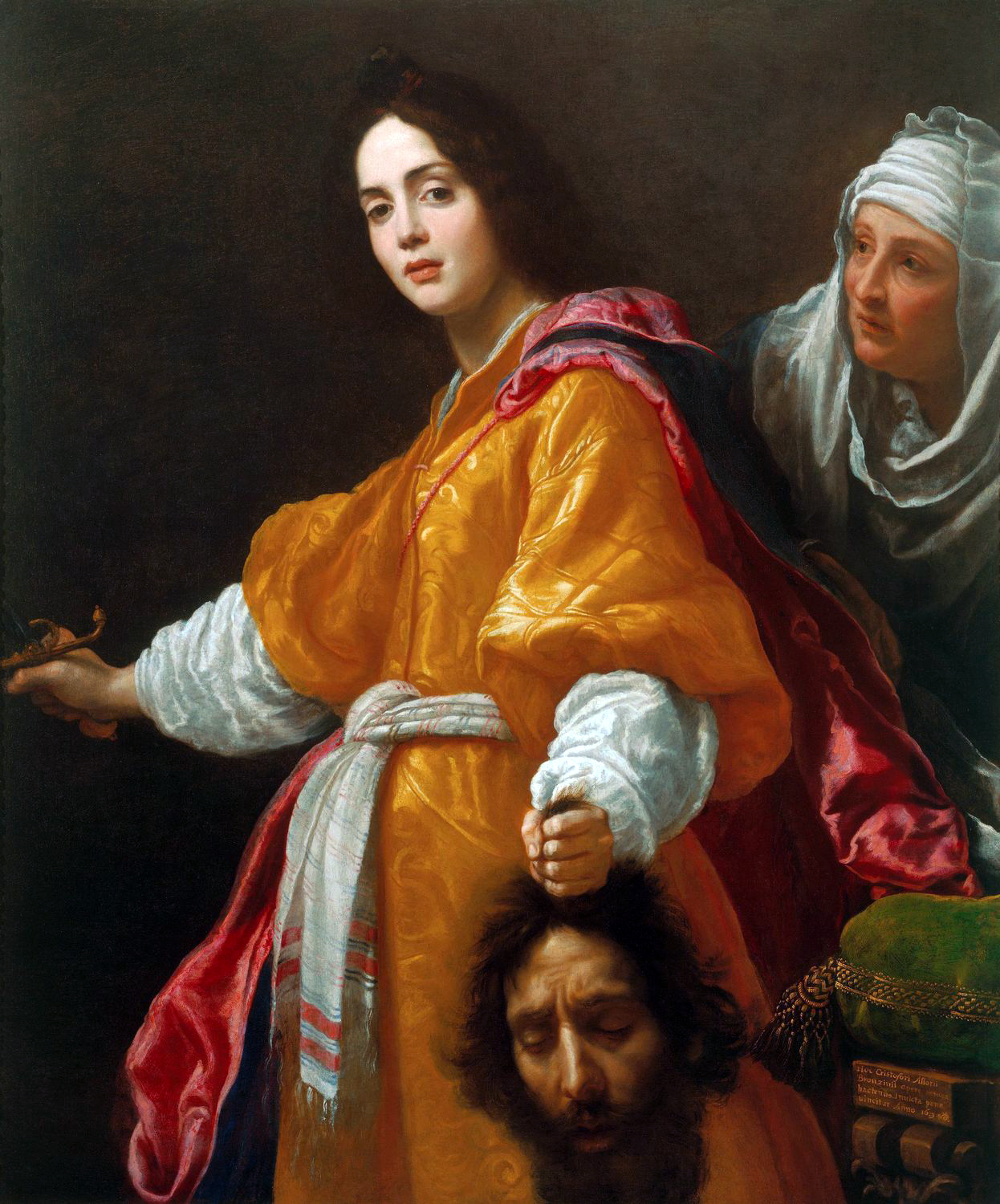
Edinburgh version (RCIN 404989), 120.4 x 100.3 cm (47.4 x 39.5 in)

Judith with the Head of Holofernes and Judith Holding the Head of Holofernes are names given to two paintings by Cristofano Allori carried out between 1610 and 1613.

== Versions ==
One hangs in the Palazzo Pitti in Florence and is dated to between 1610 and 1612. The second is part of the Royal Collection of the United Kingdom and hangs in the Palace of Holyroodhouse in Edinburgh. There are also several copies and numerous prints by other painters and engravers. The painting depicts the account of Judith beheading Holofernes from the deuterocanonical Book of Judith, which was a popular subject in Baroque art.

== Sources ==
- Bisceglia, Anna. "Judith with the Head of Holofernes". Le Gallerie degli Uffizi. Retrieved 3 September 2022.
- Bond, Anthony; Woodall, Joanna (2005). Self Portrait: Renaissance to Contemporary. London: National Portrait Gallery. p. 96.
- Champlin, John Denison Jr., ed. (1913). Cyclopedia of Painters and Paintings. Vol. 2. New York: Charles Scribner's Sons. p. 362.
- Shearman, John (1983). The Early Italian Pictures in the Collection of Her Majesty the Queen. Cambridge: Cambridge University Press. pp. 6–7.
- Whitaker, Lucy; Clayton, Martin (2007). The Art of Italy in the Royal Collection: Renaissance & Baroque . St James's Palace, London: Royal Collection Enterprises Ltd. pp. 32, 70, 270–271.
- "Judith with the Head of Holofernes Signed and dated 1613". Royal Collection Trust. Retrieved 3 September 2022.
