= Judith Slaying Holofernes (Artemisia Gentileschi, Naples) =

1612–13 painting by Artemisia Gentileschi

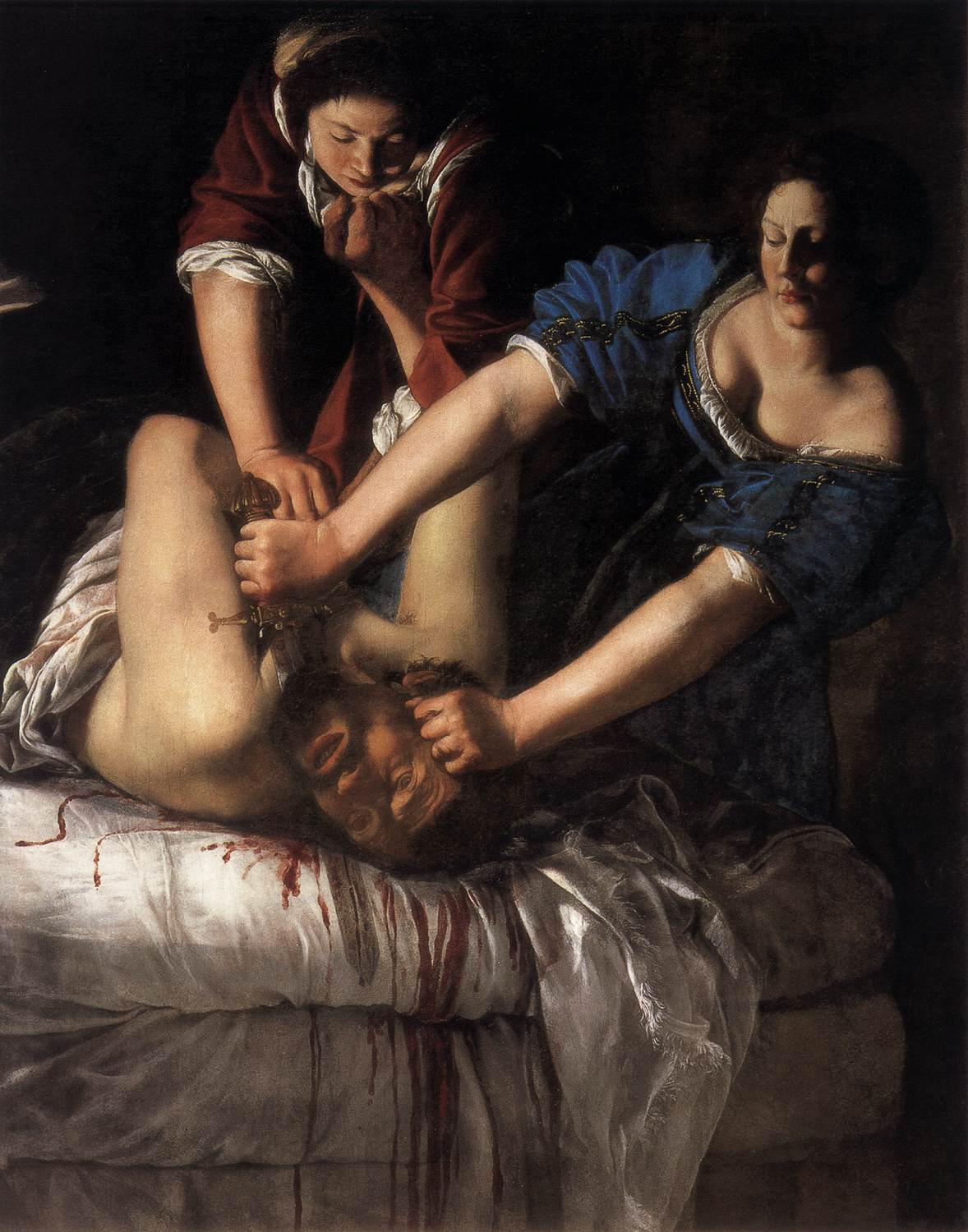
- Artist: Artemisia Gentileschi
- Year: c. 1612–1613
- Medium: Oil on canvas
- Dimensions: 158.8 cm × 125.5 cm (78.33 in × 64.13 in)
- Location: Museo Capodimonte, Naples

Judith Slaying Holofernes is a painting by the Italian early Baroque artist Artemisia Gentileschi, completed in 1612–13 and now at the Museo Capodimonte, Naples, Italy.

The picture is considered one of her iconic works. The canvas shows Judith beheading Holofernes. The subject takes an episode from the deuterocanonical Book of Judith in the Old Testament, which recounts the assassination of the Assyrian general Holofernes by the Israelite heroine Judith. The painting shows the moment when Judith, helped by her maidservant Abra, beheads the general after he has fallen asleep in a drunken stupor. The composition places Judith on the right side of the canvas, actively restraining Holofernes while performing the beheading, while Abra assists from behind by holding the figure in place. The scene is tightly structured and emphasizes physical immediacy through close spatial framing. Gentileschi employs strong chiaroscuro, with dramatic contrasts between light and shadow that highlight the figures and intensify the sense of action. The lighting draws attention to the movement and effort involved in the scene, while the surrounding darkness focuses attention on the central figures and the violent act being depicted. She painted a second version (now in the Uffizi, Florence) somewhere between 1613 and 1621.

Early feminist critics interpreted the painting as a form of visual revenge following Gentileschi's rape by Agostino Tassi in 1611; similarly many other art historians see the painting in the context of her achievement in portraying strong women.

== Interpretation and gender representation ==
The figure of Judith has been widely interpreted in art history as a symbol of female agency and strength, particularly in relation to Artemisia Gentileschi’s depiction of the subject. Judith, a biblical figure who kills Holofernes to save her city, is often associated with themes of courage and decisive action. In Gentileschi’s version, scholars such as Mary Garrard argue that the composition emphasizes Judith’s active physical role in the violence of the scene, distinguishing it from earlier depictions by male artists such as Caravaggio, who often portray the moment with greater restraint or distance. Gentileschi’s interpretation has therefore been discussed in relation to broader questions of gender representation in Baroque art, particularly the ways in which female figures are shown exercising control, strength, and agency.

== Historical and cultural context ==
The subject of Judith beheading Holofernes was widely represented in Renaissance and Baroque art. Earlier Renaissance interpretations often emphasized moral qualities associated with Judith, such as chastity and humility. For example, Lucas Cranach the Elder depicted Judith holding the severed head of Holofernes in a composed and restrained manner, emphasizing symbolic rather than physical violence. In contrast, Artemisia Gentileschi’s version focuses on the moment of active beheading, with greater attention to physical struggle and anatomical realism. Donatello also produced an influential earlier interpretation in sculpture, portraying Judith standing over Holofernes in a composition that has been interpreted as a moral warning against pride and tyranny, including associations with the Medici context in Florence.

During the Baroque period, depictions of Judith became more dramatic and emotionally intense. Artists such as Johann Liss incorporated heightened realism and violent imagery, including visible blood and dynamic movement, reflecting broader Baroque interests in theatricality and physical immediacy. Gentileschi’s work shares these characteristics but is distinguished by its focus on the moment of action rather than aftermath, as well as the active participation of Judith’s maidservant.

Michelangelo Merisi da Caravaggio’s painting Judith Beheading Holofernes is considered a major influence on later Baroque interpretations of the subject, including Gentileschi’s version. Scholars such as Mary Garrard have noted that Caravaggio’s approach emphasizes dramatic human conflict and psychological tension through naturalism and stark lighting. Gentileschi adapts similar stylistic elements, particularly chiaroscuro and realism, while intensifying the physical engagement of the figures and the immediacy of the violence depicted.

== Creation ==
Artemisia Gentileschi was around twenty years of age when she painted Judith Slaying Holofernes. Previously, Gentileschi had also completed Susanna and the Elders and Madonna and Child. These artworks already give an indication of Gentileschi's skill in representing body movement and facial expressions to express emotions. X-rays undertaken on the painting show that Gentileschi made several alterations to the painting (e.g. the position of both Judith's arms and the drapery) before it reached its current state.

== Sources and analysis ==
The episode of Judith beheading Holofernes is from a deuterocanonical book of the Bible. The episode is from the apocryphal Book of Judith in the Old Testament, which recounts the assassination of the Assyrian general Holofernes by the Israelite heroine Judith. Gentileschi draws upon the most climactic part of the Book of Judith where the beheading takes place.

Judith Slaying Holofernes has been considered to be related to the Power of Woman theme. Historian Susan L. Smith defines the "power of woman" as "the representational practice of bringing together at least two, but usually more, well-known figures from the Bible, ancient history or romance to exemplify a cluster of interrelated themes that include the wiles of woman, the power of love and the trials of marriage. Gentileschi plays into the "wiles of woman" in her painting by literally portraying Judith at the main point of her domination over a man. Judith is shown as a beautiful woman, which helped her entice Holofernes, and also as a fierce heroine.

The painting is relentlessly physical, from the wide spurts of blood to the energy of the two women as they perform the act. The effort of the women's struggle is most finely represented by the delicate face of the maid, who is younger than in other treatments of the same theme, which is grasped by the oversized, muscular fist of Holofernes as he desperately struggles to survive. Judith Slaying Holofernes utilises deeper primary colours in comparison to the Florentine version. Judith is shown wearing a cobalt blue dress with gold accents and her maidservant wears a red gown. Both women have their sleeves rolled up. As a follower of Caravaggio, Artemisia Gentileschi makes use of chiaroscuro in the painting, with a dark background contrasting with the light shining directly on the scene of Judith beheading Holofernes.

== History ==
Little is known of the painting's early history, however many scholars believe it was created while Artemisia was still living in Rome. Its location was unknown until documented in the collection of Signora Saveria de Simone in Naples in 1827. At some point in the painting's history, the left and top parts of the painting were cut off, leaving a curtailed version of the original painting.

=== Renaissance ===
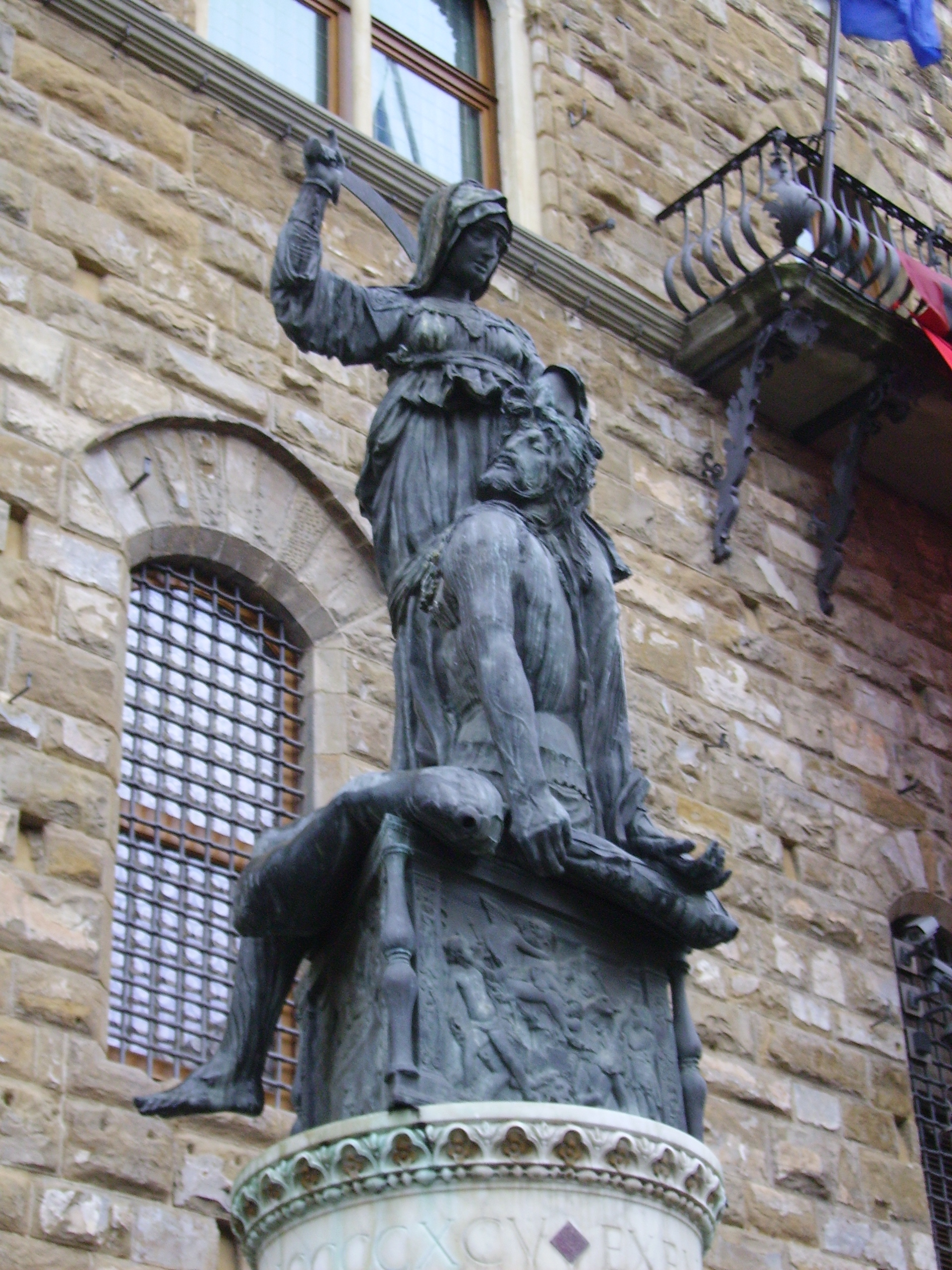
Donatello, Judith and Holofernes, c. 1457–1464. Bronze; 236cm Palazzo Vecchio, Florence

The Renaissance had a long-standing history of portraying Judith. Many artists believed that the heroine Judith held many different qualities like chastity and humility. Lucas Cranach the Elder painted a very straightforward version of Judith now known as Judith with the Head of Holofernes. Cranach's Judith is shown with a resolved look on her face as she holds a sword in her hand. She wears an ornate green dress, and the viewer can only see up to her mid-thigh region. Her body is cut off due to a marble ledge where the head of Holofernes is placed. There is no gushing blood and Judith seems to have made a clean cut through Holofernes' neck. The phlegmatic look on Judith's face contrasts the intensity of her beheading. Gentileschi captures the emotions of Judith's face but maintains more medical accuracy with the blood that is spilling down the bed. She shows Judith in the act of beheading rather than showing her holding the head of Holofernes as Cranach did.

Donatello contributed his own interpretation with his sculpture Judith and Holofernes where Judith is depicted towering over Holofernes with a sword over her head. Holofernes' body slumps over, and his head is still attached to his body. Donatello's Judith and Holofernes sought to symbolize the theme of pride in Holofernes and stands as a cautionary tale to the Medici family. Writer Roger J. Crum notes that, "Judith's gesture, pulling back the general's head, renders sure her next blow, it also makes the neck all the more visible. 'Behold the neck of pride' commanded the inscription, and Donatello's treatment facilitated compliance". Unlike Donatello's sculpture, Gentileschi shows Judith triumphing over Holofernes in the climactic moment of the beheading. Gentileschi also chose to show Judith without a head covering and includes Judith's maidservant.

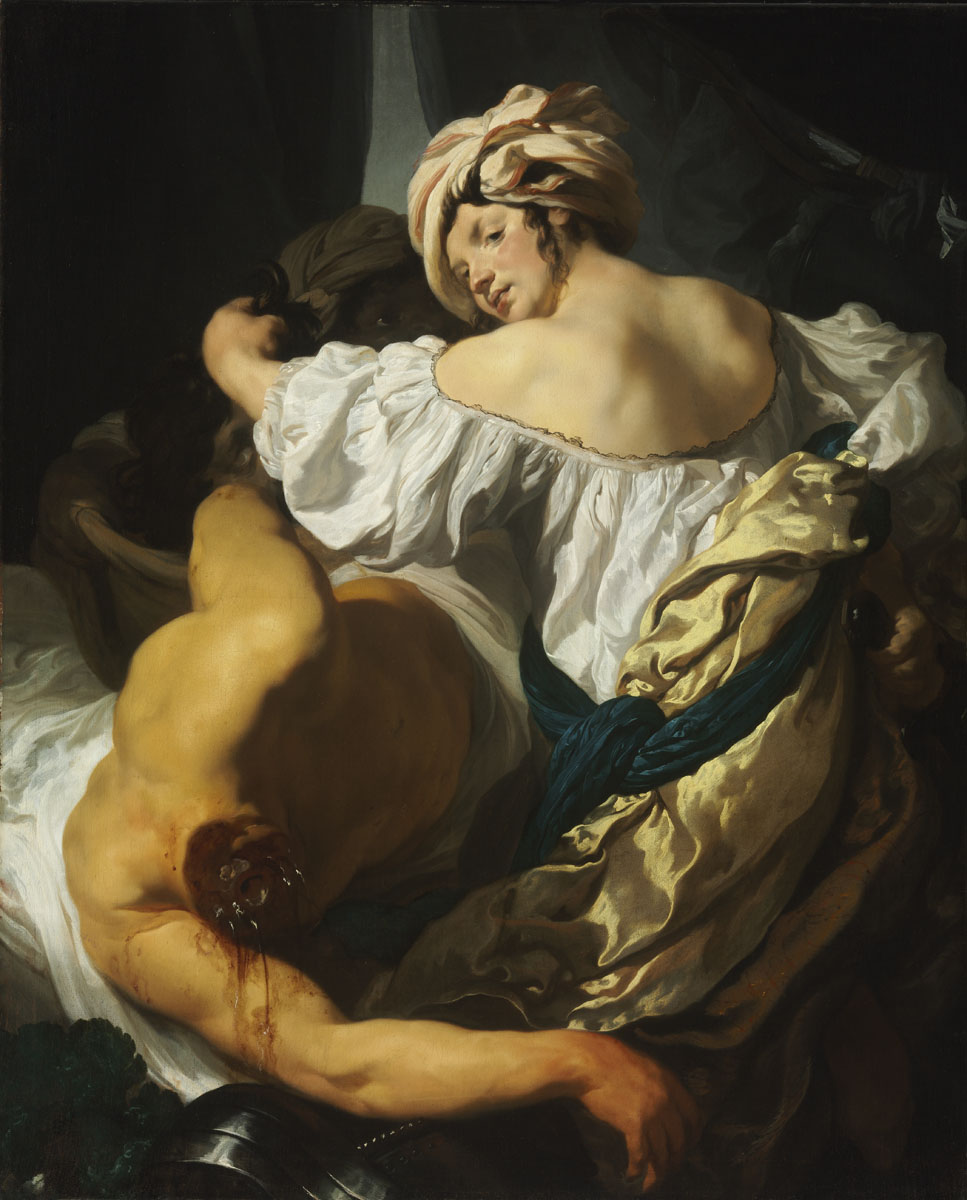
Johann Liss. Judith in the Tent of Holofernes, c. 1622. Oil on canvas; 128.5 x 99 cm. The National Gallery, London

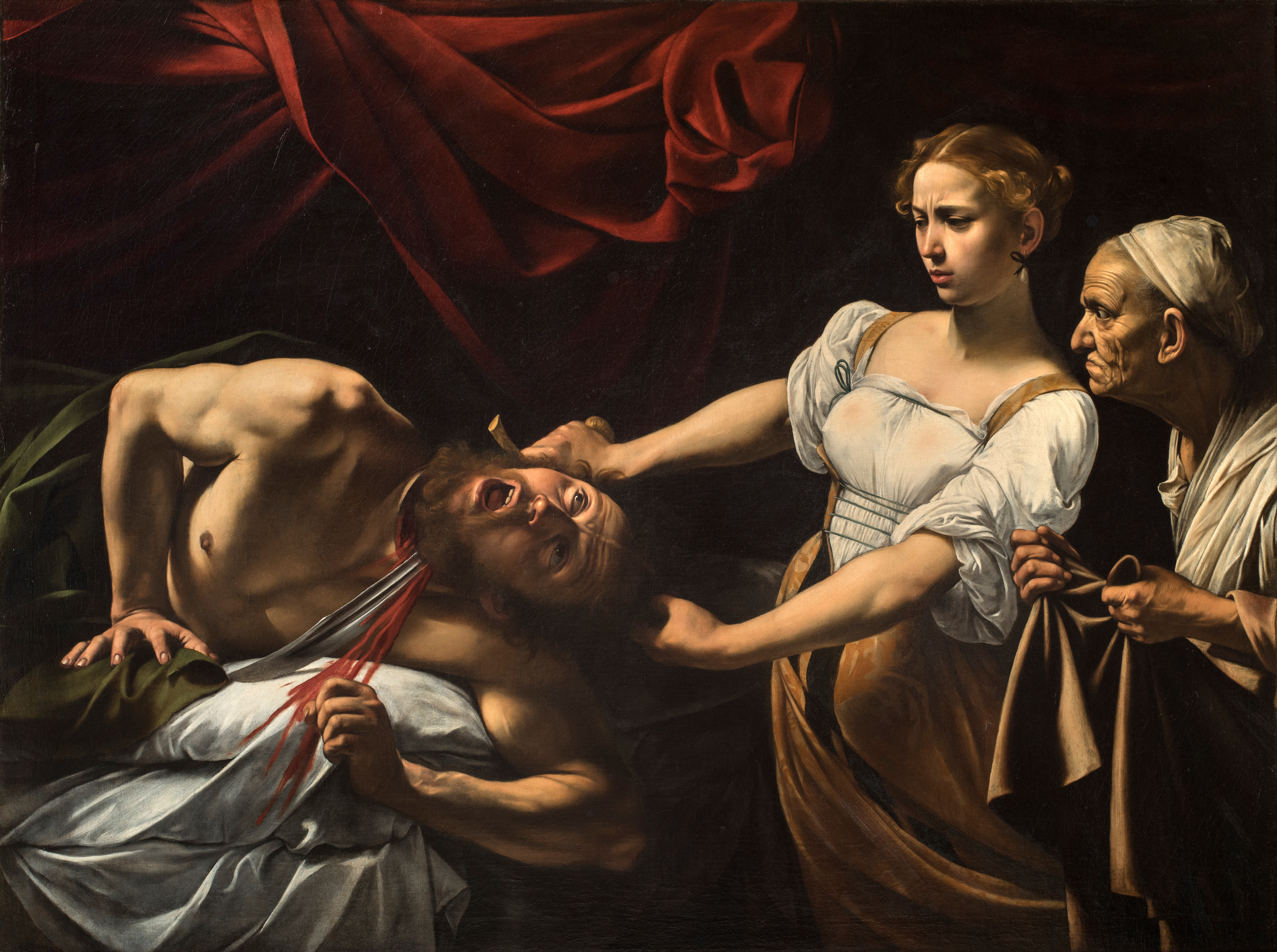
Michelangelo Merisi da Caravaggio, Judith Beheading Holofernes, c.1599. Oil on canvas; 145x195 cm, Galleria Nazionale d'Arte Antica di Palazzo Barberini, Rome

=== Baroque ===
Judith beheading Holofernes was a very popular story amongst Baroque artists. Artemisia Gentileschi's contemporary Johann Liss stayed abreast with the Baroque style by including macabre imagery in his painting, Judith in the Tent of Holofernes. The painting shows the headless body of Holofernes slumping over. Judith sweeps Holofernes's head into a basket showing a look of swiftness about her. The viewer can see the maidservant's head in the background while the rest of her body is unseen. She seems eager to see what directions Judith will give her next. The decapitated body of Holofernes has blood gushing out of it, showing Liss's interest in the human body. Gentileschi has a similar urgency in her painting but shows Judith in mid-decapitation rather than showing Holofernes headless body. Gentileschi also uses the same amount of bloodiness in her painting.

==== Caravaggio Influence ====
Caravaggio's Judith Beheading Holofernes shows a different portrayal of this scene. Mary Gerrard points out that Caravaggio "reintroduced a narrative emphasis, but focusing now upon the dramatic rather than the epic features of the story and upon the human conflict between the two principal characters". Caravaggio shows Holofernes holding the blood coming from his neck like a string. Rather than making the scene of Holofernes's beheading more palatable for the viewers, Gentileschi differs by not holding back the gruesome imagery. Gentileschi also shows Judith putting her full efforts into the slaying, even by employing her maidservant. In both Caravaggio and Gentileschi's paintings, there is a notable absence of detail in the background.

Judith beheading Holofernes has been depicted by a number of artists including Giorgione, Titian, Rembrandt, Peter Paul Rubens and Caravaggio.

Caravaggio's Judith Beheading Holofernes is believed to be the main inspiration of Gentileschi's work, and his influence shows in the naturalism and violence she brings to her canvas.

==== Related paintings by Artemisia Gentileschi ====
Gentileschi painted another painting, Judith and her Maidservant (1613–14), which shows Judith holding a dagger while her maidservant carries a basket containing a severed head. Judith and her Maidservant is displayed in the Palazzo Pitti, in Florence. A further three paintings by Gentileschi, in Naples, Detroit and Cannes, show her maid covering the head of Holofernes, while Judith herself looks out the frame of the picture. Gentileschi's father and fellow painter, Orazio Gentileschi was also very much influenced by Caravaggio's style and painted his own version of the tale, Judith and Her Maidservant with the Head of Holofernes.

== Historiography ==
There have been many different interpretations and viewpoints on Judith Slaying Holofernes by art historians and biographers alike. Art historian Mary Garrard believes that Judith Slaying Holofernes portrays Judith as a "socially liberated woman who punishes masculine wrongdoing". Although the painting depicts a scene from the Bible, art historians have suggested that Gentileschi drew herself as Judith and her mentor Agostino Tassi, who was tried for and convicted of her rape, as Holofernes. Gentileschi's biographer Mary Garrard famously proposed an autobiographical reading of the painting, stating that it functions as "a cathartic expression of the artist's private, and perhaps repressed, rage". Griselda Pollock suggests that the painting should be "read less in terms of its overt references to Artemisia’s experience than as an encoding of the artist's sublimated responses to events in her life and the historical context in which she worked." British art historian, Marcia Pointon, explores how Gentileschi uses chiaroscuro to add tension to the scene, symbolizing Judith's power during this act of violence which, in turn, adds emotional and moral complexity to the piece. She also emphasizes how the act of decapitation symbolizes not only female empowerment but is also a direct challenge to the patriarchal authority. More recent discussion of the painting has moved away from too close a relationship to the rape of Gentileschi; rather it has focussed on Gentileschi's determination to paint strong women who are the centre of the action.

== Reception ==
The Florentine biographer Filippo Baldinucci described Judith Slaying Holofernes as “inspiring no little amount of terror.” The painting was at times noted for its dramatic and violent subject matter, which contributed to both its attention and its notoriety. Some early viewers also interpreted its impact in relation to the artist’s gender, reflecting broader early modern assumptions about women artists and their ability to depict violent or dramatic scenes.

In the nineteenth century, when the painting was sold by Signora Saveria de Simone in 1827, it was misattributed to Caravaggio, reflecting ongoing confusion between Gentileschi’s style and that of her artistic influences. This misattribution has been discussed by scholars as evidence of Gentileschi’s strong engagement with Caravaggesque style and techniques.

In more recent scholarship, the painting has been reassessed within feminist art historical frameworks. Art historian Eva Straussman-Pflanzer notes that the work has gained particular significance in modern discourse due to its inclusion in feminist interpretations of art history, which emphasize Gentileschi’s representation of active female figures and narrative agency.

== In popular culture ==
In the John Wick's spin-off action thriller Ballerina the painting is hanging above the Director's (Anjelica Huston) office desk.

== See also ==
- List of works by Artemisia Gentileschi
