= Francesco Bocchi =

Italian writer

Francesco Bocchi (1548 – 31 March 1613 or 1618) was an Italian writer of the late Renaissance, active in Florence.

== Biography ==
Bocchi was born and died in Florence. He was the son of Lisabetta Papi and Bartolomeo Bocchi, a moderately well-off couple. Francesco's father died when he was eleven years old, and he was left to be educated in literature and rhetoric by his uncle Donato Bocchi, vicar general of the Bishop of Fiesole. He moves in 1572 to Rome for some years. He returns to Florence, where he finds employment as a tutor for aristocratic children, for example Ulisse Bentivoglio, and the children of Benedetto Vivaldi and Piero Antonio Strozzi. He also found employment in the composition of speeches (such as funeral orations) and treatises targeted to for prominent patrons. Among his patrons was Lorenzo Salviati and his family, Filippo Valori, Piero Vettori, and other members of the Curia in the circle of cardinal and later Grand-Duke, Ferdinando de' Medici.

As a writer, he often elaborated works with courtly erudition, more style than reasoned content, although deep in facts. Among his works was a guide to artwork in Florence: Le bellezze della citta' di Firenze, original 1594. It was the first of its type for an Italian city, and can be compared to Filippo Titi's 1674 version for Rome.

He also wrote a History of the Flemish Rebellions for Giovan Vincenzo Vitelli who wished the celebrate the role of father Chiappino Vitelli, who had fought there as a mercenary. He also wrote a guide to the works of art and architecture in the city of Florence. He was buried in the church of San Pier Maggiore, which was since razed.
