= Judith and Holofernes (studio of Tintoretto) =

Painting by the studio of Tintoretto, formerly attributed to the master

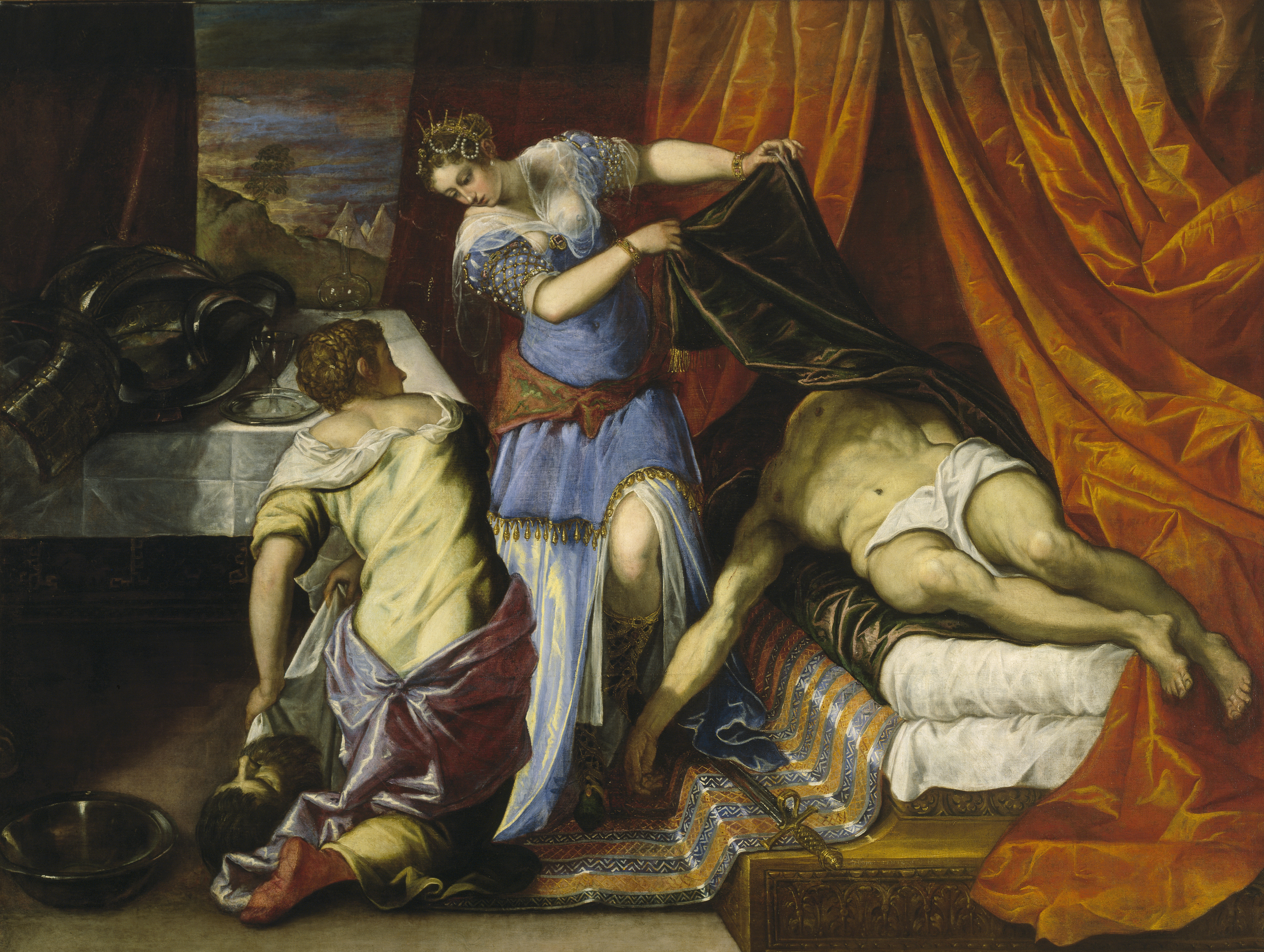
Judith and Holofernes (c. 1577)

Judith and Holofernes is a painting of c. 1577 in oils on canvas by the studio of Jacopo Tintoretto; it was previously considered to be an autograph work from the painter's youth. Previously owned by the Marquis of La Ensenada, it entered the Spanish royal collection in 1760 and is now in the Museo del Prado.
