= Judith and Her Maidservant (Artemisia Gentileschi, Detroit) =

Painting by Artemisia Gentileschi

Judith and Maidservant with Head of Holofernes
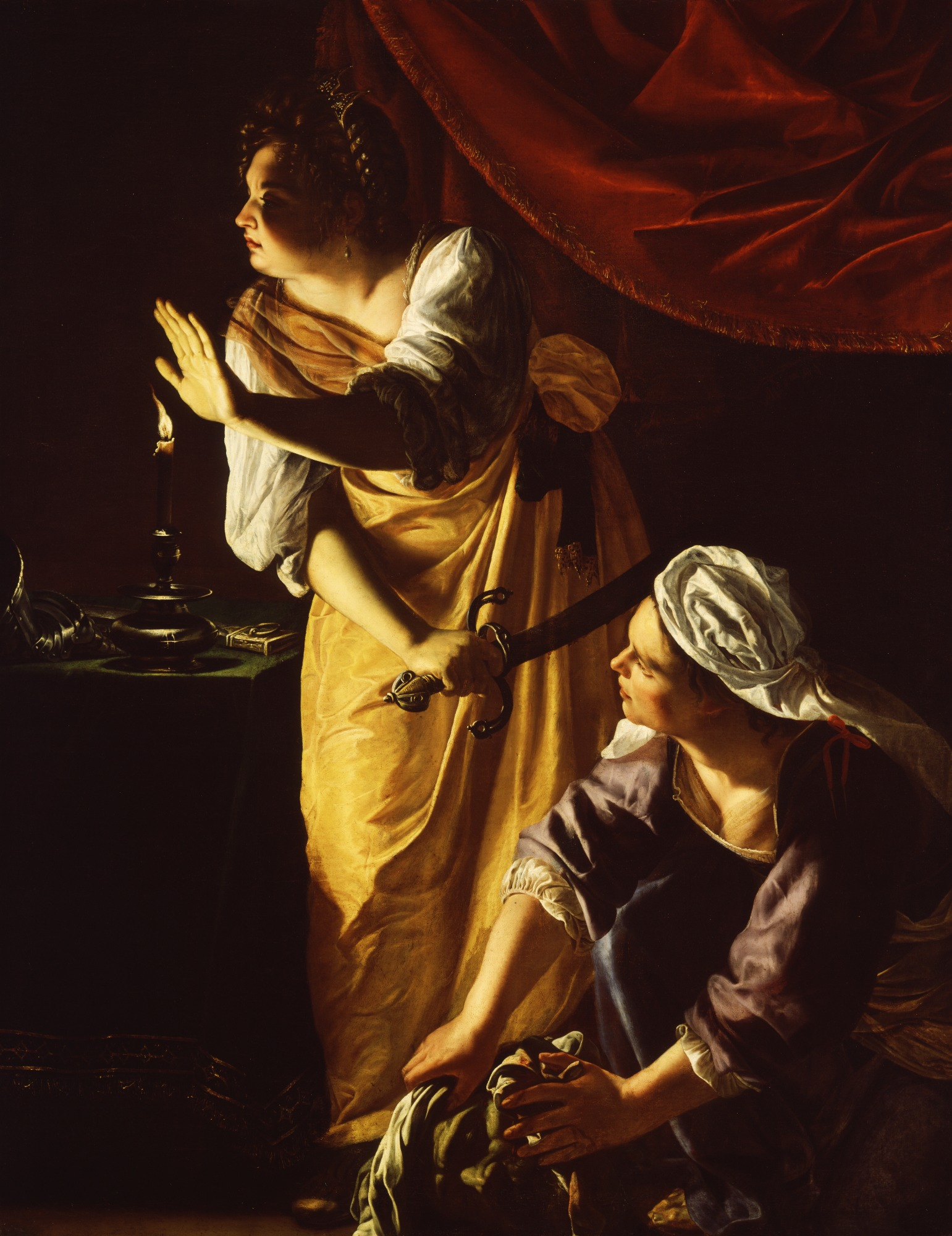
- Artist: Artemisia Gentileschi
- Year: c. 1623–1625
- Medium: oil paint, canvas
- Dimensions: 187.2 cm (73.7 in) × 142 cm (56 in)
- Accession: 52.253

Judith and Her Maidservant is one of four paintings by the Italian baroque artist Artemisia Gentileschi that depicts the biblical story of Judith and Holofernes. This particular work, executed in about 1623 to 1625, now hangs in the Detroit Institute of Arts. The narrative is taken from the deuterocanonical Book of Judith, in which Judith seduces and then murders the general Holofernes. This precise moment illustrates the maidservant Abra wrapping the severed head in a bag, moments after the murder, while Judith keeps watch. The other three paintings are now shown in the Museo di Capodimonte in Naples, the Palazzo Pitti in Florence, and the Musée de la Castre in Cannes.

The 2001 exhibition catalogue on Artemisia Gentileschi and her father Orazio remarked that "the painting is generally recognized as Artemisia's finest work". Others have concurred, and the art historian Letizia Treves concluded that, with this painting, "Artemisia rightly takes her place among the leading artists of the Italian Baroque."

== Provenance ==
The painting was in possession of Prince Brancaccio in 1952, where it was co-owned by Alessandro Morandotti of Rome, Italy, and Adolph Loewi of New York. The whereabouts of ownership before this time are unknown. It was then purchased by Leslie H. Green in the same year 1952 and gifted to the Detroit Institute of Arts in Michigan.

== Dating and attribution ==
This painting is attributed to Artemisia due to her adoption of Caravaggesque technique and composition. Despite following the works of their contemporary Caravaggio, Artemisia and her father developed their own independent styles. The explicit nature of the artist's interpretation has led writers to believe that there is a deeper meaning behind Artemisia's Judith, drawing back to the rape trial against Agostino Tassi. Identification with the protagonist of the painting is also believed to be an indicator of ownership. The precise date of execution is up for debate, since Artemisia had been traveling around Italy at this time.

The painting (and frame) underwent cleaning and restoration in 2020–2021.

== Artistic background ==
Gentileschi was trained to compose still life paintings and portraits, which was common for female artists of the time. Apart from this, she also developed an interest in historical compositions that derived from both biblical and mythological stories. Women artists were limited to particular categories of art to paint from because they were deemed appropriate by societal expectations of the era. Gentileschi was educated by her father, among other artists, to produce these portraits, still lifes, and history paintings. It was frowned upon for women to study the anatomical structures of nude models, especially as a virtuous unmarried woman. Susan Dixon notes that historians have analyzed Gentileschi's works that emphasize the naked female form, building on the idea that the female artist may have used her own body as a reference in the mirror. It has been considered that the gender-based limitations of her Roman hometown, along with the absence of a mother for the majority of her life, assisted in Gentileschi's interest and focus on powerful female figures.

Speculation from Elizabeth Cropper asserts that Gentileschi painted the feminine figures in a more heroic lighting, attributing characteristics of tragedy and sadness to these women, while also justifying their actions from an ethical standpoint. This representation of women in positions of power communicated Gentileschi's endorsement of female strength and potential. To the knowledge of historians, Gentileschi's patrons were all male. According to a string of Venetian poems that were sent to Gentileschi in 1627, those that followed the artist and purchased her work did so because she was female. Even though her figures were painted in the nude, contemporary critics expressed that there was more of a sensual wonder related to her womanly traits as an artist.

After practicing and honing her artistic abilities for only three years, Gentileschi's father Orazio described his daughter's talent as having superseded the level of the masters. Others who were very close to her, like academician Joachim von Sandrart, commended her work from which exuded "knowledge and rationality", traits that were not normally connected to women of the time.

== Visual analysis ==
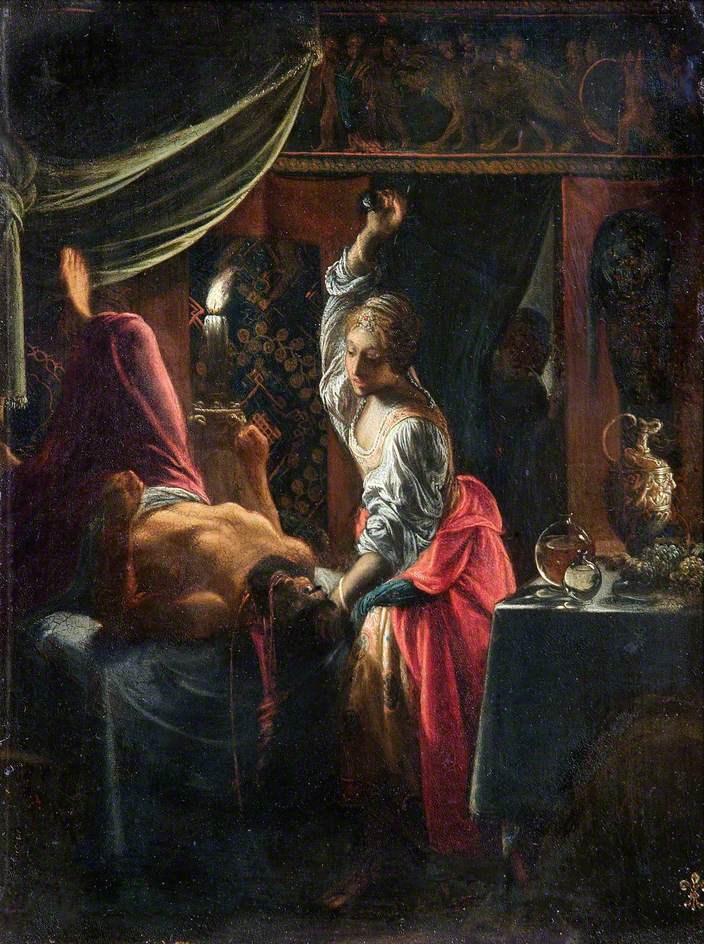
Judith Slaying Holofernes by Adam Elsheimer, c.1601–1603

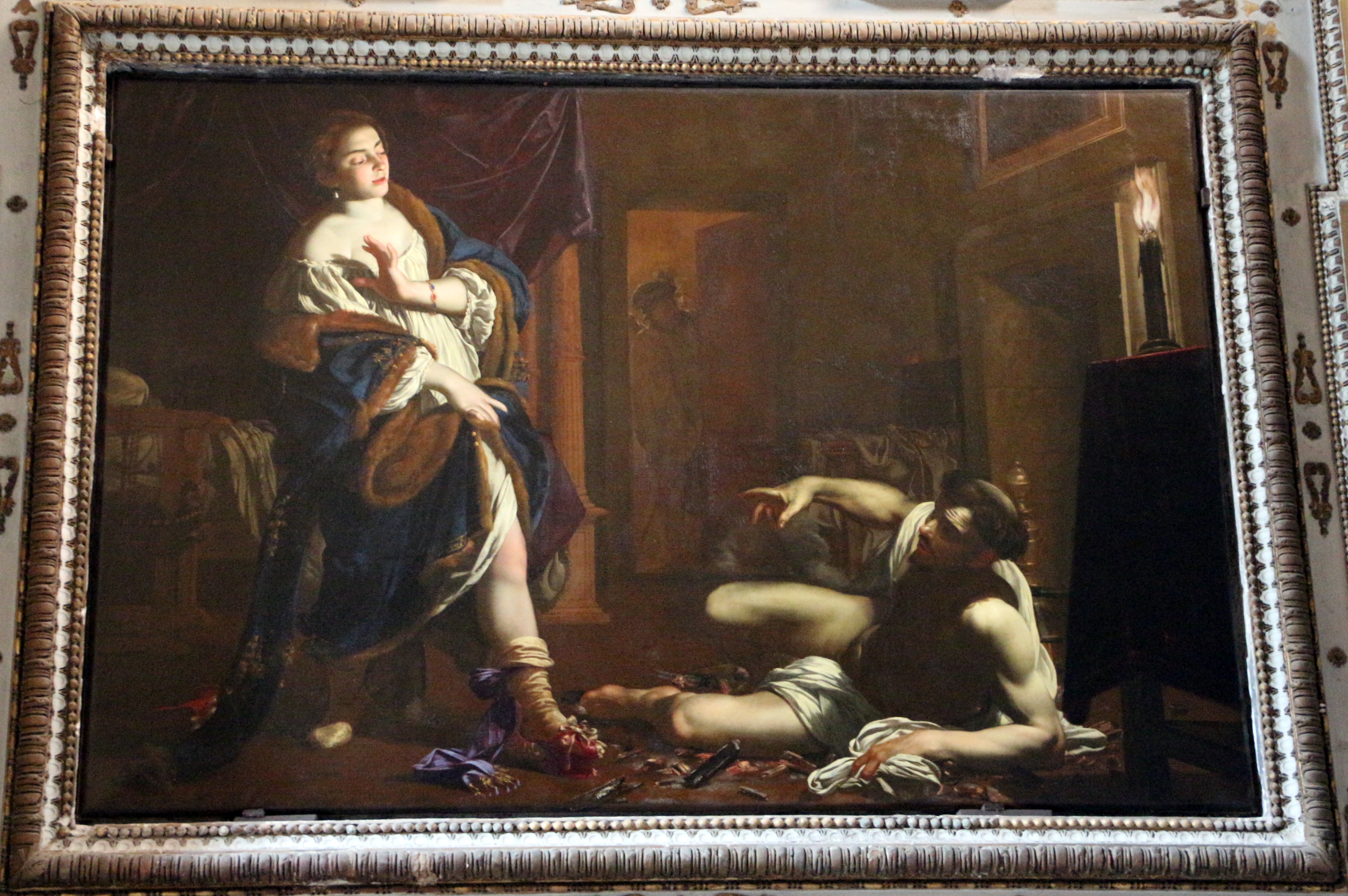
The Temptation of St. Francis by Simon Vouet, 1624

Much like her father, Gentileschi's style in the formative years of her career followed that of Caravaggio, mirroring his methods of dark shadows and overall execution. The artist utilized dramatic forms of chiaroscuro, most notably across Judith's half-lit face, her hand shielding the glow of the candle. Jesse M. Locker expresses this particular painting's definitive qualities that quintessentially represent the dramatization within baroque art. Vivid tones of color, ranging from Judith's golden dress to the deep crimson curtain, contribute to an elemental component that is unique to Gentileschi's style, unlike Caravaggio. The shadow cast on Judith's face resembles a crescent moon which is a symbol of Artemis, a reoccurring connection the artist made between the female figures. Artemisia's Judith is always seen with a weapon at the ready.

Gentileschi painted the figures and components of the composition with a strong sense of realism. Art historian Mary Garrard attributes this detailed attention to the influence of the Caravaggesque style. The dramatic lighting, playing with the limited glow from the candle and dense shadows, builds tension in the scene. The style of this composition is compared to Adam Elsheimer's Judith Slaying Holofernes, with the tenebristic lighting from the single candle and the drapery at the top corner of the canvas. The dramatically shadowed crossing of Judith's arms connects to the manner and style of Simon Vouet's Temptation of St. Francis, along with the theme of sexual power. There is still much debate over the specific date in which this painting was created, however most scholars secure it within the mid-1620s.

=== Story of Judith and Holofernes ===
This Jewish narrative begins with the attempted siege of Bethulia, an Israelite city, by the Assyrian army, conquering their way to Jerusalem. Judith, a widow living in Bethulia, offers herself up in order to combat the surrender of her people. Accompanied by her maidservant Abra, Judith accepts an invitation to a secluded feast from the Assyrian general Holofernes. His desire to lie with Judith, upon donning her finest garments, along with the large consumption of alcohol ultimately lead to his demise. Once asleep in his bed chamber, Judith arms herself and has Abra keep watch outside. The Hebrew heroine beheads Holofernes and brings the severed head to her people, where they rejoice over her victory. News travels through the ranks of Holofernes' death, leading to the Assyrian army's defeat at the hands of the Bethulians.

== History of Judith in art ==
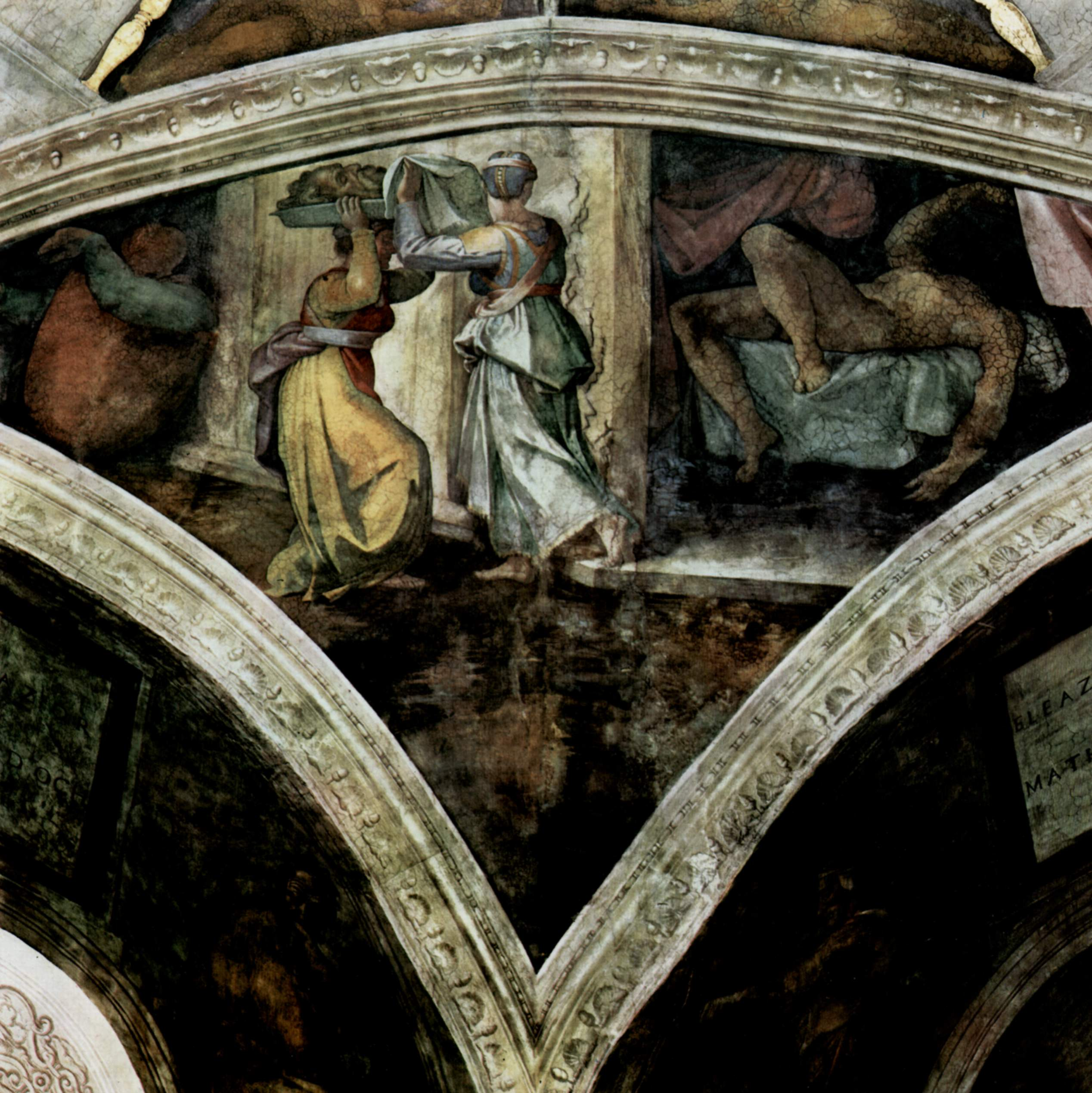
Pendentive – Judith and Holofernes by Michelangelo, 1509

The notion of Judith's attempt at seducing Holofernes was not something the early Christian Church deemed appropriate. Religious interpretations instead relayed that God enhanced her beauty without interfering with her innocence as a woman, which led to the increased imagery that connected her to the Virgin Mary. In the Middle Ages, Judith was often cast in the same light as the Virgin, comparing their similar triumphs of beheading characters that represented evil—Holofernes and the devil, respectively.

Steering away from an all-encompassing approach to story-telling, Renaissance art marked the beginning of focusing entirely on the suspenseful moments of Judith's tale, particularly when Holofernes is beheaded. A prime example of this is Michelangelo's pendentive of Judith in the Sistine Chapel. Mythological symbols have been implemented in the decoration of Judith's armor, referencing the female war/hunting figures of Artemis, Athena and the Amazons. Donatello is most well-known for this application, but the tradition is connected to other artists, like Sandro Botticelli, Michelangelo, Andrea Mantegna, Giorgio Vasari, Caravaggio, and Artemisia Gentileschi. It is speculated by art historian Mary Garrard that Judith served as a righteous symbol from which people in the sixteenth and seventeenth centuries looked to in religious and political situations. During the Counter-Reformation, Catholics saw Judith's conquest of Holofernes as their battle and victory over Protestantism, specifically Truth over Heresy.

== Interpretations ==
Women depicted in these biblical times traditionally wore sandals or were barefoot, as opposed to Judith's attire in this painting. Judith, being clad in armor with heavy shoes—typically seen on a warrior or a member of the military—alters the perception of power coming from a source that is usually associated with the sensuous form. Art historians Keith Christiansen and Judith Walker argue that the gauntlet in her hand aims to emphasize the symbolic act of a military champion's defeat and loss of power. This notion is also addressed in regards to Judith, a young widowed woman, being the one to strip Holofernes of his heroic attributes. Holofernes' attraction to Judith, which ultimately leads to a calamitous case of deception and violence, almost mirrors the events of Gentileschi's own life. The symbolic nature and personification of the characters in the biblical story, however, are opposite to the true proceedings of the artist. Art historian E. P. Richardson points out that this painting might serve as somewhat of a self-portrait, as Judith's maidservant possesses physical qualities that match those of Gentileschi, herself. From the analysis of Diane Apostolos-Cappadona, the interpretation of Judith under Artemisia serves as an indicator of the female hero no longer painted in the righteous light of God.

=== Mary Garrard ===
In her book, Artemisia Gentileschi: The Image of the Female Hero in Italian Baroque Art, art historian Mary D. Garrard notes that Gentileschi's depiction of female figures places them in a more heroic lighting. Garrard notes the symbolism that writers have attributed to Judith beheading Holofernes, believing it to be Artemisia's version of retaliation from her personal life. The aftermath of the rape trial involving her father's friend Agostino Tassi, as well as the opinions of those that challenged her virtue, may have influenced her style and content. Having said this, Garrard believes the meaning behind Gentileschi and Judith is much more complex. This inclusion of self-portraiture was common among a wide range of artists, like Titian, Michelangelo, and even Caravaggio.

Garrard infers that men feared Gentileschi's series of Judith beheading Holofernes because it brought to life the notion of a woman taking control and ruling over a man. The author analyzes that Artemisia may have also integrated some characteristics of herself into Judith's maidservant, Abra, whose supportive appearance diverges from the unfaithfulness of Gentileschi's former friend, Tuzia. Garrard concludes that the symbolic differences between Judith and Abra connect to the past and present iterations of the artist, herself. Through this, Gentileschi painted a more complex description of the biblical heroine and her loyal companion, in order to, in Garrard's mind, break them free from confining stereotypes.

== See also ==
- List of works by Artemisia Gentileschi
