= Lucretia (Artemisia Gentileschi, Los Angeles) =

Painting by Artemisia Gentileschi

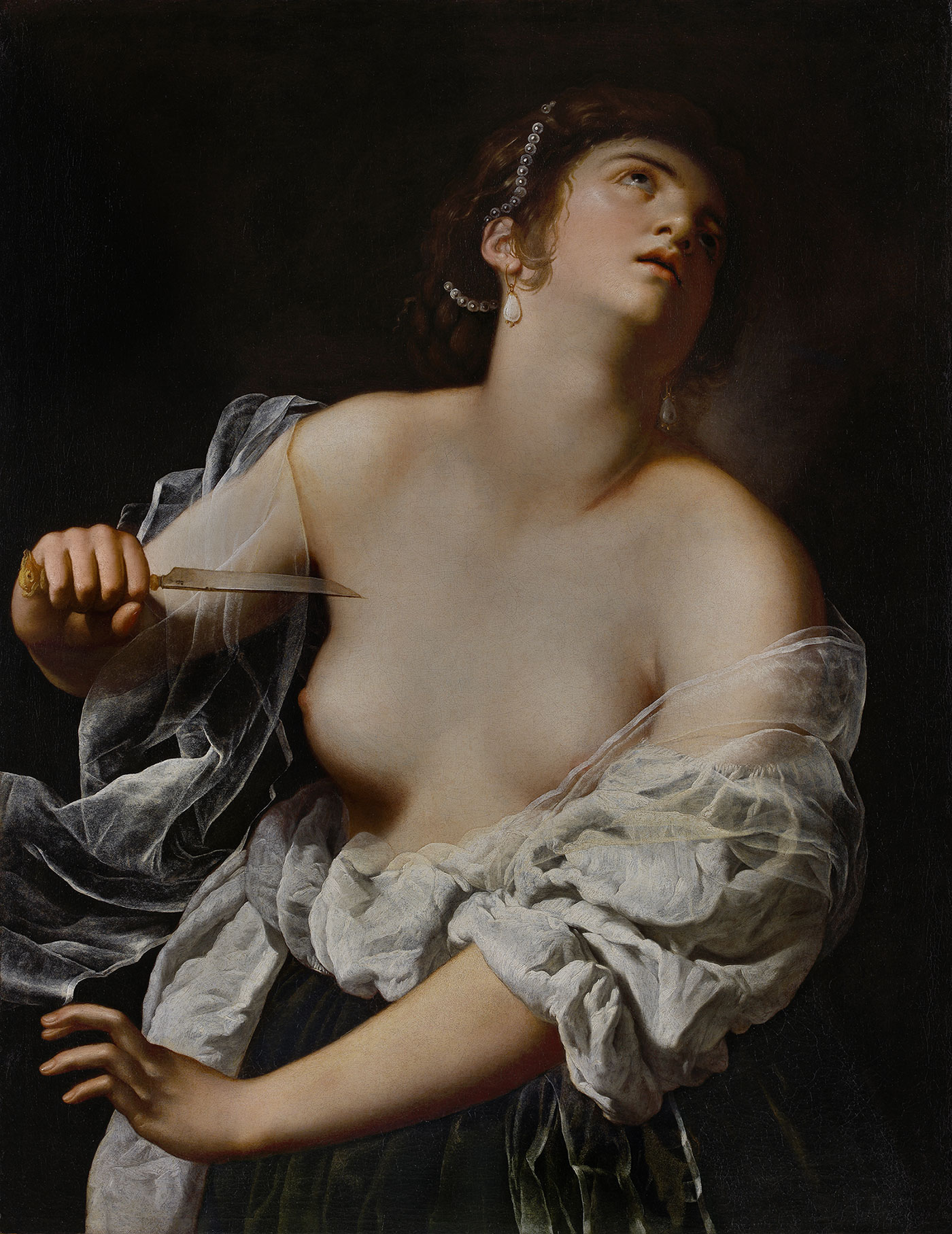
- Artist: Artemisia Gentileschi
- Year: c. 1627
- Medium: Oil on canvas
- Dimensions: 92.9 cm × 72.7 cm (36.6 in × 28.6 in)
- Location: The J. Paul Getty Museum, Los Angeles

Lucretia is a painting by the seventeenth-century Italian artist Artemisia Gentileschi. It is one of three paintings that Gentileschi painted of Lucretia, the wife of Roman consul and general Tarquinus, at the moment of her suicide. The other two versions are in a private collection in Milan (painted a few years before the Getty version) and Potsdam, whilst a work in the Museo di Capodimonte in Naples of the same subject previously attributed to Gentileschi is now attributed by its owner to Massimo Stanzione.

== Provenance ==
The painting is believed to date to Artemisia's stay in Venice in the late 1620s. A set of poems written by Giovanni Francesco Loredan in 1627 are believed to refer to this work. Its history is undocumented until its identification in a private collection in Cannes in the 1980s. The painting was acquired by the Getty Museum in 2021. The price paid by the Getty is unknown but the painting sold in 2019 for a record US$5.3m.

== See also ==
- List of works by Artemisia Gentileschi
