= List of works by Artemisia Gentileschi =

The following is an incomplete list of works by Artemisia Gentileschi. Catalogue numbers abbreviated "WB" are taken from the 1999 publication by Raymond Ward Bissell, and number abbreviated "MET" are from the 2001 publication by the Metropolitan Museum of Art. Other attributions are taken from Jesse Locker's The Language of Painting. Further references are available on the Bibliography on Artemisia Gentileschi.

image	name	year	collection	dimensions	inventory nr.	catalogue code
	Susanna and the Elders	1610–1611	Schloss Weißenstein	170 x 119 cm.	191	MET (51), WB (2)
	Madonna and Child	1610–1611	Galleria Spada	116.5 X 86.5 cm.	166	MET (52), WB (X-19)
	Cleopatra	1611–1612	Private Collection	118 x 181 cm.		MET (53), WB (X-6)
	Judith Slaying Holofernes	1611–1612	Museo Nazionale di Capodimonte	158.8 x 125.5 cm.		MET (55), WB (4)
	Danae	1612	Saint Louis Art Museum	40.5 X 52.5 cm.	93:1986	MET (54), WB (X-7)
	Portrait of a Nun	1613–1618	Private Collection	70 × 52.5 cm.		MET (Figure 114.)
	Allegory of Inclination	1615	Casa Buonarroti	152 × 61 cm.		MET (Figure 110.), WB (8)
	Self-Portrait as a Female Martyr	c. 1615	Private Collection	32 X 24.7 cm.		MET (56), WB (7)
	Self-Portrait as Saint Catherine of Alexandria	1615–1617	National Gallery, London	71.5 cm x 71 cm	NG6671	
	Self-Portrait as a Lute Player	1616–1618	Wadsworth Atheneum; Villa Medici	30 x 28 cm		MET (57)
	Mary Magdalene	1616–1617	Palazzo Pitti, Florence	146.5 x 108 cm		MET (58), WB (10)
	Saint Catherine of Alexandria	c. 1618–1619	Uffizi The National Gallery	77 x 62 cm	8032	MET (59), WB (6)
	Judith and her Maidservant	c. 1618–1619	Palazzo Pitti, Florence	14 x 93.5 cm		MET (60), WB (5)
	Allegory of Painting	1620s	Musée de Tessé, Le Mans	95.5 x 133 cm		MET (64)
	Mary Magdalene as Melancholy	1620s	Museo Soumaya	136.3 × 100.3 cm.		MET (Figure 128.), WB (17)
	Saint Cecilia	c. 1620	Galleria Spada	108 X 78.5 cm.		MET (63), WB (X-28)
	Mary Magdalene in Ecstasy	1620	National Gallery of Art	81 x 105 cm cm.		G. Pupi
	Jael and Sisera	1620	Museum of Fine Arts, Budapest	86 X 125 cm.		MET (61), WB (11)
	Judith Slaying Holofernes	1620–1621	Uffizi	86 X 125 cm.		MET (62), WB (12)
	Susanna and the Elders	1622	Burghley House	162.5 x 121.9 cm.		MET (65), WB (X-42)
	Portrait of a Gonfaloniere	1622	Palazzo d'Accursio	208 x 128 cm.		MET (66), WB (13)
	Lucretia	c. 1623–1625	Collection Gerolamo Etro, Milan	54 x 51 cm.		MET (67), WB (3)
	Christ Blessing the Children	c. 1624–1625	Church of Sant'Ambrogio e Carlo al Corso, Rome	134.6 × 97.7 cm.		MET (Figure 132.)
	Penitent Magdalene	c. 1625–1626	Seville Cathedral	122 x 96 cm.		MET (68), WB (16)
	Judith and Maidservant with Head of Holofernes	c. 1625–1627	Detroit Institute of Arts	182.2 X 142.2 cm.	52.253	MET (69), WB (14)
	Lucretia	1627	J. Paul Getty Museum	92.9 x 72.7 cm.	2021.14	
	Venus and Cupid	c. 1625–1630	Virginia Museum of Fine Arts	94 x 144 cm.	2001.225	MET (70), WB (18)
	Aurora	1625–1627	Private Collection	218 x 146 cm.		MET (Figure 96.), WB (15)
	Esther before Ahasuerus	c. 1628–1635	Metropolitan Museum of Art	208.3 × 273.7 cm.	69.281	MET (71), WB (28)
	Allegory of Painting	1630s	Private Collection			MET (Figure 97.)
	Penitent Magdalene	1630s	Private Collection	49 x 39.7 cm.		MET (Figure 98.)
	Madonna and Child	c. 1630	Palazzo Pitti, Florence	118 x 86 cm.	2129	MET (Figure 107.), WB (1)
	Susanna and the Elders	c. 1630	Nottingham Castle	162.5 x 121.9 cm.	NCM 1964–77	MET (65 (related pictures: Nottingham))
	Annunciation	1630	Museo Nazionale di Capodimonte	257 x 179 cm.	Q375	MET (72), WB (24)
	Penitent Magdalene	c. 1630–1632	Private Collection	65.7 x 50.8 cm.		MET (73), WB (9)
	The Sleeping Christ Child	1630–1632	Museum of Fine Arts, Boston	12.4 × 17.5 cm	2022.102	
	Saint Catherine of Alexandria	c. 1627–1635	Nationalmuseum, Stockholm	90 x 75.4 cm.	NM 7538	
	Corisca and the Satyr	c. 1630–1635	Private Collection	155 x 210 cm.		MET (74), WB (30)
	Self Portrait	c. 1630–1635	Palazzo Barberini, Rome	98 x 74.5 cm	1952 (F.N. 33598)	Locker (Figure 5.2)
	Samson and Delilah	1630–1638	Palazzo Zevallos, Naples			WB (35)
	Clio: the Muse of History	1632	Palazzo Blu	127.6 x 97.2 cm.		MET (75), WB (27)
	Cleopatra	c. 1633–1635	Private Collection	117 x 175.5 cm.		MET (76), WB (22)
	Nativity of St. John the Baptist	c. 1633–1635	Museo del Prado	184 X 158 cm.	P00149	MET (77), WB (32)
	Lot and his Daughters	c. 1635–1638	Toledo Museum of Art	230.5 x 183 cm.	1983.107	MET (78), WB (39)
	The Martyrdom of St Januarius in the Amphitheatre at Pozzuoli	c. 1636–1637	Museo Nazionale di Capodimonte	300 x 200 cm.		MET (79), WB (33b)
	Adoration of the Magi	c. 1636–1637	Museo Nazionale di Capodimonte	300 × 180 cm.		MET (Figure 142.), WB (33c)
	Saint Proculus of Pozzuoli and his mother Santa Nicaea	c. 1636–1637	Museo Nazionale di Capodimonte	300 × 180 cm.		MET (Figure 143.), WB (33a)
	David and Bathsheba	c. 1636–1638	Columbus Museum of Art	265.4 x 209.6 cm.	1967.006	MET (80), WB (37)
	Bathsheba	1638	Private Collection			MET (80 (related pictures: formerly Ramunni, Naples, ex-Leipzig)), WB (40)
	Self-Portrait as the Allegory of Painting	c. 1638–1639	Royal Collection, Windsor Castle	96.5 x 73.7 cm.	RCIN 405551	MET (81), WB (42)
	Susanna and the Elders	c. 1638–1640	Royal Collection, Windsor Castle	189 x 143 cm.		
	Judith and Maidservant with Head of Holofernes	c. 1640s	Museo di Capodimonte, Naples	272 X 221 cm.	Q377	MET (69 (related pictures: Museo di Capodimonte)), WB (48c)
	Judith and her Maidservant (Cannes)	c. 1640s	Musée de la Castre, Cannes	235 x 172 cm.	2006.O.751	WB (47), Locker Figure 3.31
	Saint Apollonia	1642–1644	Museo Soumaya	74.3 cm × 57 cm (29.3 in × 22 in)		
	David and Bathsheba	1645	Prussian Palaces and Gardens Foundation Berlin-Brandenburg	265.4 x 209.6 cm.		MET (80 (related pictures: Neues Palais, Potsdam)), WB (48a)
	Lucretia	1645–1650	Neues Palais in Potsdam	261 × 226 cm.		MET (Figure 99.), WB (48b)
	David and Bathsheba	1645	Palazzo Pitti, Florence	286 x 214 cm		MET (80 (related pictures:Palazzo Pitti))
	Bathsheba	1640–1645	Private Collection			MET (80 (related pictures: Haas collection, Vienna)), WB (45)
	Venus Embracing Cupid	1640s	Private Collection	121 x 160 cm.		MET (82), WB (31)
	Susanna and the Elders	1649	Moravian Gallery in Brno	205 x 168 cm		MET (83), WB (50)
	Susanna and the Elders	1650	Bassano Civic Museum	168 × 112 cm		MET (83 (related pictures: Bassano del Grappo)); Locker, Figure 6.1
	Virgin and Child with a Rosary	1651	El Escorial	58 x 50 cm		MET (84), WB (51)
	Susanna and the Elders	1652	Pinacoteca Nazionale di Bologna	200.3 × 225.6 cm		WB (L-104)
