= Madonna and Child (Artemisia Gentileschi) =

Painting by Artemisia Gentileschi

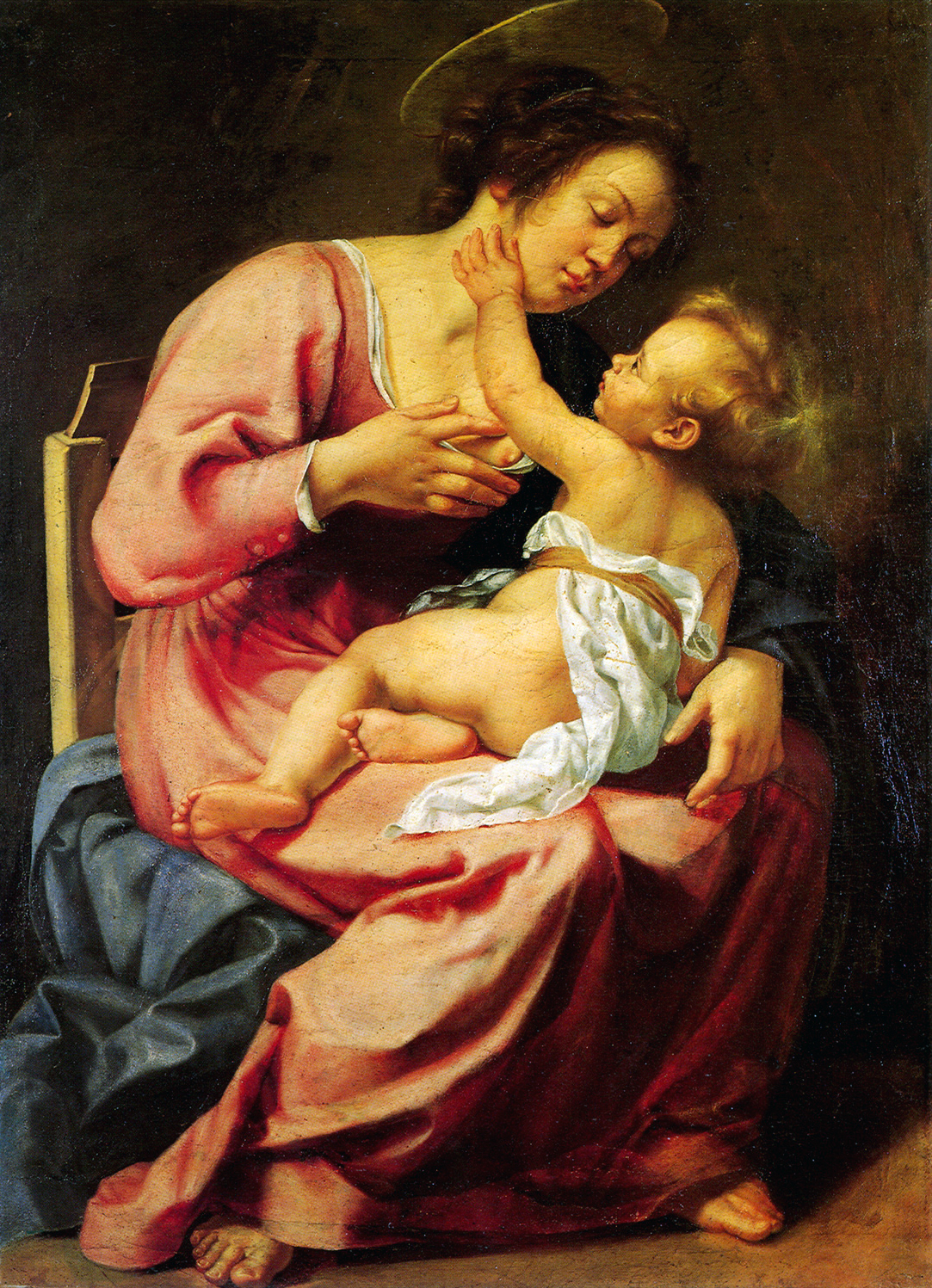
- Artist: Artemisia Gentileschi
- Year: c. 1613–1614
- Medium: Oil on canvas
- Dimensions: 116.5 cm × 86.5 cm (45.9 in × 34.1 in)
- Location: Galleria Spada, Rome

Madonna and Child is an early painting by the baroque painter Artemisia Gentileschi. It was painted around 1613, when Artemisia was around 20 years old. It currently hangs in the Galleria Spada in Rome.

== Description ==
The Virgin Mary is depicted wearing a pink dress sitting on a plain wooden chair, about to nurse her son, as he turns and caresses her face with his left hand. Mary's figure fills the canvas, bringing her close to the viewer, while the Christ child with tousled blonde hair appears to have been modeled on that of a real child.

== History ==
An 1837 engraving of the painting indicates a more complicated arrangement of drapery than is now in evidence. A restoration which took place during 1969–1970 removed a significant amount of retouching and overpaint, which revealed the pink dress with deep maroon shadows as well as the blue mantle.

== Attribution ==
The painting had been attributed to a series of Italian artists until 1992, when archival research uncovered an inventory record from 1637 which brought its history to light. The question of attribution was complicated by the existence of an identically sized Madonna and Child in Palazzo Pitti. The Spada painting however was judged to be "more assured" than the Pitti depiction. Scholars long believed that the Pitti painting was the work of Artemisia, given the depiction of the Madonna as more conventionally beautiful than the Spada painting, which Mary Garrard attributes to historic gender bias.

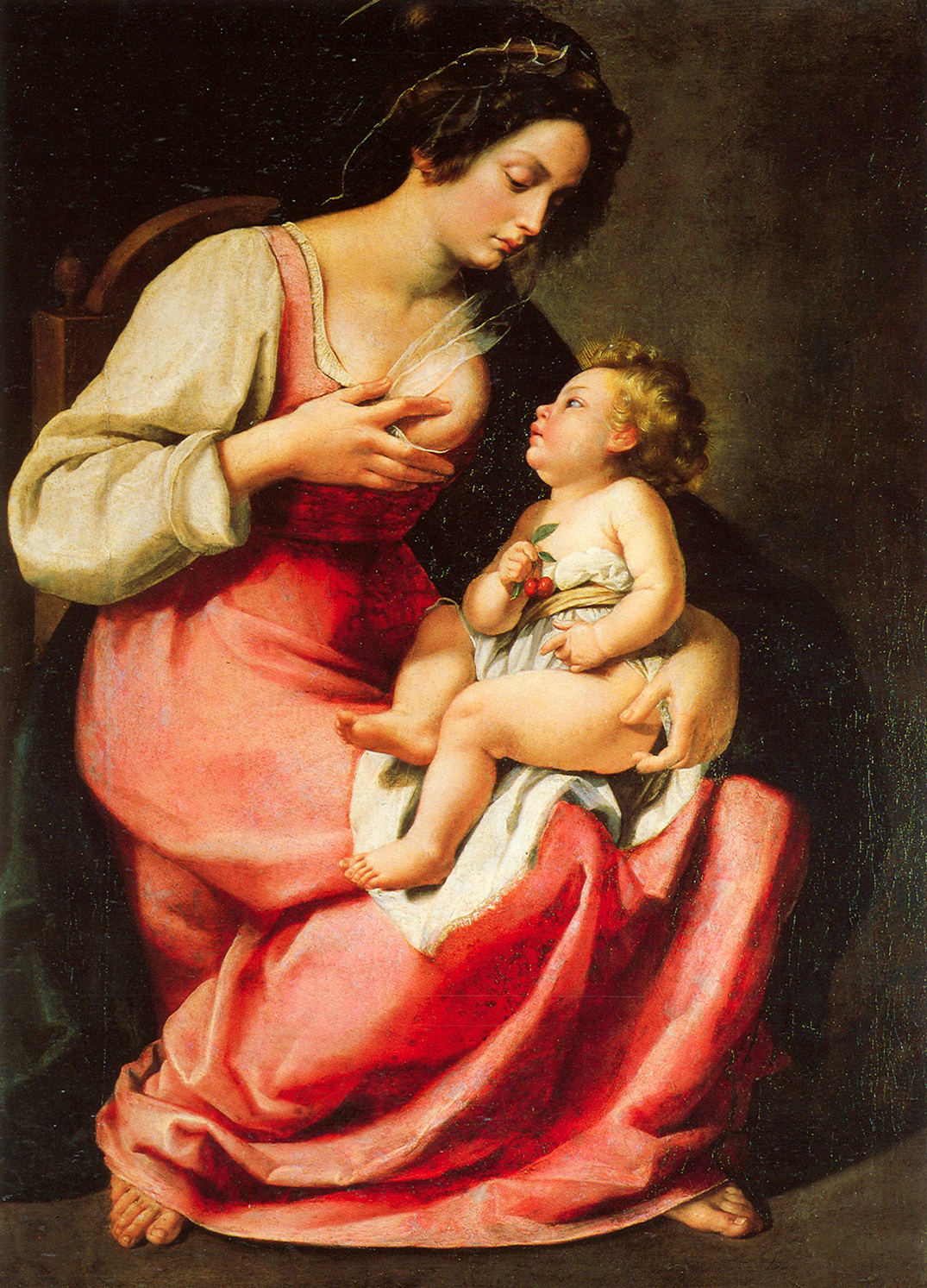
Version in the Palazzo Pitti, Florence

== Provenance ==
An archival document discovered in 1992 records the transfer of art works from Alessandro Biffi to the Veralli family, one member of which, Marchesa Maria Veralli, married Orazio Spada. That transaction also included Saint Cecilia playing the Lute, also by Artemisia.

== See also ==
- List of works by Artemisia Gentileschi
