= Susanna and the Elders (Artemisia Gentileschi, Bologna) =

Painting by Artemisia Gentileschi and Onofrio Palumbo

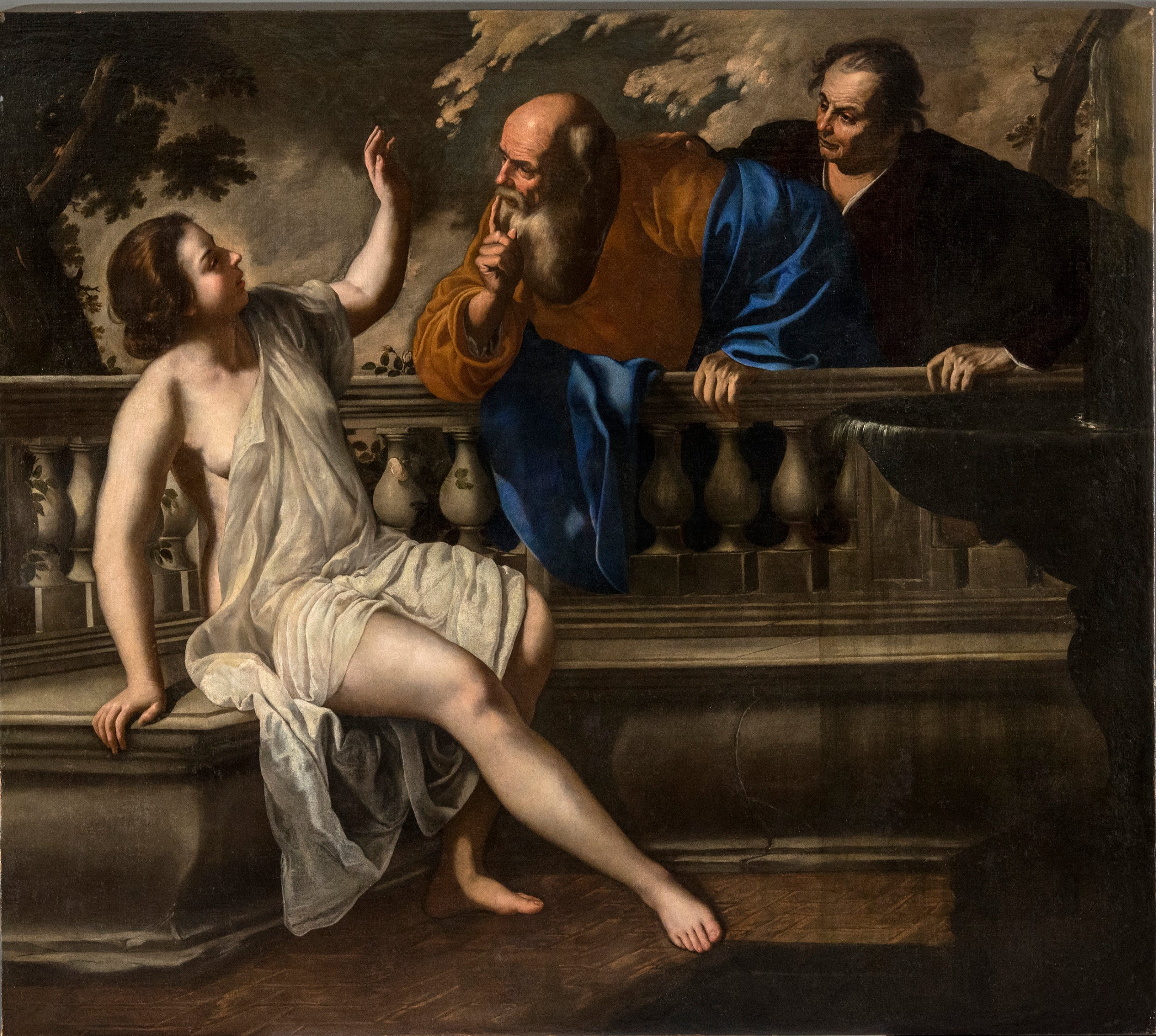
- Artist: Artemisia Gentileschi, Onofrio Palumbo
- Year: 1652
- Medium: Oil on canvas
- Dimensions: 200.3 cm × 225.6 cm (78.9 in × 88.8 in)
- Location: Pinacoteca Nazionale, Bologna

Susanna and the Elders is a 1652 painting by the Italian artist Artemisia Gentileschi. It currently hangs in the Pinacoteca Nazionale, Bologna. The painting, over two metres broad, was completed in collaboration with Gentileschi's pupil Onofrio Palumbo - documents relating to the sale of the painting mention a payment to Palumbo.

It is one of many paintings by Gentileschi that depicts the story of Susanna from the Book of Daniel. Her first was completed when she was seventeen and around the time she was raped by one of her father's students; this particular painting was done when she was approaching sixty years old and is her last known dated work.

== Description ==
The story derives from the biblical book of Daniel, in which a virtuous woman is set upon by two lustful older men. They surprise her while she is bathing and demand that she submit to their lewd intentions, threatening to publicly accuse her if she does not. The theme was commonly used in art from the 16th century and was often used as an opportunity to portray the nude female form. In contrast to the version that Gentileschi painted at the start of her career, this version shows Susannah in a more theatrical pose, deflecting the men's advances rather than shrinking away.

A faint signature and date have been detected on the lower left at the base of the balustrade.

== Provenance ==
Bank records indicate that a version of Susannah was sold to Antonio Galise in early 1653; historians believe it to be this version. It can then be traced to the Medici collection at the Palazzo Medici Riccardi by 1774. By 1945 it was in the Azzolini collection as a work by Elisabetta Sirani, from which it was left to the Italian nation and designated for the regional gallery in Bologna. Recent restoration and investigation have led to the attribution to Gentileschi rather than Sirani.

== Other versions of Susanna by Artemisia Gentileschi ==
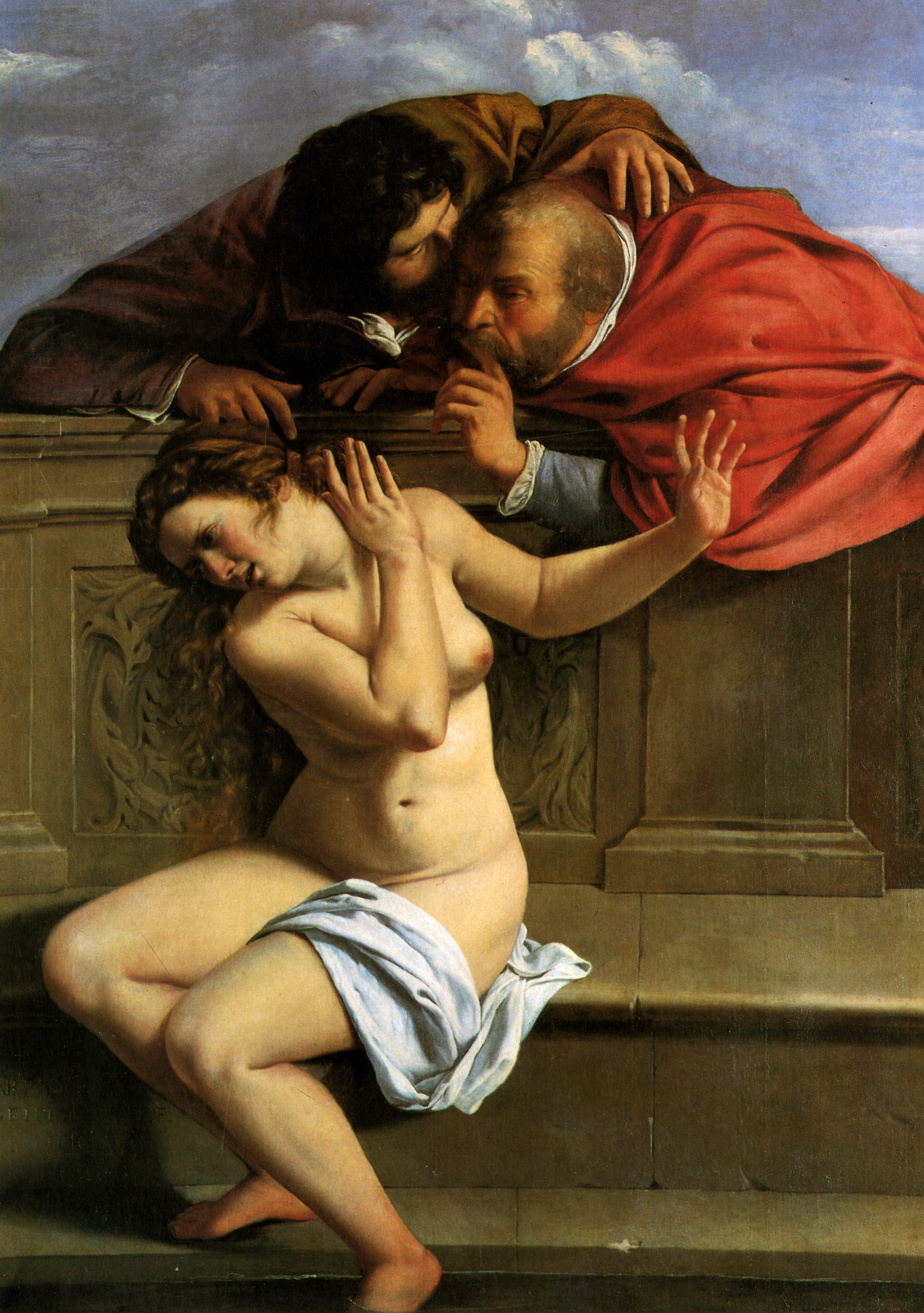
Susanna and the Elders (Artemisia Gentileschi, Pommersfelden)

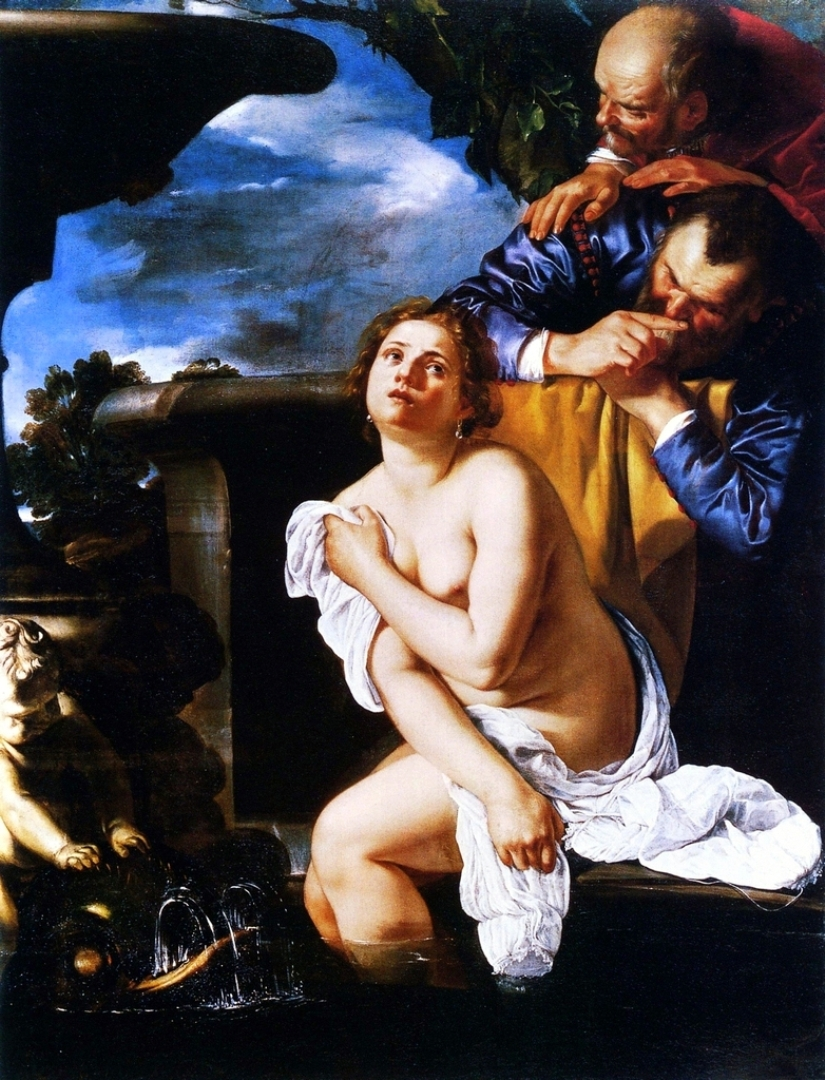
Susanna and the Elders (Gentileschi, Stamford)

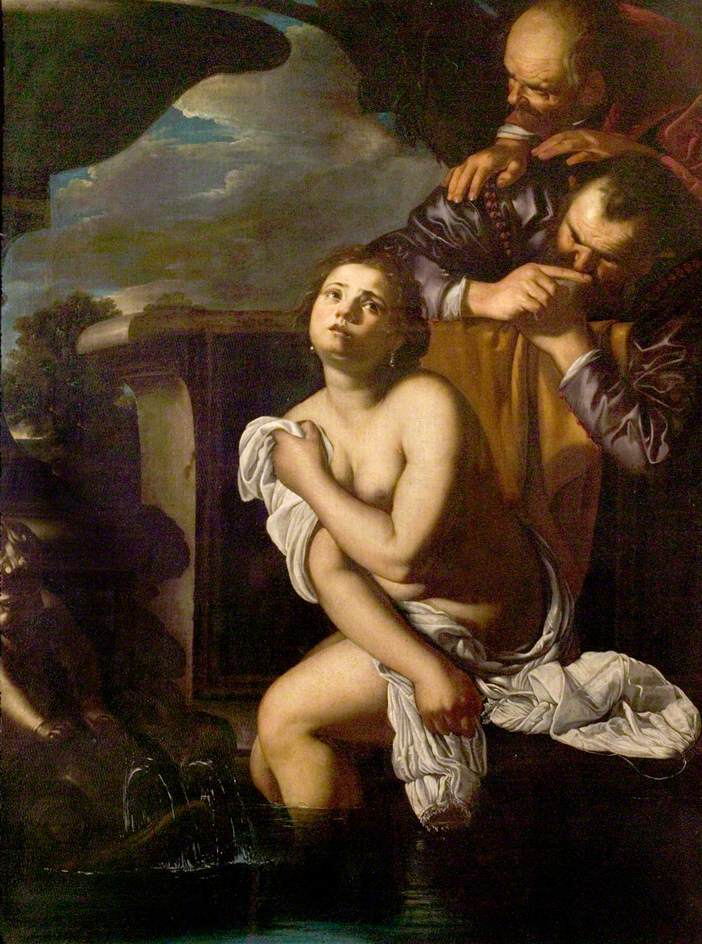
Susanna and the Elders (Artemisia Gentileschi, Nottingham Castle)

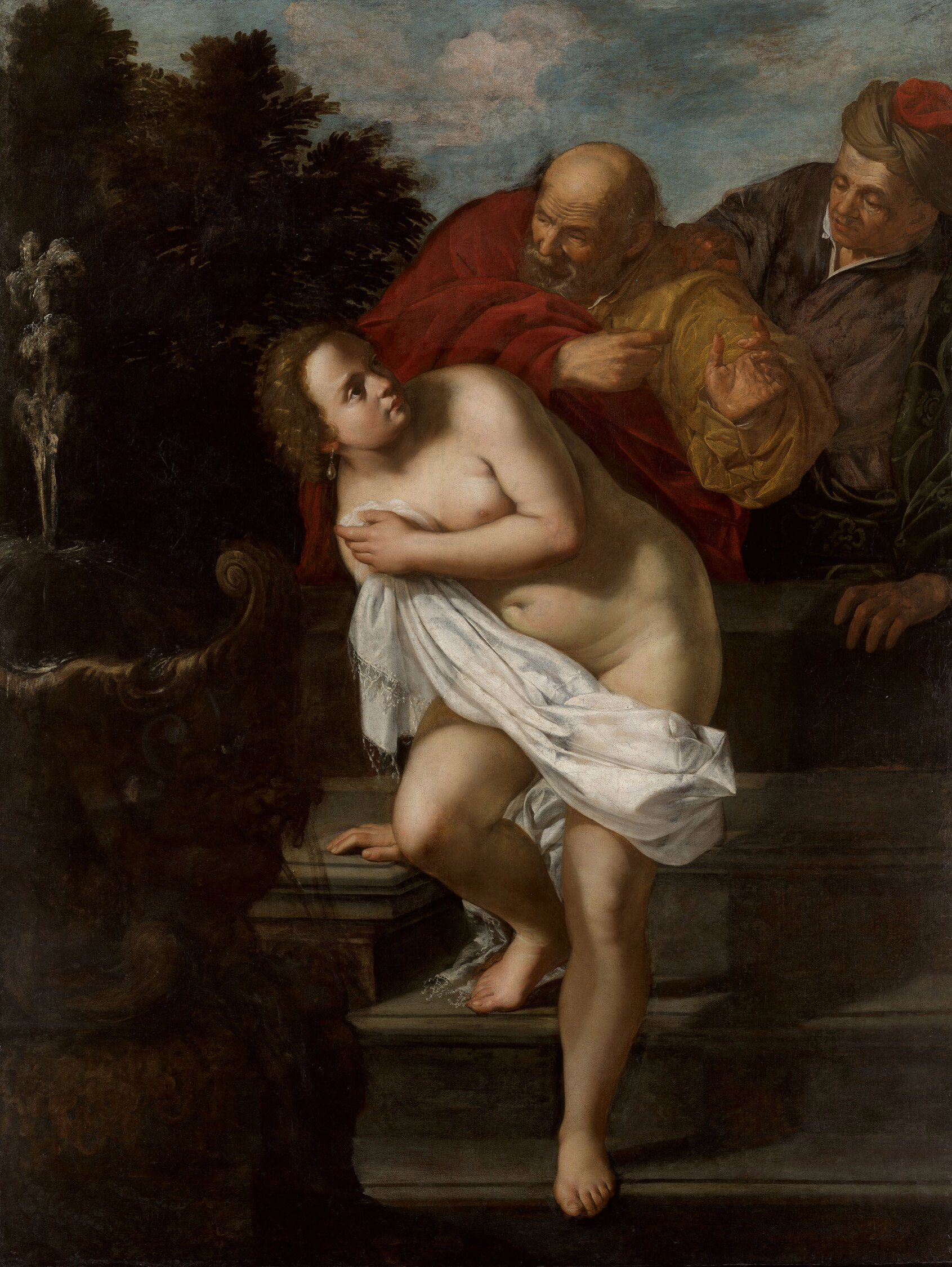
Susanna and the Elders (Artemisia Gentileschi, Windsor Castle)

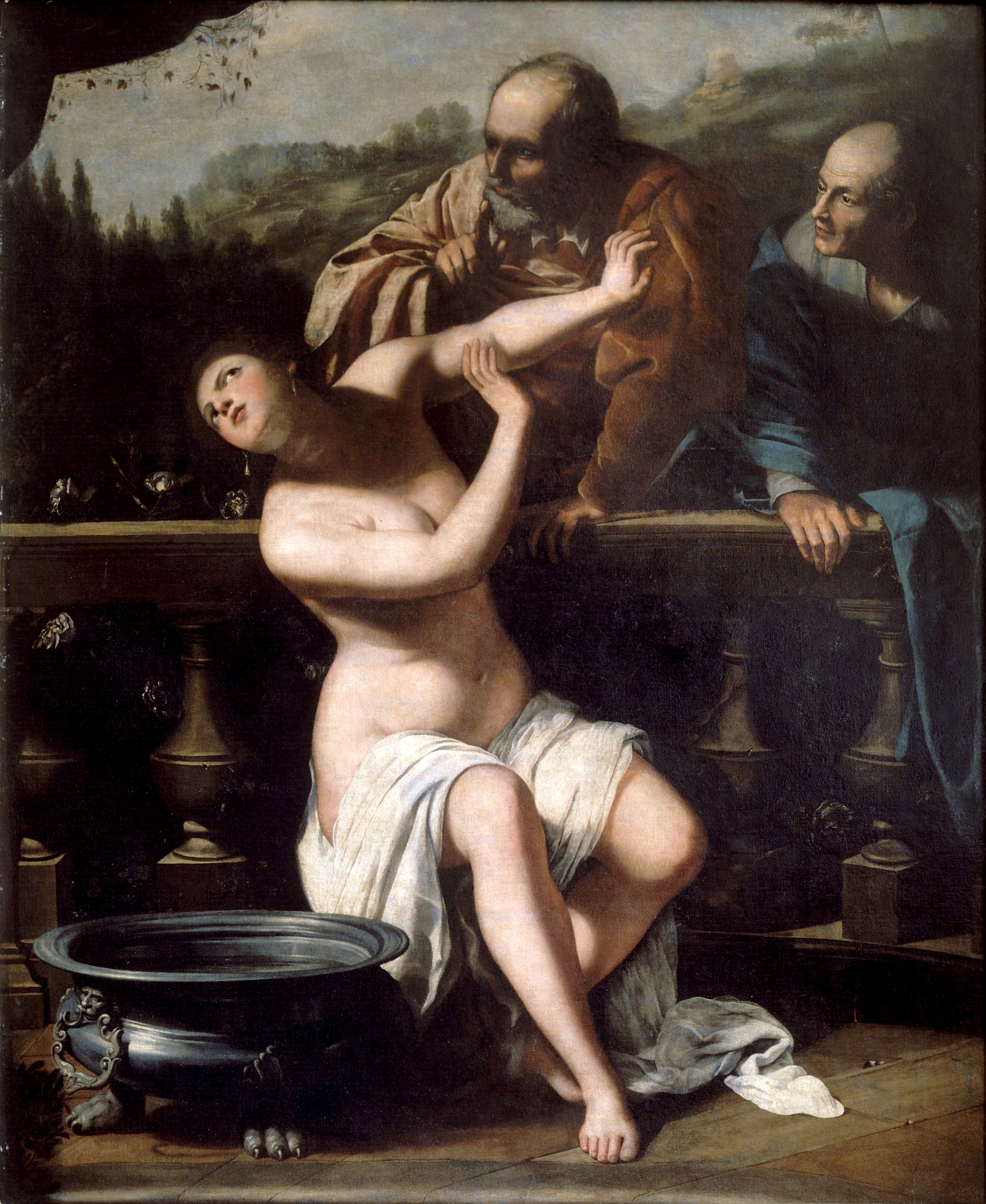
Susanna and the Elders (Artemisia Gentileschi, Brno)

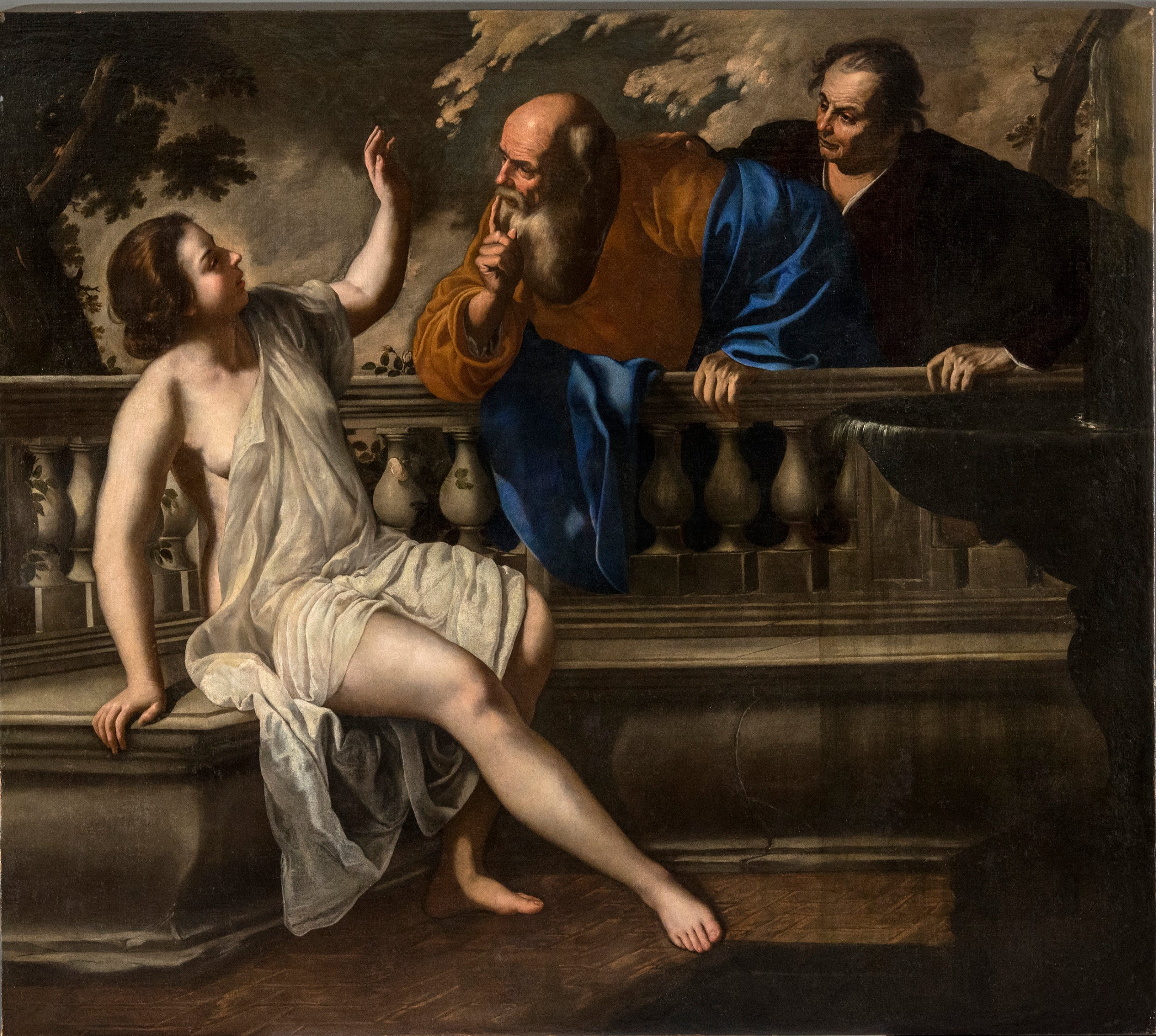
Susanna and the Elders (Artemisia Gentileschi, Bologna)

== See also ==
- List of works by Artemisia Gentileschi
- Susanna and the Elders in art

== Sources ==
- Locker, Jesse M. (2015). Artemisia Gentileschi: The Language of Painting. New Haven, Yale University Press. ISBN 9780300185119.
- Modesti, Adelina (2016). "A Newly Discovered Late Work by Artemisia Gentileschi: Susanna and the Elders of 1652". In Barker, Sheila (ed.). Women artists in early modern Italy : careers, fame, and collectors. London: Brepols. ISBN 9781909400351.
- Treves, Letizia (2020). Artemisia. [S.l.]: National Gallery(LONDON). pp. 222–3. ISBN 978-1-85709-656-9. OCLC 1117638110.
