= Cleopatra (Artemisia Gentileschi, Rome) =

Painting by Artemisia Gentileschi

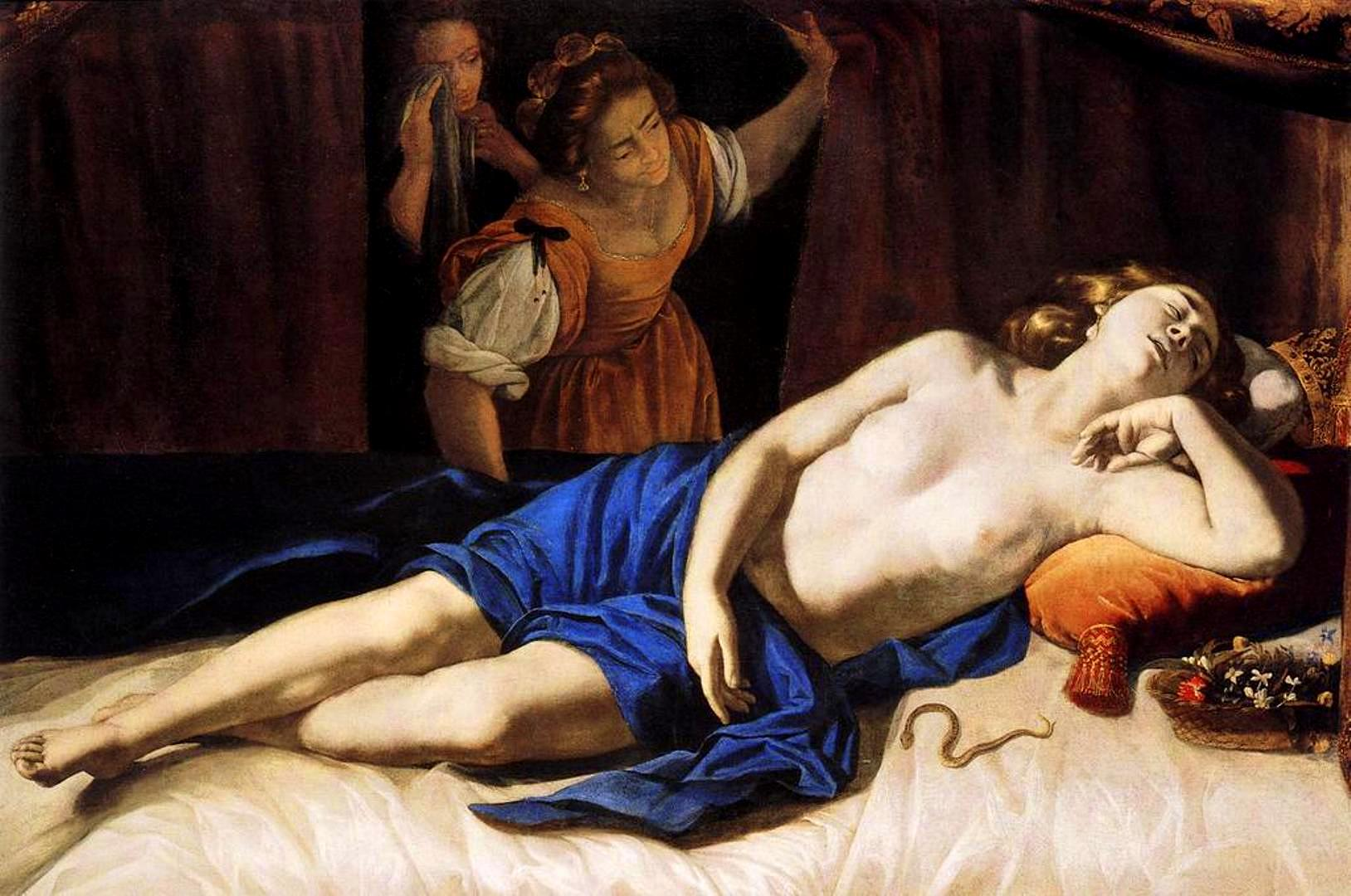
- Artist: Artemisia Gentileschi
- Year: c. 1633-5
- Medium: Oil on canvas
- Dimensions: 117 cm × 175.5 cm (46 in × 69.1 in)
- Location: private collection, Rome

Cleopatra is a painting by the Italian baroque artist Artemisia Gentileschi, completed in the mid-1630s. It is owned by a private collection in Rome.

== Description ==
The nude figure of a woman reclines on a bed, partly covered by a bright blue mantle, with a small basket of flowers at her left elbow. Two women enter the scene from behind a curtain, one of whom appears to be weeping. The extreme pallor of her skin and the small snake moving away on the sheet signify the final moments of Cleopatra's life. Her head has dropped back on the pillows, causing her crown to fall from her wavy golden hair. While Cleopatra was a relatively common subject for her contemporaries, it was rare to portray this moment of the story, the queen's death.

== History ==
=== Attribution ===
Until the 1980s, it was thought to be the work of Massimo Stanzione. While most scholars now accept this as a work of Artemisia, there are some indications that it may represent a collaboration with her pupil Onofrio Palumbo. Alternatively, it could simply be influenced by the style of her Neapolitan contemporaries.

=== Provenance ===
While it is believed to have been executed during the artist's time in Naples, the work is first recorded at the Matthiesen Gallery in London in the 1980s. It was purchased from the gallery in 1987 by the present owner.

== See also ==
- List of works by Artemisia Gentileschi
