= Aurora (Artemisia Gentileschi) =

Painting by Artemisia Gentileschi

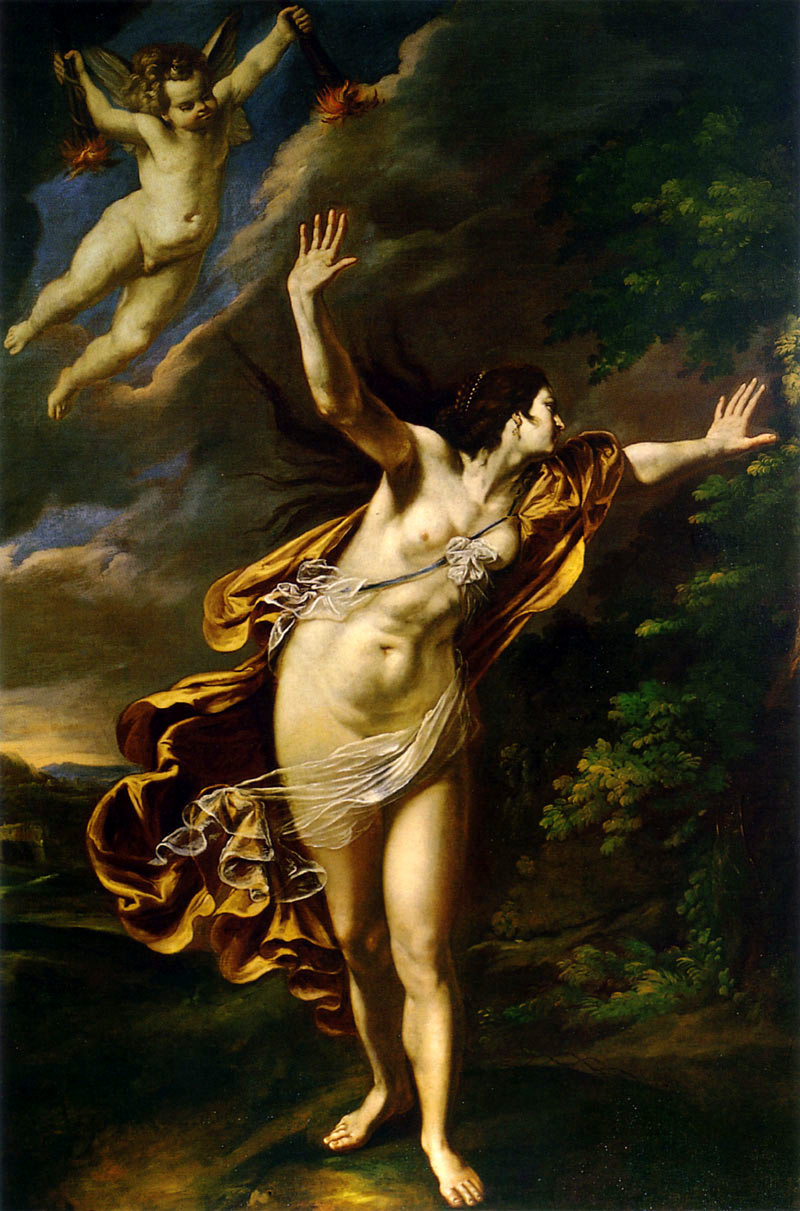
- Artist: Artemisia Gentileschi
- Year: c.1625-1627
- Medium: Oil on canvas
- Dimensions: 218 cm × 146 cm (86 in × 57 in)
- Location: Private collection, Rome

Aurora is a c.1625-1627 painting by the Italian artist Artemisia Gentileschi, depicting the Roman goddess of dawn. It is part of a private collection in Rome.

== Subject matter ==
In Roman mythology, the goddess Aurora rises every morning to signal the arrival of the Sun by coloring the sky, which was used in the period as a metaphor for creativity and beauty. Her contemporary Pierre Dumonstier created a drawing of Artemisia's hand holding a brush which refers to the "hands of Aurora", praising both her beauty as well as her skill as a colorist.

== Description ==
In the centre, the Roman mythological goddess Aurora stands with outstretched hands. Her gaze focuses to the right of the canvas, and her expression seems to be serious, though unreadable. Her body is draped in a delicate, bronze colored fabric that appears to flow with her movement. The rest of her body is exposed, besides a thin, transparent cloth that flows in the wind to coil around her waist. She is pictured with long, dark brown hair that also flies behind her in passing, kept from her face with a jeweled headpiece. Above her, appears a figure reminiscent of a cherub, a winged childlike being often associated with the divine. In its hands, it is holding two maroon colored flowers by the stems, pointed at Aurora. The flowers could symbolize the renewal of life, which is often attributed to flowers in Roman mythology, connecting to the renewal of light and dawn pictured in the painting. The background consists of a dark, clouded sky, but with a golden light illuminating from behind mountains to cast the depiction of a new dawn. Aurora appears to be standing on a dirt hill leading back to these mountains, with a tall green shrub behind her right hand.

== Provenance ==
The painting passed through the Arrighetti family before arriving on the art market in Florence in 1974. Bissell believes the patron was Niccolò Arrighetti, associate of Michelangelo Buonarroti, who had commissioned Gentileschi to paint Allegory of Inclination a decade earlier.

== See also ==
- List of works by Artemisia Gentileschi

== Sources ==
- Bissell, R. Ward (1999). Artemisia Gentileschi and the Authority of Art : Critical Reading and Catalogue Raisonné. University Park, Pa.: Pennsylvania State University Press. ISBN 9780271017877.
- Locker, Jesse (2015). Artemisia Gentileschi : the Language of Painting. New Haven: Yale University Press. ISBN 9780300185119.
