= Danaë (Artemisia Gentileschi) =

Painting by Artemisia Gentileschi

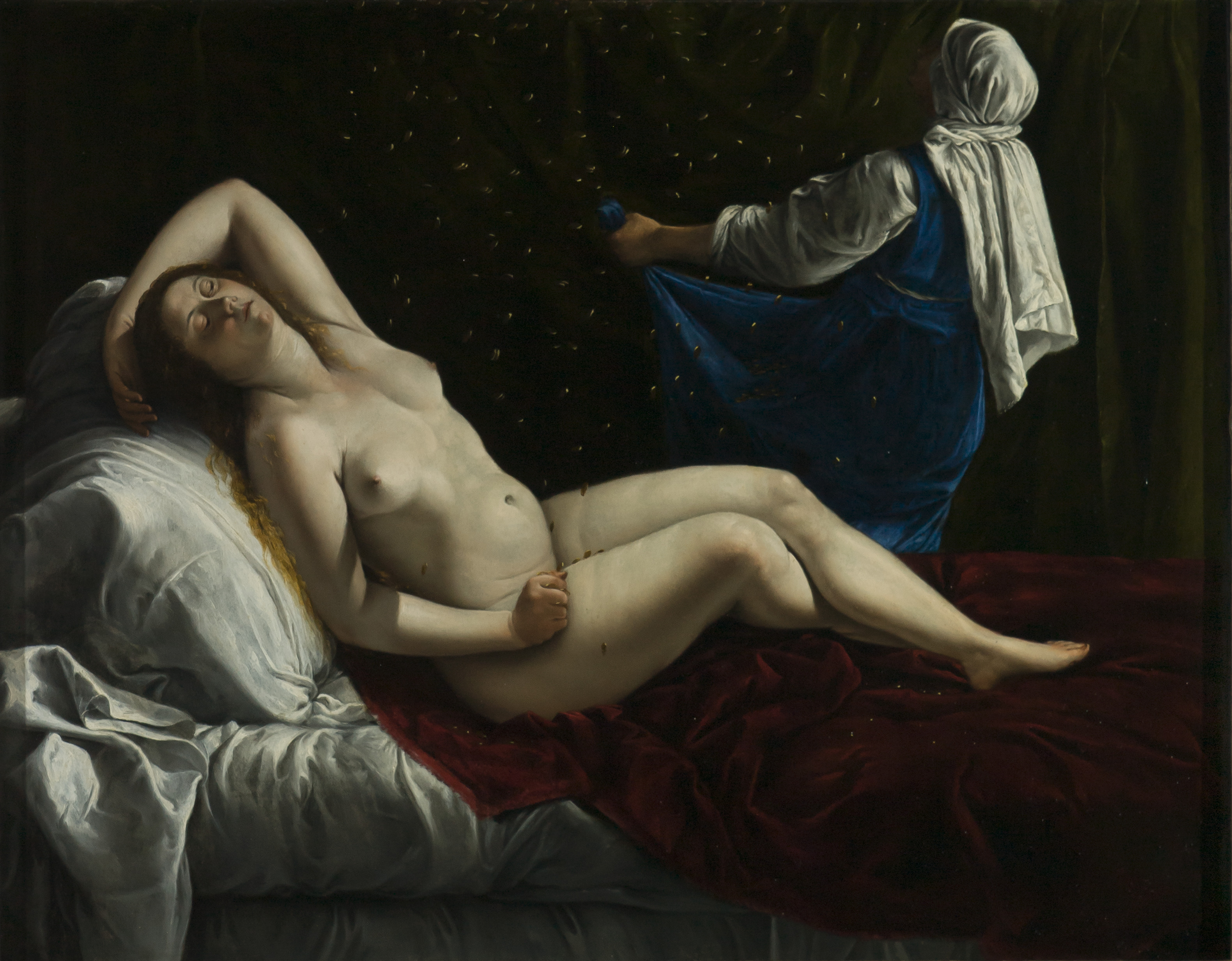
- Year: c. 1612
- Medium: oil paint, copper
- Dimensions: 41.3 cm (16.3 in) × 52.7 cm (20.7 in)
- Accession no.: 93:1986

Danaë is a 1612 painting by the Italian Baroque artist Artemisia Gentileschi. It hangs in the Saint Louis Art Museum, United States.

It is assumed that this is a self-portrait of the artist.

== Description ==
=== Subject matter ===
The story of Danaë is recorded in Ovid's Metamorphoses and recounts the plight of the daughter of King Acrisius of Argos. A prophecy led him to believe that his grandchild would lead to his death, and therefore imprisoned his daughter to prevent a potential pregnancy. Zeus overcame this challenge by transforming himself into a shower of gold, entering the room and seducing Danaë. She subsequently bore a son Perseus, who went on to kill his grandfather in his adulthood.

=== Composition ===
The nude figure of Danaë reclines on her richly textiled bed in a darkened space, while her servant wearing a white headscarf in the background collects gold coins in her blue skirts. The pose and design are based on Artemisia's earlier version of Cleopatra. A cleaning completed in 1986 removed old discolored varnish and restored the vibrant colors of the servant's dress.

== Interpretation ==
Art historians have debated this portrayal of Danaë, with some noting an open, inviting posture, while others observe the clenched fist and closed legs. Some scholars believe this painting refers directly to the rape the artist endured a few years prior, while others argue that she rather had a sympathy for women victimized by unwelcome sexual pressures.

== History ==
=== Attribution ===
Unlike most of Artemisia's surviving works, this painting was executed on copper. Given that Orazio was known to work frequently on copper, this has led scholars to debate the authorship between daughter and father. The attribution to Artemisia lies in both the naturalistic rendering of the female form as well as the sensitive portrayal of a woman's distress towards sexual violence.

=== Provenance ===
The painting was created while Artemisia was living in Rome, around 1612. The first documented appearance of the painting was at the Sotheby's sale in Monaco on February 22, 1986, where it was sold as a work of the artist's father Orazio. The painting was subsequently purchased by the Saint Louis Art Museum on August 1, 1986.

== See also ==
- Self-portraiture
- List of works by Artemisia Gentileschi

== Bibliography ==
Banta, Anadaleeb Badiee, Alexa Greist, and Theresa Kutasz Christensen, eds. Making her Mark: A History of Women Artists in Europe, 1400-1800. Toronto, Ontario: Goose Lane Editions, 2023. Published in conjunction with an exhibition of the same title, organized and presented by the Baltimore Museum of Art, October 1, 2023 – January 7, 2024 and the Art Gallery of Ontario, March 30, 2024 – July 1, 2024.
