= Virgin and Child with a Rosary =

Painting by Artemisia Gentileschi

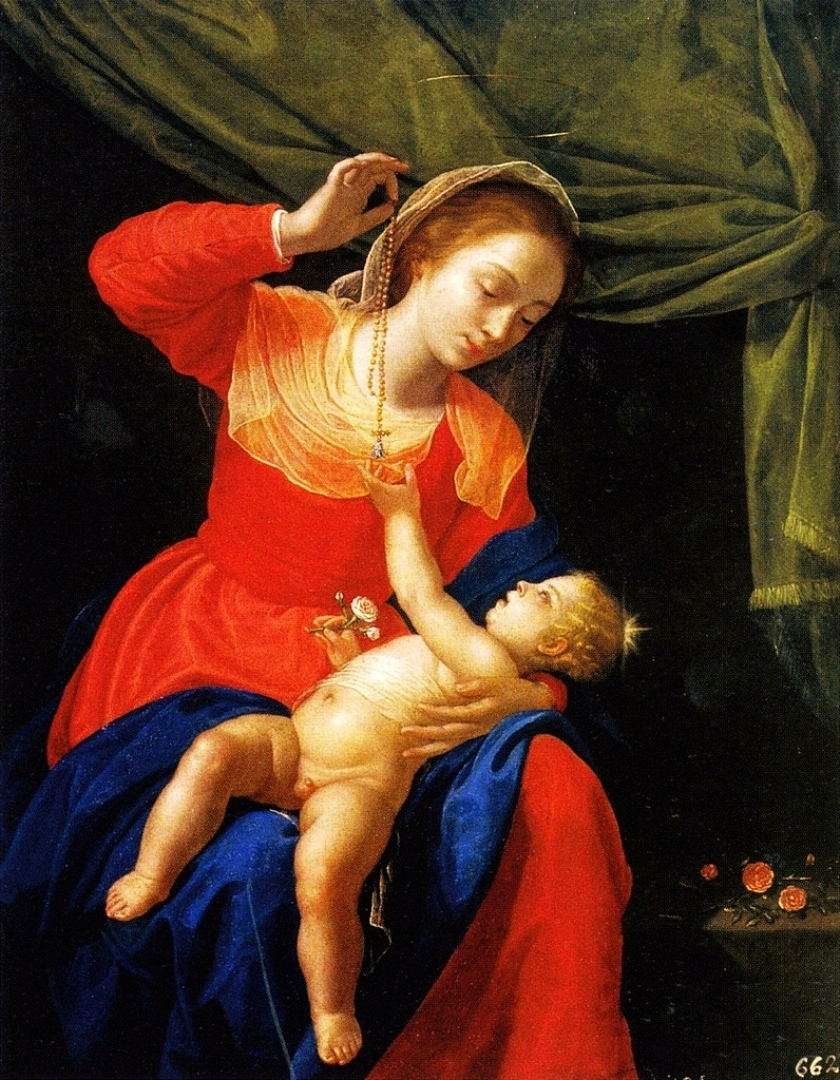
- Artist: Artemisia Gentileschi
- Year: 1651
- Medium: Oil on copper
- Dimensions: 59.5 cm × 38.5 cm (23.4 in × 15.2 in)
- Location: El Escorial, San Lorenzo de El Escorial

Virgin and Child with a Rosary (Italian: Madonna e Bambino con rosario) is one of the last known paintings by the Italian artist Artemisia Gentileschi. Small in size and painted with oil on copper, it was completed in 1651. It was part of the Spanish royal collection and currently hangs in the El Escorial collection, in Spain.

== Provenance ==
The painting is first mentioned in a 1749 inventory at La Granja, and was transferred to its current location by 1857. Recent research shows it was part of the collection of Maria Anna of Pfalz-Neuberg, second wife of Charles II, suggesting it may have been associated with Charles' father Philip IV.

== Attribution ==
There has been some debate as to whether the painting is actually by Gentileschi, despite her signature appearing across the edge of the table. One scholar pointed to the use of bright red, blue and green in the painting, which Gentileschi does not use elsewhere. However, the 2001 catalogue for the exhibition at the Metropolitan Museum of Art, suggests the painting is by Gentileschi, and that it draws heavily on early devotional pictures by the artist Guido Reni. The stylistic shift may represent a deliberate tactic to appeal to the taste of the patron.

== See also ==
- List of works by Artemisia Gentileschi

== Sources ==
- Christiansen, Keith; Mann, Judith Walker (2001). Orazio and Artemisia Gentileschi. New York; New Haven: Metropolitan Museum of Art; Yale University Press. ISBN 1588390063.
- Locker, Jesse (2015). Artemisia Gentileschi : the Language of Painting. New Haven: Yale University Press. ISBN 9780300185119.
