= Saint Apollonia (Artemisia Gentileschi) =

Painting by Artemisia Gentileschi

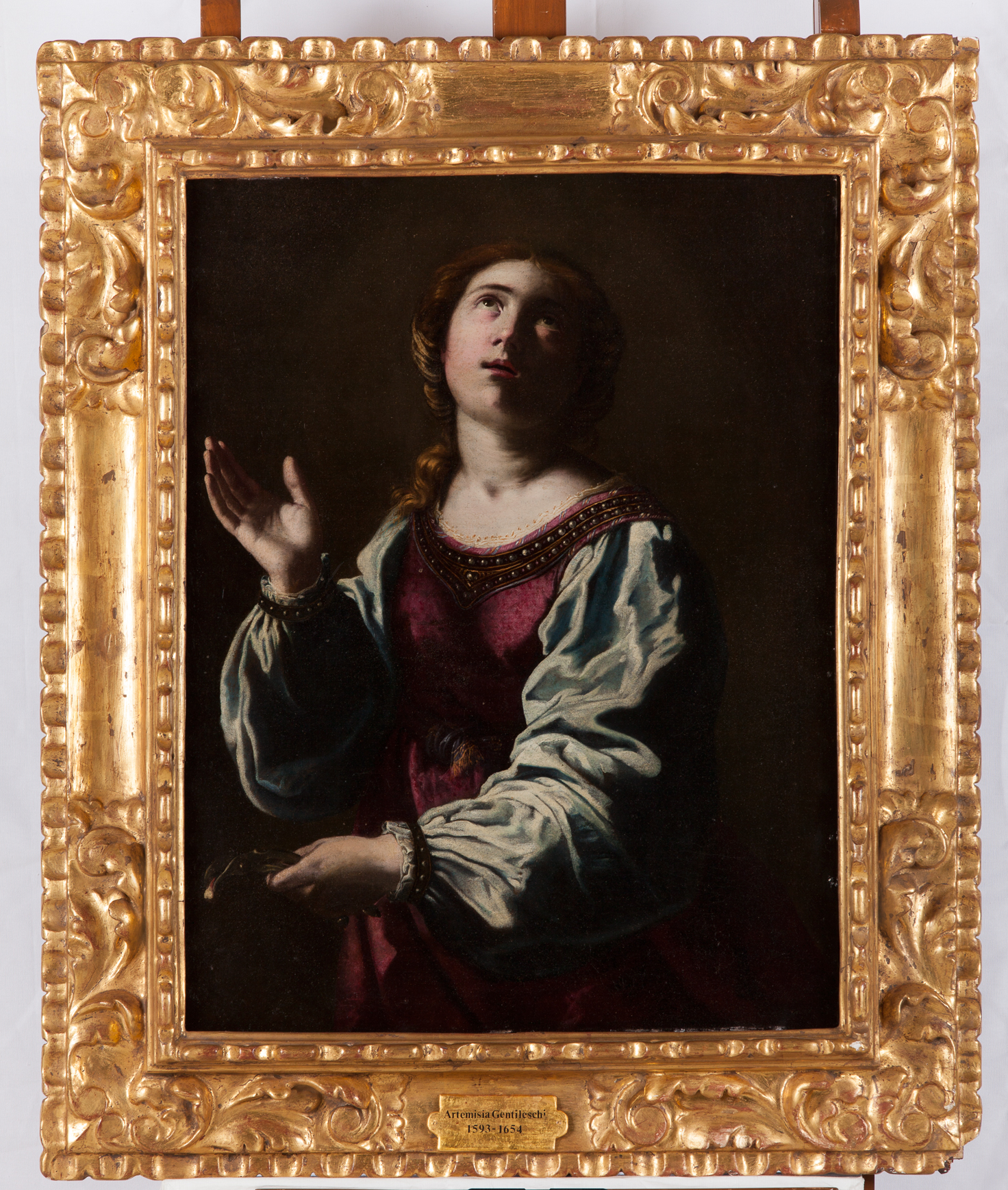
- Artist: Artemisia Gentileschi
- Year: c. 1642–1644
- Medium: Oil on canvas
- Movement: Baroque
- Subject: Saint Apollonia
- Dimensions: 89 cm × 72 cm (35 in × 28 in)
- Location: Museo Soumaya, Mexico City

Saint Apollonia is a painting attributed to the Italian baroque painter Artemisia Gentileschi executed between 1642 and 1644. It is part of the collection of the Museo Soumaya in Mexico City, Mexico.

== Description ==
The painting depicts Saint Apollonia, a martyr who died in Alexandria during an uprising against Christians in A.D. 249. The portrait shows the saint from the waist up, against a dark background, looking up, as if skyward. Her left hand extended upward, while her right hand is carrying a pair of tweezers with a tooth, an iconographic attribute that helps identify her as Apollonia.

The dress of Apollonia is mauve velvet with light blue sleeves that allow to appreciate the draping of the fabric. The sleeves and neck are adorned with pearls. An important aspect is the use of chiaroscuro, a pictorial technique typical of the baroque that helps make the picture more dramatic, in the style of Caravaggio.

The painting is believed to be painted in Naples, after her return from London in 1642, and was paired with picture of Saint Lucy.

== Provenance ==
The painting was undocumented before it appeared for sale at Sotheby's London in 1980.

== See also ==
- List of works by Artemisia Gentileschi

== Sources ==
- Bissell, R. Ward (1999). Artemisia Gentileschi and the authority of art : critical reading and catalogue raisonné. University Park, Pa.: Pennsylvania State University Press. ISBN 9780271017877.
- Giorgi, Rosa (2003). Saints in Art. Los Angeles: J. Paul Getty Museum. ISBN 9780892367177.
