= Bibliography on Artemisia Gentileschi =

This is an ongoing bibliography of work related to the Italian baroque painter Artemisia Gentileschi.

== 2025 ==
- Collectif Internation, Patrizia Cavazzini, Pierre Curie, Maria Cristina Terzaghi, eds. Artemisia: Héroïne de l'art. Fonds Mercator, 2025. Published in conjunction with exhibition of the same title at the Musée Jacquemart-André, March 19-August 3, 2025. ISBN 978-94-6230-393-5

== 2023 ==
- Banta, Andaleeb Badiee, Alexa Greist, and Theresa Kutasz Christensen, eds. Making Her Mark: A History of Women Artists in Europe, 1400-1800. Toronto, Ontario: Goose Lane Editions, 2023. Published in conjunction with an exhibition of the same title, organized by and presented at the Baltimore Museum of Art, October 1, 2023 – January 7, 2024 and the Art Gallery of Ontario, March 30, 2024-July 1, 2024. ISBN 978-1-77310-318-1.

== 2021 ==
- Gentileschi, Artemisia; Gentileschi, Orazio; Bronzini, Christofano; Stiattesi, Pierantonio; Baldinucci, Filippo; Medici, Averado de'; Morrona, Alessandro (2021). Lives of Artemisia Gentileschi. Lives of the Artists. Introduction by Sheila Barker. J. Paul Getty Museum. ISBN 9781606066638.

== 2020 ==
- Garrard, Mary D. (2020). Artemisia Gentileschi and Feminism in Early Modern Europe. Reaktion Books. ISBN 9781789142020.
- Treves, Letizia. (2020). Artemisia. [S.l.]: National Gallery (London). ISBN 978-1-85709-656-9. OCLC 1117638110.
- Trimarchi, Francesco; Marino, Enio; Bartalena, L. (2020). "The multinodular goiter of the virtuous Roman matron Lucretia by Artemisia Gentileschi". Journal of Endocrinological Investigation. 43 (5): 701–702. doi:10.1007/s40618-019-01157-9. PMID 31786793. S2CID 208359323.

== 2019 ==
- Bruno, Simone; Petrucci, Ferruccio; Impallaria, Anna (September 2019). "Judith and Holofernes: Reconstructing the History of a Painting Attributed to Artemisia Gentileschi". Heritage. 2 (3): 2183–2192. doi:10.3390/heritage2030132. hdl:11392/2411721.
- Siciliano, Gina (2019). I Know What I Am: The True Story of Artemesia Gentileschi. Fantagraphic Books. ISBN 978-1683962113. OCLC 1061819961.

== 2018 ==
- Garrard, Mary (2018). "Artemisia and Susanna". In Broude, Norma; Garrard, Mary D (eds.). Feminism And Art History. doi:10.4324/9780429500534. ISBN 9780429500534.

== 2017 ==
- Spinosa, Nicola; Baldassari, Francesca (2017). Artemisia Gentileschi e il suo tempo. Milan, Italy: Skira. ISBN 978-8857233253.

== 2015 ==
- Locker, Jesse M. (2015). Artemisia Gentileschi: The Language of Painting. New Haven, Yale University Press. ISBN 9780300185119.

== 2014 ==
- Barker, Sheila (December 2014). "A new document concerning Artemisia Gentileschi's marriage". The Burlington Magazine. Vol. 156, no. 1341. pp. 803–804.

== 2013 ==
- Contini, Roberto; Solinas, Francesco (2013). Artemisia: la musa Clio e gli anni napoletani (in Italian). Roma, De Luca: Blu palazzo d'arte e cultura (Pisa).
- Straussman-Pflanzer, Eve (2013). Violence & virtue: Artemisia Gentileschi's Judith slaying Holofernes. Chicago: The Art Institute of Chicago.
- Ward Bissell, R. (2013-01-01). "Artemisia Gentileschi: Painter of Still Lifes?". Source: Notes in the History of Art. 32 (2): 27–34. doi:10.1086/sou.32.2.23292909. JSTOR 23292909. S2CID 191396661.

== 2011 ==
- Solinas, Francesco; Nicolaci, Michele; Primarosa, Yuri (2011). Lettere di Artemisia: edizione critica e annotata con quarantatre documenti inediti (in Italian). Roma, De Luca. OCLC 800618970.
- Contini, Roberto; Solinas, Francesco (2011). Artemisia Gentileschi: storia di una passione (in Italian). Palazzo reale di Milano, Milano: 24 ore cultura.
- Lutz, Dagmar (2011). Artemisia Gentileschi: Leben und Werk (in German). Belser, Stuttgart, Germany. ISBN 978-3-7630-2586-2.
- SPEAR, RICHARD E. (2011-01-01). "Artemisia Gentileschi's 'Christ and the woman of Samaria'". The Burlington Magazine. 153 (1305): 804–805. JSTOR 41419161.
- PAPI, GIANNI (2011-01-01). "Artemisia Gentileschi: Milan". The Burlington Magazine. 153 (1305): 846–847. JSTOR 41419185.

== 2010 ==
- Harris, Ann Sutherland (2010-01-01). "Artemisia Gentileschi and Elisabetta Sirani: Rivals or Strangers?". Woman's Art Journal. 31 (1): 3–12. JSTOR 40605234.
- Locker, Jesse (2010-01-01). "An Eighteenth-Century Biography of Artemisia Gentileschi". Source: Notes in the History of Art. 29 (2): 27–37. doi:10.1086/sou.29.2.23208613. JSTOR 23208613. S2CID 193030104.

== 2006 ==
- Judith Mann, ed. (2006). Artemisia Gentileschi: Taking Stock. Brepols Publishers. ISBN 978-2503515076.
- Bal, Mieke; Garrard, Mary D; Salomon, Nanette (2006-01-01). The Artemisia files: Artemisia Gentileschi for feminists and other thinking people. Chicago (Illinois): The University of Chicago Press. ISBN 9780226035826. OCLC 901683623.

== 2004 ==
- Christiansen, Keith (2004). "Becoming Artemisia: Afterthoughts on the Gentileschi Exhibition". Metropolitan Museum Journal. 39: 101–126. doi:10.1086/met.39.40034603. S2CID 191428947.

== 2002 ==
- Vreeland, Susan (2002). The Passion of Artemisia. ISBN 978-0-7472-6533-7.

== 2001 ==
- Christiansen, Keith; Mann, Judith Walker (2001). Orazio and Artemisia Gentileschi. New York; New Haven: Metropolitan Museum of Art; Yale University Press. ISBN 978-1588390066.
- Garrard, Mary D. (2001). Artemisia Gentileschi around 1622: The Shaping and Reshaping of an Artistic Identity. University of California Press. ISBN 978-0520228412.
- Lapierre, Alexandra (2001). Artemisia: The Story of a Battle for Greatness. Vintage. ISBN 978-0-09-928939-5.

== 2000 ==
- Costa, Patrizia (2000-01-01). "Artemisia Gentileschi in Venice". Source: Notes in the History of Art. 19 (3): 28–36. doi:10.1086/sou.19.3.23206902. JSTOR 23206902. S2CID 193119728.
- Cohen, Elizabeth S. (2000-01-01). "The Trials of Artemisia Gentileschi: A Rape as History". The Sixteenth Century Journal. 31 (1): 47–75. doi:10.2307/2671289. JSTOR 2671289.

== 1999 ==
- Garrard, Mary D (1999-01-01). Artemisia Gentileschi: the image of the female hero in Italian Baroque art. Princeton, NJ: Princeton University Press. ISBN 978-0691002859. OCLC 759092033.
- Bissell, R. Ward (1999-01-01). Artemisia Gentileschi and the authority of art: critical reading and catalogue raisonné. University Park, Pa.: Pennsylvania State University Press. ISBN 978-0271017877. OCLC 38010691.

== 1998 ==
- Zarucchi, Jeanne Morgan (1998-01-01). "The Gentileschi "Danaë": A Narrative of Rape". Woman's Art Journal. 19 (2): 13–16. doi:10.2307/1358400. JSTOR 1358400.

== 1994 ==
- Cannon, Joann (2016-07-22). "Artemisia and the Life Story of the Exceptional Woman". Forum Italicum. 28 (2): 322–341. doi:10.1177/001458589402800207. S2CID 192918544.

== 1993 ==
- Garrard, Mary D. (1993). "Artemisia Gentileschi's 'Corisca and the Satyr'". The Burlington Magazine. 135 (1078): 34–38. ISSN 0007-6287. JSTOR 885426.

== 1989 ==
- Garrard, Mary D; Gentileschi, Artemisia (1989). Artemisia Gentileschi: the image of the female hero in Italian Baroque art. Princeton, N.J.: Princeton University Press. ISBN 978-0691002859. OCLC 450021624.

== 1982 ==
- Garrard, Mary D. (1982). "Artemisia and Susanna". In Broude, N. (ed.). Feminism and Art History: Questioning the Litany.

== 1980 ==
- Garrard, Mary D. (1980-01-01). "Artemisia Gentileschi's Self-Portrait as the Allegory of Painting". The Art Bulletin. 62 (1): 97–112. doi:10.2307/3049963. JSTOR 3049963.

== 1968 ==
- Bissell, R. Ward (1968-01-01). "Artemisia Gentileschi-A New Documented Chronology". The Art Bulletin. 50 (2): 153–168. doi:10.2307/3048529. JSTOR 3048529.

== 1963 ==
- "10. Bd., H. 4, Feb., 1963 of Mitteilungen des Kunsthistorischen Institutes in Florenz on JSTOR". JSTOR i27652123.
