= Portrait of a Gonfaloniere =

Painting by Artemisia Gentileschi

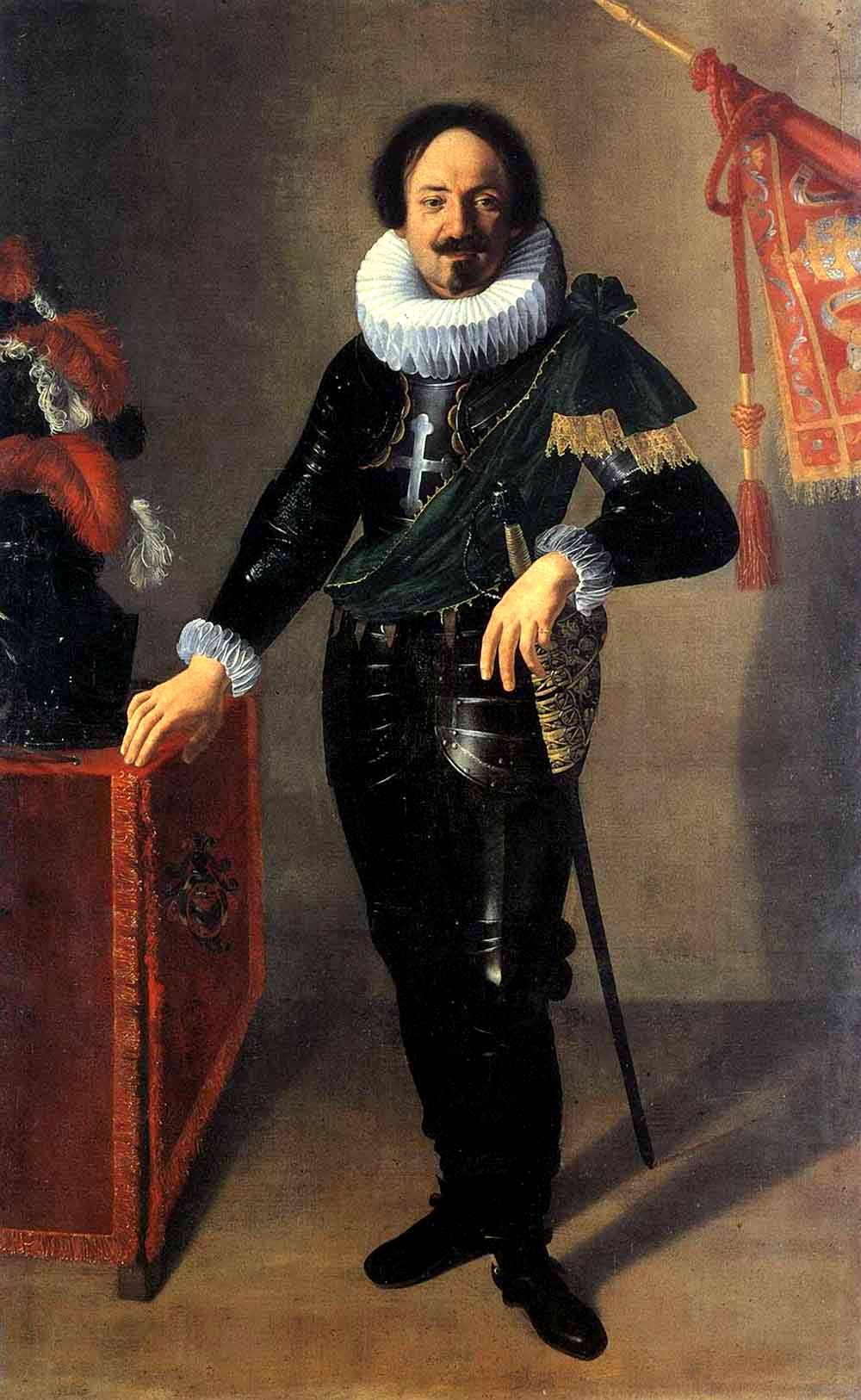
- Artist: Artemisia Gentileschi
- Year: 1622
- Medium: Oil on canvas
- Dimensions: 208.4 cm × 128.4 cm (82.0 in × 50.6 in)
- Location: Palazzo d'Accursio, Bologna

The Portrait of a Gonfaloniere is a painting by the Italian baroque artist Artemisia Gentileschi. It hangs in the Palazzo d'Accursio, Bologna. It is a portrait of an unknown gonfaloniere standing in full regalia and was painted in 1622. Mary D. Garrard has speculated that the man may be Pietro Gentile of Genoa.

== Description ==
An armor-clad man is shown in full-length view, with his left hand on the hilt of his sword and his right resting on a table covered in red velvet. He is further adorned with an elaborate white ruff and cuffs, as well as a green sash draped over his left shoulder. The insignia on his breastplate may indicate membership in the Order of Saints Maurice and Lazarus, an organization sworn to defend the papacy, even in battle. A papal banner hangs behind the figure, a symbol of his processional role. The coat of arms on the table cover has yet to be identified. It is signed and dated on the reverse, but scholars are not in agreement on the authenticity of the inscription. The painting was restored in 1964 and is noted as being in excellent condition.

== Provenance ==
The painting is first recorded as being in the collection of Agostino Pepoli, a member of an aristocratic family in Bologna. Upon his death in 1910, his heirs gave it to the Pinacoteca Nazionale, Bologna. It entered the collection of Palazzo d'Accursio in 1934.

== See also ==
- List of works by Artemisia Gentileschi
