= The Birth of Saint John the Baptist (Artemisia Gentileschi) =

Painting by Artemisia Gentileschi

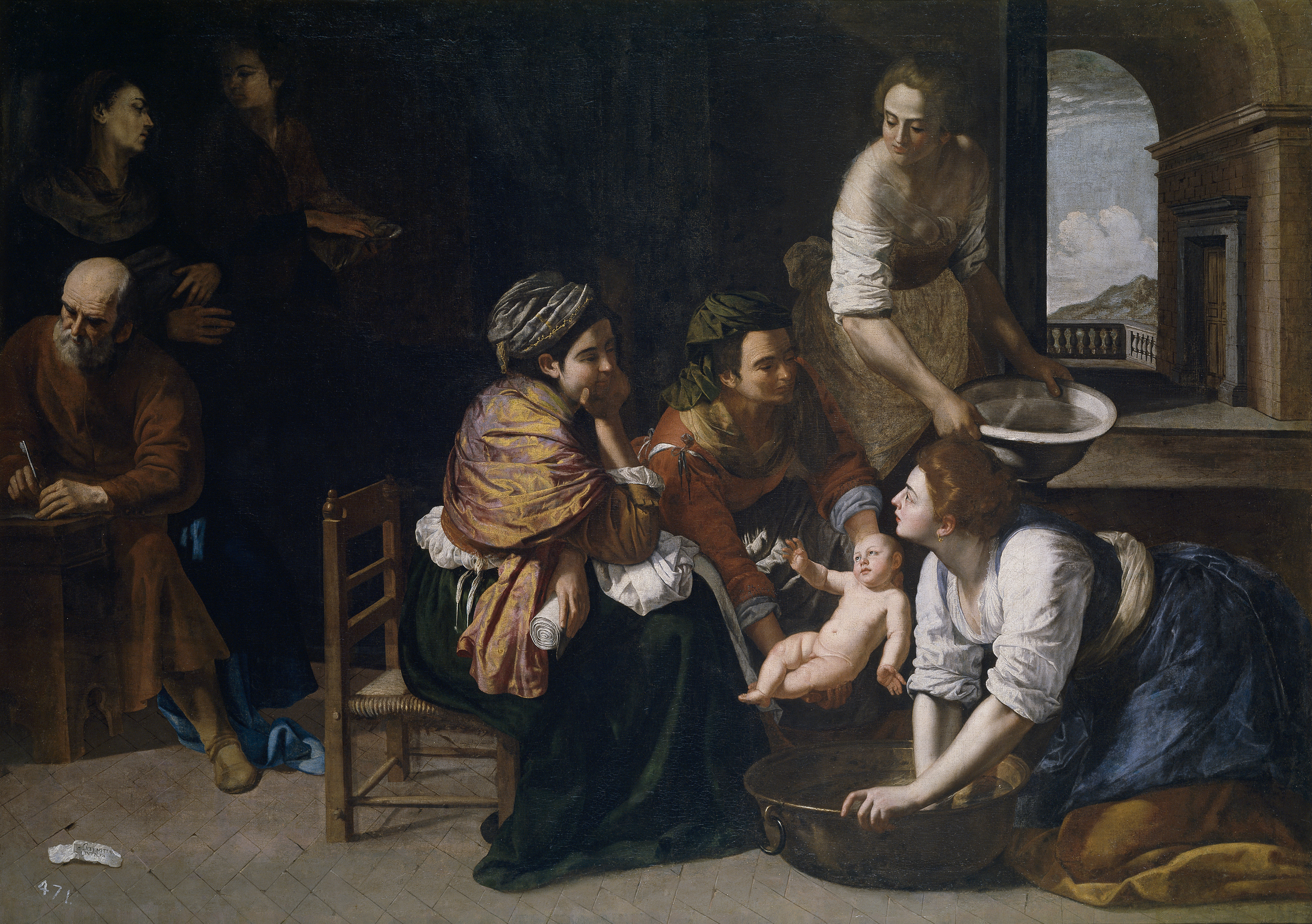
- Artist: Artemisia Gentileschi
- Year: c. 1635
- Medium: Oil on canvas
- Dimensions: 184 cm × 258 cm (72 in × 102 in)
- Location: Prado Museum, Madrid

The Birth of Saint John the Baptist, by Artemisia Gentileschi, was part of a six-painting portrayal of Saint John's life, with four of the paintings by Massimo Stanzione and one (now lost) by Paolo Finoglia, for the Hermitage of San Juan Bautista (Saint John the Baptist) on the grounds of Buen Rierto in Madrid, under orders from the Viceroy of Naples, the Conde de Monterrey. Although a date has not been agreed upon by scholars, Artemesia most likely painted The Birth of Saint John the Baptist between 1633 and 1635. It is one of the most renowned works from Artemisia's Naples period, especially due to its detailed rendering of fabrics and floor tiles.

The painting depicts a Bible story from Luke 1:5-80, in which Zacharias and his wife, Elizabeth, are too old to have children. One day the angel Gabriel appears to tell Zacharias that he and Elizabeth will have a son named John. Zacharias is literally dumbfounded and loses his ability to speak. Later, the baby is born and all the couple's neighbors and midwives insist that the baby should be named Zacharias, after his father. Elizabeth disagrees, so they ask for Zacharias's opinion. He writes on a tablet “His name is John” and regains his ability to speak. Thus Saint John the Baptist begins his miraculous life.

Before moving to Naples, Artemisia was known for arguably pre-feminist, secular works; but in Naples she began painting a great number of commissions for Spanish rulers and churches, so her subject matter became more religious. The composition of this painting, which emphasizes female neighbors and maidservants rather than the miracle of the story, is distinctly secular. The style of this painting, though specific to Artemisia, is heavily influenced by Caravaggio, Simon Vouet, and Massimo Stanzione. The painting is now on display at the Prado Museum in Madrid.

== See also ==
- List of works by Artemisia Gentileschi

== Sources ==
- See Brown, Jonathan, and John H. Elliott. A Palace for a King: The Buen Retiro and the Court of Philip 4. New Haven; London: Yale University Press, 2003. 228.
- Orazio and Artemisia Gentileschi. Ech. cat. Metropolitan Museum of Art, ed. Keith Christiansen and Judith W. Mann. New Haven and London: Yale University Press, 2001. 405.
- Garrard, Mary D. Artemesia Gentileschi: The Image of the Female Hero in Baroque Art. Princeton, 1989. 88.
- Locker, Jesse M. Artemisia Gentileschi: The Language of Painting. New Haven, 2015. 12.
- Vergara, Alexander. Rubens and His Spanish Patrons. New York: Cambridge University Press, 1999. 49.
- Bissel, R. Ward. Artemisia Gentileschi and the Authority of Art: Critical Reading and Catalogue Raisonné. University Park, Penn., 1999. 79.
