= Christ Blessing the Children =

Painting by Artemisia Gentileschi

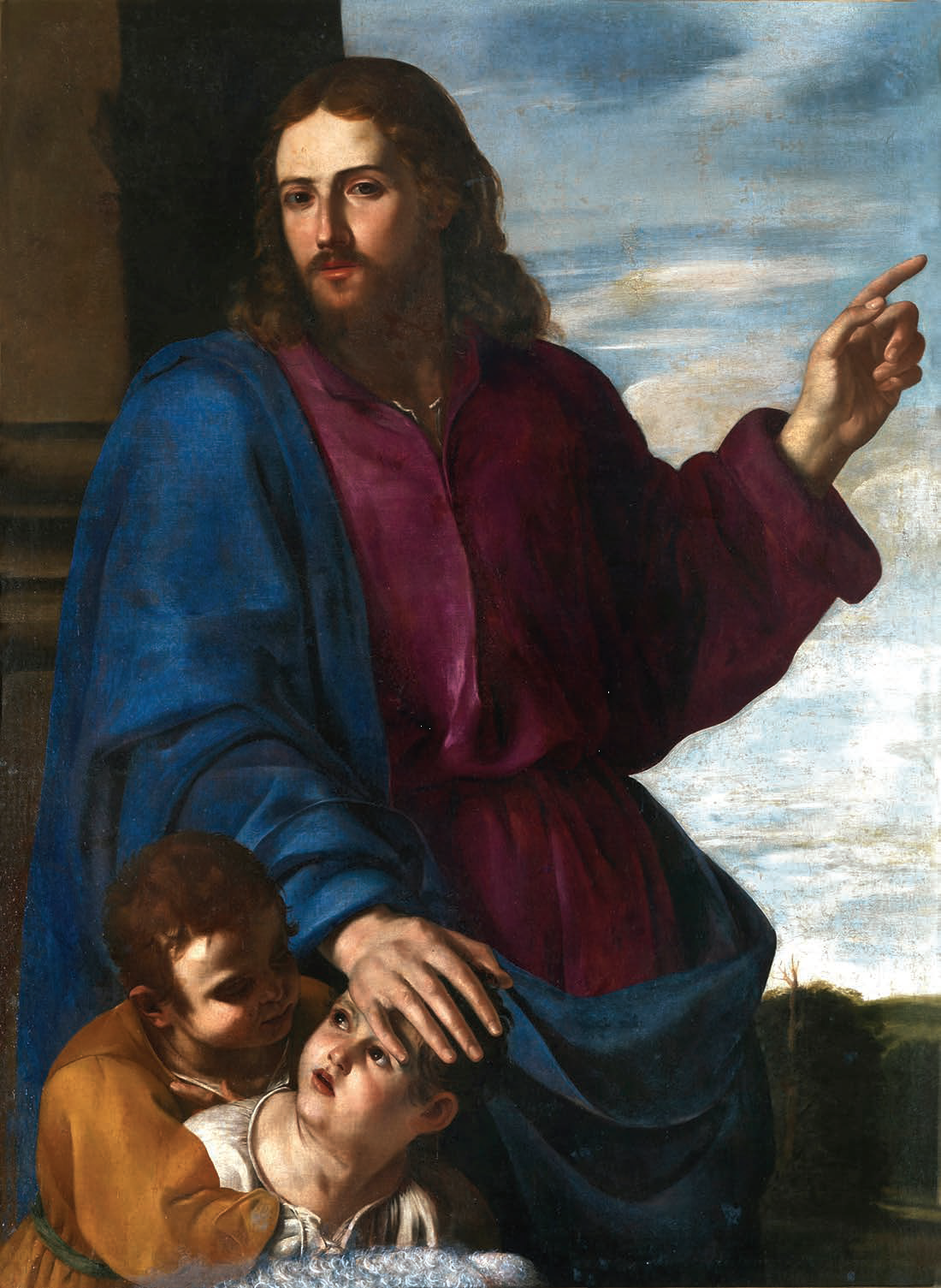
- Artist: Artemisia Gentileschi
- Year: c. 1624-1625
- Medium: Oil on canvas
- Dimensions: 134.6 cm × 97.7 cm (53.0 in × 38.5 in)
- Location: Sant'Ambrogio e Carlo al Corso, Rome

Christ Blessing the Children is a painting by the Italian artist Artemisia Gentileschi, depicting an episode from the New Testament. It hangs in the church of Sant'Ambrogio e Carlo al Corso in Rome.

== Description ==
The work's alternative title, "Suffer the little children to come unto me" is based on a passage from the gospel of Matthew in which Jesus was instructing his disciples through the example of children. The painting is part of the artist's body of religious work, which is less well-known than her depictions of strong women.

== Provenance ==
The painting's first home was the collection of Fernando Enriquez Afan de Ribera, the 3rd Duke of Alcalá, from 1626 to 1637. He purchased the painting in Rome while he was ambassador to the Holy See during 1625–1626. In 1626, he became viceroy of Naples, and then later returned to Seville in 1631. The work was intended for the charterhouse at Santa Maria della Cueves, which contained his family's chapel. It was later in the collection of the Duke of Sutherland at Stafford House, before being sold on to a collector in New York. The painting was first recognised as a Gentileschi based on a view of a black and white photograph in 2001, but the whereabouts were unknown; it had previously belonged to The Metropolitan Museum of Art, but had been deaccessioned in 1979 as a work of Carlo Rosa. In 2012, art historian Gianni Papi rediscovered the work in a church in Rome, but has yet to determine how it came to be there.

== See also ==
- List of works by Artemisia Gentileschi

== Sources ==
- Bissell, R. Ward (1999). Artemisia Gentileschi and the Authority of Art : Critical Reading and Catalogue Raisonné. University Park, Pa.: Pennsylvania State University Press. ISBN 9780271017877.
- Papi, Gianni (2012). "Artemisia Gentileschi's 'Suffer the little children to come unto me'". The Burlington Magazine. 154 (1317): 828–831. ISSN 0007-6287.
