= Portrait of a Nun (Artemisia Gentileschi) =

Painting by Artemisia Gentileschi

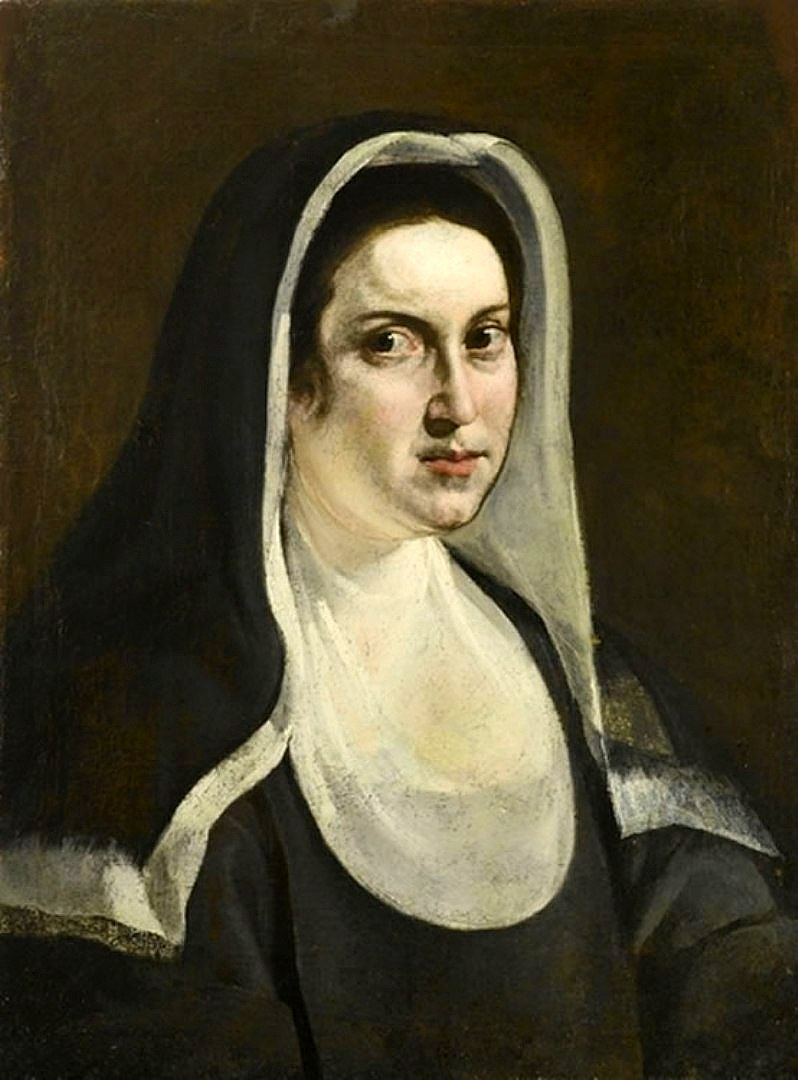
- Artist: Artemisia Gentileschi
- Year: 1610s
- Medium: oil paint
- Owner: private collection

The Portrait of a Nun is a painting from the 1610s, attributed to the Italian artist Artemisia Gentileschi. It is currently in a private collection

== See also ==
- List of works by Artemisia Gentileschi
