= Saint Cecilia (Artemisia Gentileschi) =

Painting by Artemisia Gentileschi

- Saint Cecilia as a Lute Player
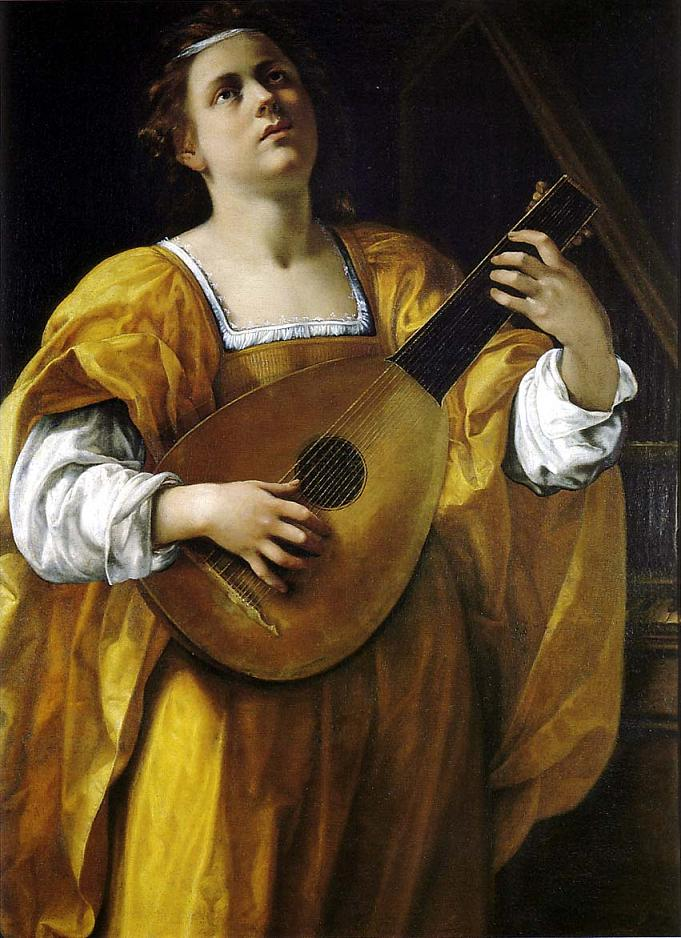
- Artist: Artemisia Gentileschi
- Year: c. 1620
- Dimensions: 108 cm (43 in) × 78.5 cm (30.9 in)
- Collection: Galleria Spada
- Identifiers: Bildindex der Kunst und Architektur ID: 08011668

Santa Cecilia is an early painting, from c. 1620, by the Baroque painter Artemisia Gentileschi, a painter described as "a grand exception in the history of art - a successful woman painter in an era in which art was dominated by men."

== Description ==
It shows a woman in a yellow gown and white chemise playing a lute, with an organ in the background. A cleaning in 1988 made the organ visible and confirmed the depiction of Saint Cecilia, an early Christian martyr who later became associated with musical instruments.

== Provenance ==
It is believed to have been painted in 1620 and is known to be in the collection Alessandro Biffi by 1637. It passed to the Spada collection in the seventeenth century as a means of settling debts and is currently in the Galleria Spada in Rome. In 1759 it was inventoried as "school of Titian", then later ascribed to Caravaggio and Caroselli, before being suggested as a work of Artemisia in 1911.

== See also ==
- List of works by Artemisia Gentileschi

== Sources ==
- Bissell, R. Ward (1999). Artemisia Gentileschi and the Authority of Art : Critical Reading and Catalogue Raisonné. University Park, Pa.: Pennsylvania State University Press. ISBN 9780271017877.
- Christiansen, Keith; Mann, Judith Walker (2001). Orazio and Artemisia Gentileschi. New York; New Haven: Metropolitan Museum of Art; Yale University Press. ISBN 1588390063.
- Locker, Jesse M. (2015). Artemisia Gentileschi: The Language of Painting. New Haven, Yale University Press. ISBN 9780300185119.
