= Matthiesen Gallery =

Art gallery in London, England

Coordinates: 51.5072°N 0.1375°W

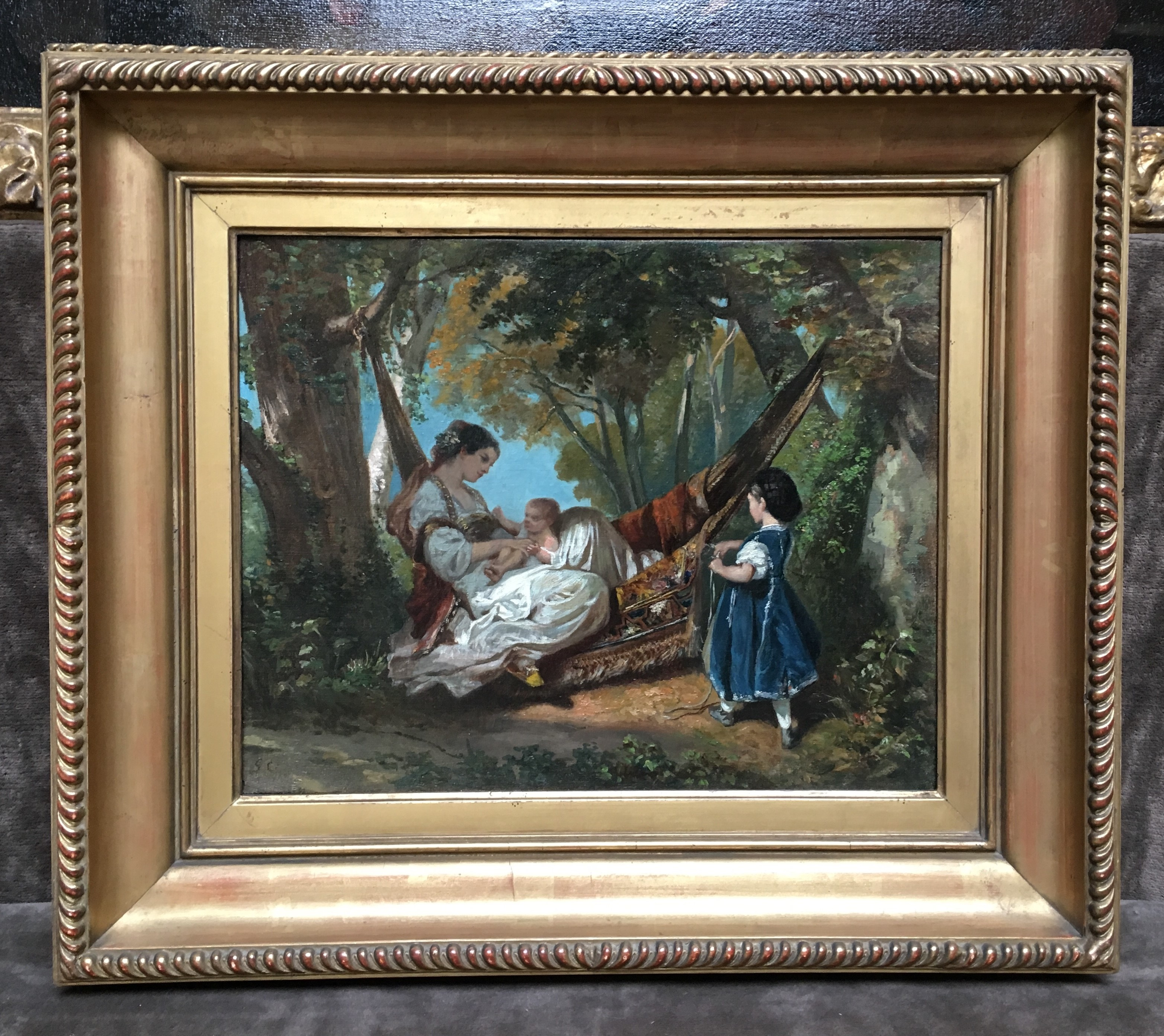
Gustave Courbet, Femme au hamac tenant son enfant, c.1848. 32 x 40.5 cm. Matthiesen Gallery.

The Matthiesen Gallery is an art gallery in St James's, London, England, founded in 1978 by Patrick Matthiesen, son of Francis Matthiesen, an art dealer of Berlin and London. It operates as both a commercial gallery and an art museum.

The gallery is located at 7-8 Mason Yard, Duke Street St James's.

An earlier Matthiesen Gallery was operated by Francis, first in Berlin, then in London, after he fled Nazi Germany.
