= Lucretia (Artemisia Gentileschi, Potsdam) =

Painting by Artemisia Gentileschi in the Neues Palais, Potsdam

Tarquin and Lucretia
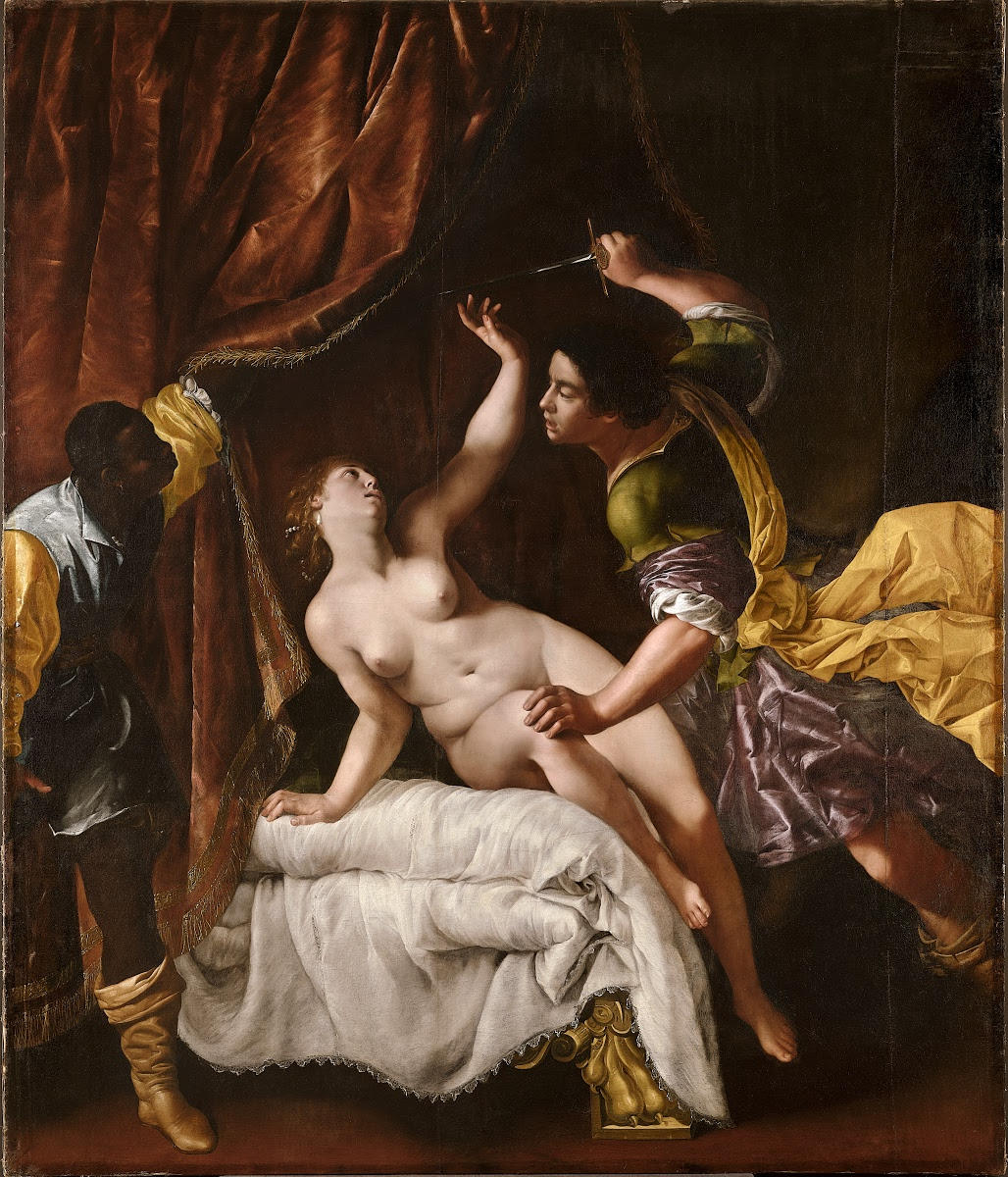
- Artist: Artemisia Gentileschi
- Year: c. 1645–1650
- Medium: Oil on canvas
- Dimensions: 261 cm × 226 cm (103 in × 89 in)
- Location: Neues Palais, Potsdam

Tarquin and Lucretia is a 1620–1650 oil on canvas painting by Artemisia Gentileschi. It hangs in the Great Hall of the Neues Palais in Potsdam. It is one of three paintings that Gentileschi painted of Lucretia, the wife of Roman consul and general Tarquinus, at the moment of her suicide. The other two versions are in a private collection in Milan (painted a few years before the Getty version) and The Getty Museum in Los Angeles.

== Subject matter ==
Lucretia was an ancient Roman heroine, known for her beauty and modesty. According to legend as documented by Livy in his History of Rome, she was acclaimed as a highly virtuous woman by her husband Collatinus. She was raped by the Roman nobleman Sextus Tarquinius, a relative of her husband, who threatened her with murder and the public humiliation of her corpse if she resisted. Given the risk of defamation she gave in to his sexual demands, but afterwards reported the attack to her husband and father before taking her own life. In doing so, she retained her honor and virtue (according to Roman beliefs). Her suicide led to a rebellion that brought down the Etruscan monarchy and marked the beginning of the Roman Republic.

== Provenance ==
The painting is first recorded in the collection of the Palazzo del Giardino in Parma in 1671 and remained there until the 1730s, in the collection of the Farnese Dukes, beside two other paintings by Gentileschi, Bathsheba and Judith and her Maidservant. In the 1730s, the Carlo di Barbone, Duke of Parma, inherited the Farnese collection and shipped it to the newly-constructed Palazzo di Capodimonte in Naples. Two of the paintings - Tarquin and Lucretia and Bathsheba - were acquired for Frederick the Great for his Neues Palais in Potsdam in the 1750s. Judith was not shipped along with the others as it depicted a woman triumphing over a man, which did not fit the theme of the planned Obere Galerie in Potsdam.

== See also ==
- List of works by Artemisia Gentileschi

== Sources ==
- Bissell, R. Ward (1999). Artemisia Gentileschi and the Authority of Art : Critical Reading and Catalogue Raisonné. University Park, Pa.: Pennsylvania State University Press. ISBN 9780271017877.
