= Allegory of Inclination =

Painting by Artemisia Gentileschi

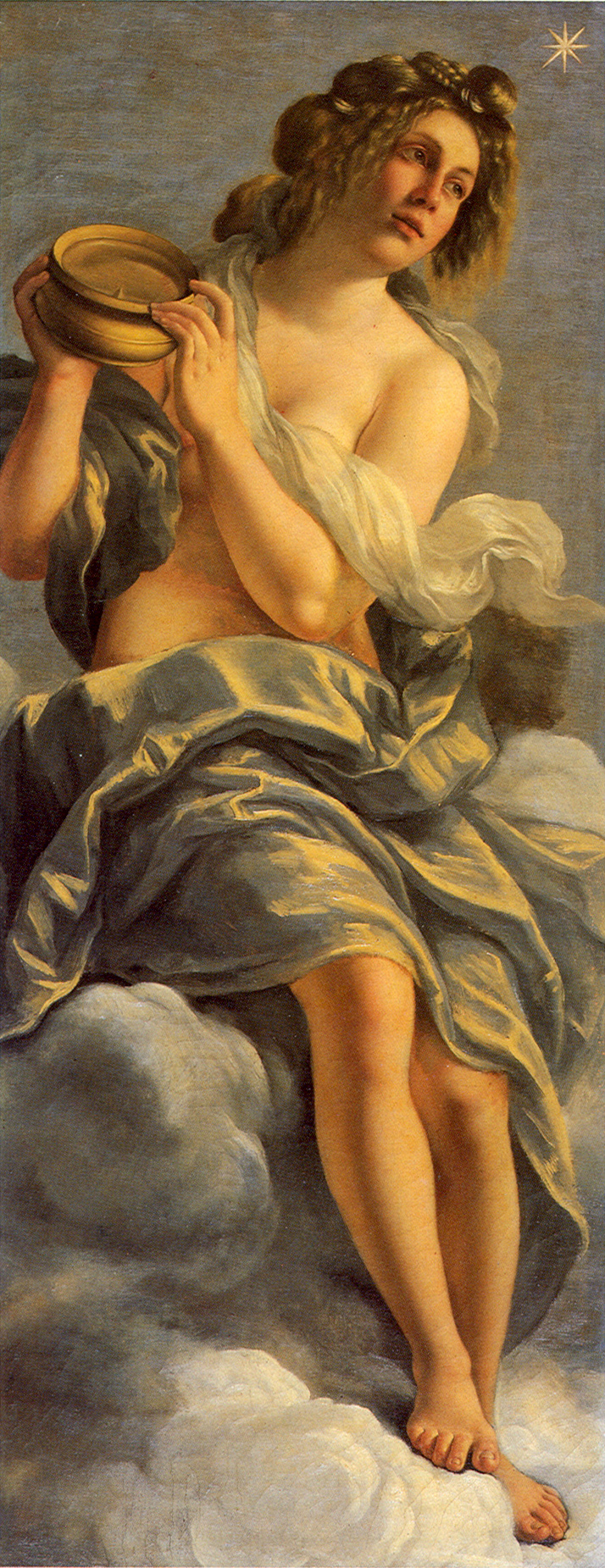
- Artist: Artemisia Gentileschi
- Year: 1615-1616
- Medium: Oil on canvas
- Movement: Baroque
- Dimensions: 152 cm × 61 cm (60 in × 24 in)
- Location: Casa Buonarroti; Florence

Allegory of Inclination is a 1615-1617 oil on canvas painting by Artemisia Gentileschi on the ceiling of the Galleria in the Casa Buonarroti, in Florence. The painting depicts a young nude female seated in the heavens holding a compass. Her light-colored hair is elaborately styled and she is partially covered by swirling drapery (added later by another hand). A star appears above her head.

== History ==
It was commissioned by Michelangelo Buonarroti the Younger (1568–1646) as part of a series of paintings to glorify the life of his great uncle, Michelangelo Buonarroti. The painting depicts "Inclination," or inborn creative ability, one of the "eight Personifications" attributed to the Renaissance master. Seated on a cloud, she holds a mariner's compass and is guided by a star above, signifying his natural disposition to greatness. Gentileschi worked alongside Giovanni Biliverti, Giovanni Coccapani and Matteo Rosselli to complete the series, while she was recovering from the birth of her second child.

The figure's features are similar to those in self-portraits in Gentileschi's oeuvre. The facial design, wispy hair and dimpled hands are characteristic of other paintings she created during her time in Florence. The figure was painted as nude; the nudity was embarrassing to the commissioner's great-nephew Leonardo Buonarroti, and he commissioned Baldassare Franceschini, known as il Volterrano, to paint swirling veils and drapery over parts of it in 1684.

== Restoration ==
In November 2022, work to restore the painting began. It was not possible to physically remove the added drapery without damaging the work, so the restorers planned to create a digital replica of the original version "using ultraviolet light, diagnostic imaging and X-rays to differentiate Gentileschi's brush strokes from those of the artist [who] covered the nudity". From September 2023, the restored work was exhibited alongside a simulation of the original uncensored version.

== See also ==
- List of works by Artemisia Gentileschi

== Sources ==
- Bissell, R. Ward (1999). Artemisia Gentileschi and the Authority of Art : Critical Reading and Catalogue Raisonné. University Park, Pa.: Pennsylvania State University Press. ISBN 0-271-01787-2. OCLC 1008129172.
- Christiansen, Keith; Mann, Judith Walker (2001). Orazio and Artemisia Gentileschi. New York; New Haven: Metropolitan Museum of Art; Yale University Press. ISBN 1588390063.
- Garrard, Mary D. (1989). Artemisia Gentileschi : the Image of the Female Hero in Italian Baroque art. Princeton, NJ. ISBN 9780691040509.
- Perry, Gillian (1999). Gender and Art. Yale University Press. ISBN 9780300077605.
