= Cleopatra (Artemisia Gentileschi, Milan) =

Painting from the Gentileschi workshop

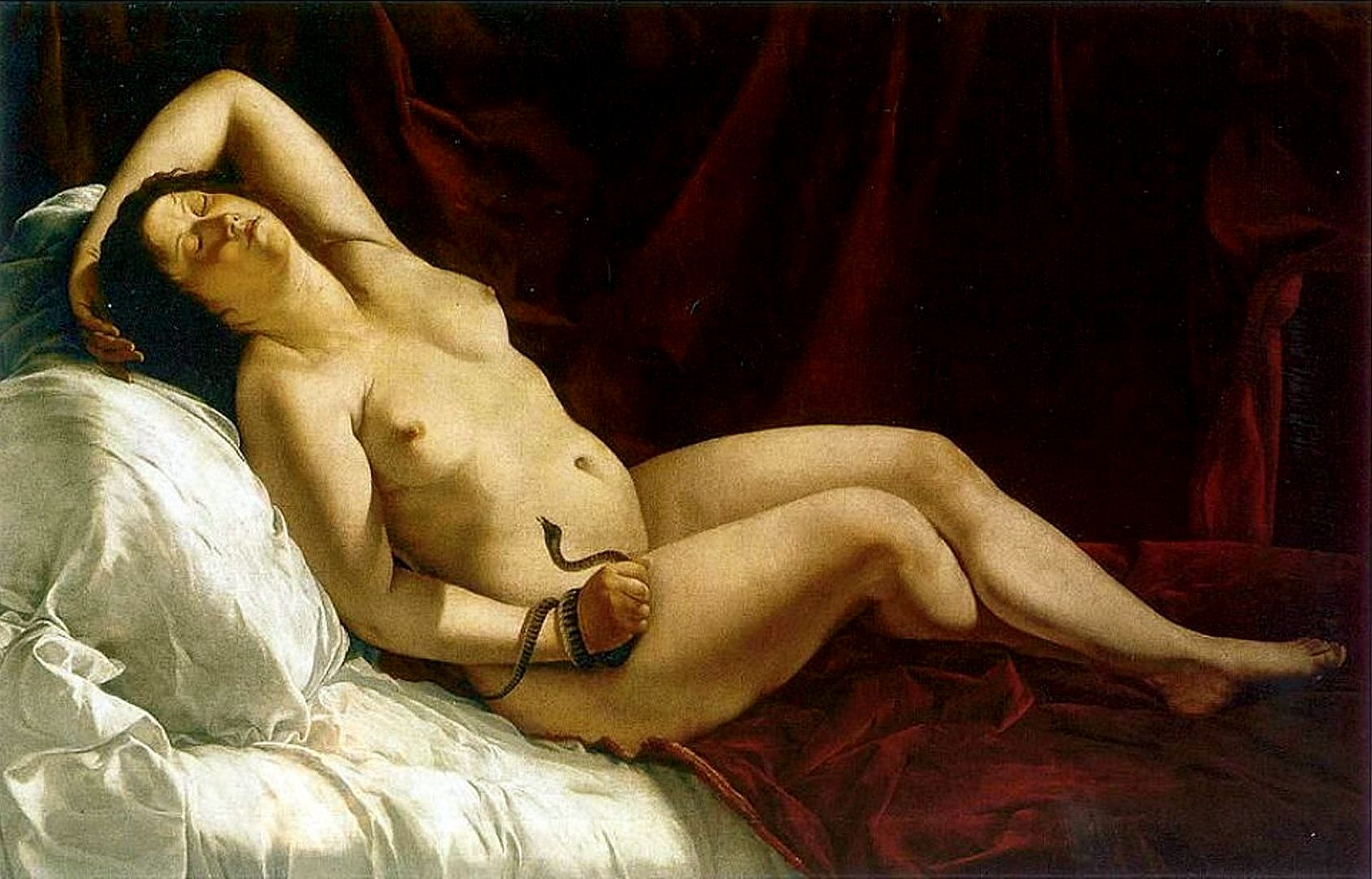
- Artist: Artemisia Gentileschi
- Year: 1611-1612
- Medium: oil on canvas
- Movement: Baroque
- Dimensions: 117.5 cm × 182 cm (46.3 in × 72 in)
- Location: Etro collection, Milan

Cleopatra is a 1611-1612 oil on canvas painting of Cleopatra by Artemisia Gentileschi, now in the private Etro collection in Milan.

It is unquestionably from the Gentileschi workshop, but secure authorship to either Orazio or Artemisia is disputed.

== Description ==
=== Subject matter ===
The painting depicts Cleopatra, the Egyptian queen, alone in the moments before she commits suicide by submitting to a venomous snakebite. A common theme for artists of the period, the artist may have drawn upon Plutarch's account which described her death from the bite of an asp. The pose is based upon that of an ancient statue now known as Sleeping Ariadne, which had been thought to represent Cleopatra wearing a snake-like piece of jewelry on her arm.

=== Attribution ===
Given the close collaboration between father and daughter at the start of Artemisia's career, art historians have struggled to achieve consensus on the attribution of this work. Keith Christiansen has argued this is the work of Orazio, given the masterful depiction of the textiles, for which he was renowned. Mary D. Garrard advocates for an attribution to Artemisia, given the strong emotional tension of the piece, while Letizia Treves cites the realistic rendering of the female form as conclusive evidence of Artemisia's authorship.

== History ==
The painting was known to be in the collection of Pietro Gentile until 1640–1641, hanging in Palazzo Gentile in Genoa alongside her Lucretia. It remained in the Gentile family collection until the early 19th century, at which point it is recorded in the Adorno collection. It later appeared in the Morandotti collection in 1971, from which it was lent to the Gentileschi exhibition in 2001. Extensive restoration work was undertaken in during 1967–1978, revealing a great depth of color and skill in rendering. Conservators also removed a large strip of canvas from the top of the painting, which was assessed as being a later addition. In April 2004, it was acquired by the Gerolamo Etro collection in Milan.

== See also ==
- List of works by Artemisia Gentileschi
