= Susanna and the Elders (Artemisia Gentileschi, Brno) =

Painting by Artemisia Gentileschi (Brno)

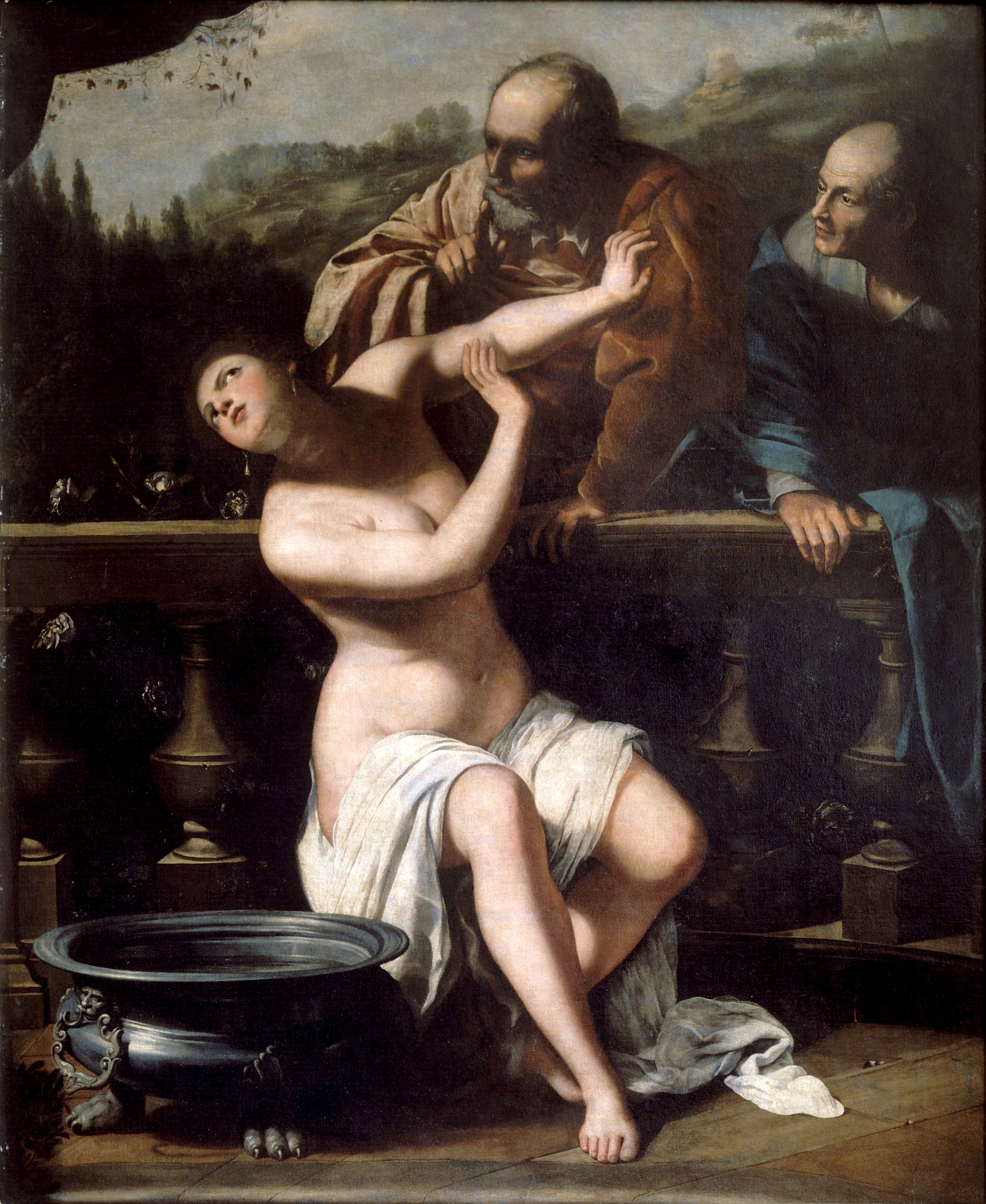
- Artist: Artemisia Gentileschi
- Year: 1649
- Medium: Oil on canvas
- Dimensions: 205 cm × 168 cm (81 in × 66 in)
- Location: Moravian Gallery (Moravská galerie), Brno

Susanna and the Elders is one of several paintings on this theme executed by the Italian baroque artist Artemisia Gentileschi. This version, painted in 1649, hangs in the Moravian Gallery in Brno, Czech Republic. It is signed with Gentileschi's signature and the date on the balustrade on the right.

== Description ==
The painting tells the story of Susanna from the Book of Daniel. After having taken a bath in her garden, Susanna is blackmailed by two older men who threaten her with claims of promiscuity unless she has sex with them.

Unlike her earlier versions of the painting, Gentileschi here follows "a far more traditional interpretation", with Susanna looking heavenward as if to ask for divine assistance in fighting off the elders. The landscape is however more elaborated than in most of Artemisia's works.

Significant damage and overpainting were addressed during a restoration in 1953–54, which also determined that the canvas had been cut down on all sides.

== Provenance ==
The painting is first documented in the collection of Brno industrialist Heinrich Gomperz in 1894 and was subsequently bequeathed to the city. It was previously ascribed to "Caracci", but was reassigned after the recovery of the signature during the 1953-54 restoration.

== See also ==
- List of works by Artemisia Gentileschi
- Susanna and the Elders in art

== Sources ==
- Bissell, R. Ward (1999). Artemisia Gentileschi and the authority of art : critical reading and catalogue raisonné. University Park, Pa.: Pennsylvania State University Press. ISBN 9780271017877.
- Christiansen, Keith (2001). Orazio and Artemisia Gentileschi. New York: Metropolitan Museum of Art. ISBN 9781588390066.
- Modesti, Adelina (2016). "A Newly Discovered Late Work by Artemisia Gentileschi: Susanna and the Elders of 1652". In Barker, Sheila (ed.). Women artists in early modern Italy : careers, fame, and collectors. London: Brepols. ISBN 9781909400351.
