= Lucretia (Artemisia Gentileschi, Milan) =

Painting by Artemisia Gentileschi

- Lucretia (1625)
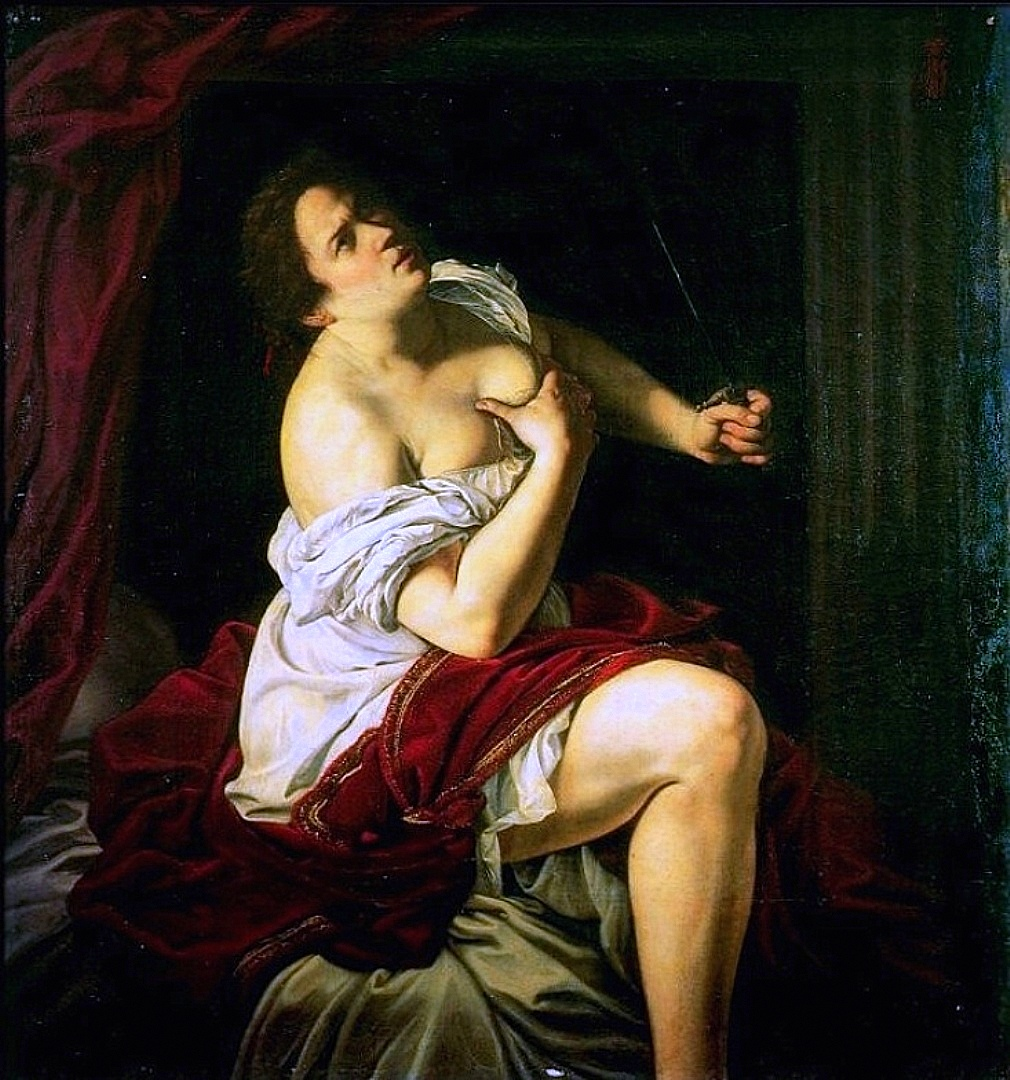
- Artist: Artemisia Gentileschi
- Year: 1623–1625
- Medium: Oil on canvas
- Dimensions: 100 cm (39 in) × 77 cm (30 in)
- Owner: Gerolamo Etro

Lucretia is a painting by the Italian baroque artist Artemisia Gentileschi. It depicts Lucretia, the wife of Roman consul and general Collatinus, at the moment of her suicide. The decision to take her own life was made after she was blackmailed and raped by Sextus Tarquinius, a fellow soldier of Collatinus. It is one of a number of paintings of Gentileschi that focus on virtuous women ill-treated by men.

The painting was painted between 1623 and 1625. It is currently in the collection of Gerolamo Etro, Milan. It is one of several paintings of Lucretia that Gentileschi produced during her career.

It is assumed that this is a self-portrait of the artist.

== Description ==
=== Subject matter ===
Lucretia was an ancient Roman heroine, known for her beauty and modesty. According to legend as documented by Livy in his History of Rome, she was acclaimed as a highly virtuous woman by her husband Collatinus. She was raped by the Roman nobleman Sextus Tarquinius, the youngest son of King Tarquinius the Proud and Tullia Minor and also he was a relative of her husband, who threatened her with murder and the public humiliation of her corpse if she resisted. Given the risk of defamation she gave in to his sexual demands, but afterwards reported the attack to her husband and father before taking her own life. In doing so, she retained her honor and virtue (according to Roman beliefs). Her suicide led to a rebellion that brought down the Etruscan monarchy and marked the beginning of the Roman Republic.

=== Gentileschi's interpretation ===
The painting shows Lucretia in three-quarter view seated alone in a darkened room on a bed, with her eyes cast upwards and a distressed expression. The figure is facing to the right and strongly lit from the left, highlighting her face, exposed chest and right leg, as well as the blade of a dagger. Both the red velvet bedding and her clothes are in disarray, in reference to the recent act of violence. With a powerful and realistic physicality, she grasps her left breast with her right hand, with the dagger in the other. Contemporary depictions of Lucretia by male artists often portrayed her in an erotic manner, while Gentileschi distinguished her work by depicting a brave, anguished woman.

=== Composition ===
A restoration of the painting was undertaken in 1991, which identified significant overpainting. A few years later, strips of canvas which had been added in the late 18th century to all sides of the painting were removed in an attempt to restore it to its original condition. Debate remains however as to whether the excised pieces were original, with some noting that the painting now seems unbalanced in its current form.

== The rape and trial of Artemisia Gentileschi ==
Around May 1611 at the age of 17 years old, Artemisia Gentileschi was raped by Agostino Tassi, a 31-year-old friend and colleague of her father, Orazio Gentileschi. Tassi promised marriage following the rape, which would have spared Artemisia the shame of being considered "impure" according to contemporary standards. However, he declined to uphold his promise and the Gentileschi family took him to court, accusing him of rape and other crimes against the family.

During the trial, Artemisia was subjected to torture as part of her testimony in order to prove she was telling the truth. Metal rings were placed around her fingers and tightened while she spoke, causing agonizing pain and potentially jeopardizing her blossoming painting career. Tassi, on the other hand, was not required to undergo a similar experience and while ultimately convicted and banished, the sentence was not enforced. Like Lucretia, Artemisia Gentileschi made painful sacrifices to maintain her honor and virtue. While some scholars believe that Artemisia would have used her own experience to depict the anguish on the subject's face (which may possibly represent a self-portrait), others observe a woman who, like Artemisia, was determined to choose her own destiny.

== Caravaggio's influence ==
Artemisia Gentileschi is known as one of the most gifted followers of Caravaggio. Her style is characterized by the juxtaposition of extreme darks and lights, also known as chiaroscuro. In Lucretia, Gentileschi distinctly employs this method by contrasting a bright, almost glowing Lucretia against a dark, shadowy setting. This style creates a somber tone while heightening the drama of the scene. The light centered on Lucretia may also symbolize her virtue and purity. Garrard observes a return to this Carravaggesque approach as coincident with her return to Rome from her years in Florence, where she had adopted a maniera style.

== Provenance ==
The painting was known to be in the collection of Pietro Gentile until 1640–1641, hanging in Palazzo Gentile in Genoa alongside her Cleopatra. It remained in the Gentile family collection until the early 19th century, at which point it is recorded in the Adorno collection. It passed to the collection of Piero Pagano in the 1980s, from whom it was purchased in 2001 by the current owner.

== See also ==
- List of works by Artemisia Gentileschi
- Self-portraiture
