= Raymond Ward Bissell =

American art historian and educator (1936–2019)

- Born: Raymond Ward Bissell, Jr. October 23, 1936; New York City, New York, U.S.
- Died: October 26, 2019 (aged 83); Ann Arbor, Michigan, U.S.
- Occupations: Art historian Educator
- Spouse: Tina Goldstein
- Children: 2 (Alex and Kathryn)

Academic background
- Education: University of Michigan
- Thesis: The Baroque Painter, Orazio Gentileschi: His Career in Italy (1966)
- Doctoral advisor: Harold Wethey

Academic work
- Discipline: Art history
- Sub-discipline: Italian Baroque art
- Institutions: University of Wisconsin; University of Michigan

Raymond Ward Bissell, Jr. (October 23, 1936 – October 26, 2019) was an American art historian and educator. A scholar of Italian Baroque art, Bissell was a professor of art history at the University of Michigan.

== Career ==
Born in New York City to Raymond Sr. and Elizabeth Weston, Bissell graduated from Towson High School in 1954. He then received a Bachelor of Arts in 1958 and a Doctor of Philosophy in 1966, both from the University of Michigan. Bissell wrote a doctoral dissertation on the Italian Baroque painter Orazio Gentileschi. He would dedicate the rest of his career to studying that period of art, as well as Orazio's daughter, Artemisia.

While studying at Michigan, Bissell began his teaching career in 1964 as an instructor of art history at the University of Wisconsin. In 1971, Bissell returned to Michigan and was hired as Assistant Professor of Art History. He rose through the professional ranks to become full Professor, and eventually chaired the department. Bissell remained there for the remainder of his career, retiring in 2006.

Bissell was an amateur artist himself and was inspired by the work of Louise Nevelson. He died in Ann Arbor in 2019.

== See also ==
- List of people from New York City
- List of University of Michigan arts alumni
- List of University of Wisconsin–Madison people
