= Esther Before Ahasuerus =

Esther Before Ahasuerus may refer to:

- Esther Before Ahasuerus (Tintoretto)
- Esther Before Ahasuerus (Artemisia Gentileschi)
