= Artemisia Gentileschi =

Italian painter (born 1593)

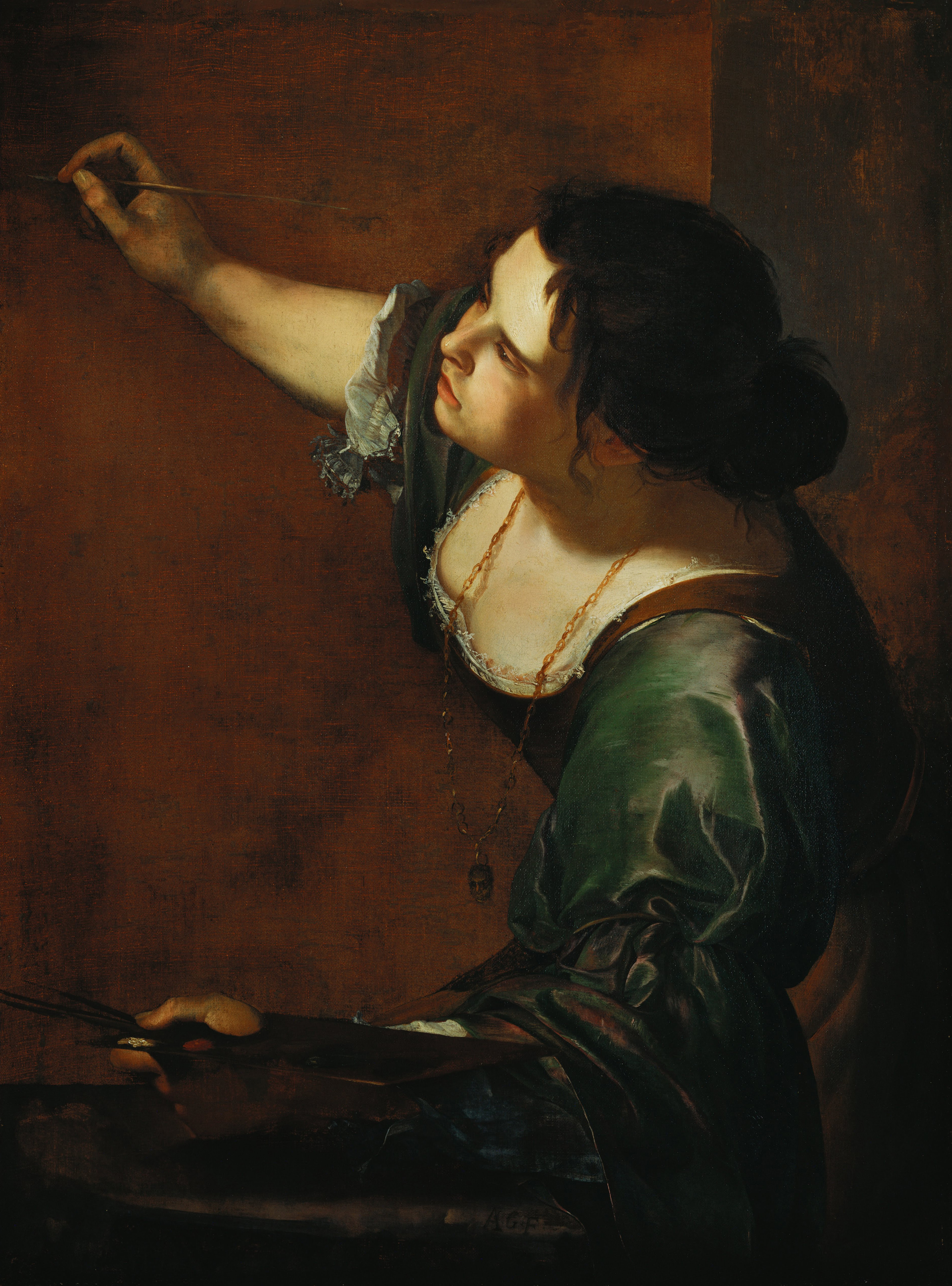
- Self-Portrait as the Allegory of Painting, 1638–39
- Born: Artemisia Lomi Gentileschi; 8 July 1593; Rome, Papal States
- Died: c. 1654 (aged 60–61); Naples, Kingdom of Naples
- Known for: Painting
- Notable work: Susanna and the Elders; Judith and Her Maidservant; Judith Slaying Holofernes; Self-Portrait as the Allegory of Painting
- Style: Italian Baroque; Caravaggisti (early)
- Movement: Accademia delle Arti del Disegno
- Spouse: Pierantonio Stiattesi (m. 1612; sep. 1623)
- Partner: Francesco Maria Maringhi (1616‍–‍1620)
- Children: 5
- Father: Orazio Gentileschi
- Relatives: Francesco Gentileschi (brother); Baccio Lomi (uncle); Aurelio Lomi (uncle)
- Patrons: House of Medici; Michelangelo Buonarroti the Younger; Francesco Maria Maringhi; Cassiano dal Pozzo; Don Antonio Ruffo; Fernando Afán de Ribera, duke of Alcalá de los Gazules

Artemisia Lomi Gentileschi (US: /ˌdʒɛntɪˈlɛski, -tiːˈ-/ JEN-til-ESK-ee, -teel-; Italian: [arteˈmiːzja ˈlɔːmi dʒentiˈleski]; 8 July 1593 – after January 1654) was an Italian Baroque painter. Gentileschi is considered among the most accomplished 17th-century artists, initially working in the style of Caravaggio. She was producing professional work by the age of 15. In an era when women had few opportunities to pursue artistic training or work as professional artists, Gentileschi was the first woman to become a member of the Accademia di Arte del Disegno in Florence and she had an international clientele. Gentileschi worked as an expatriate painter in the court of Charles I of England from 1638 to 1642, but she is thought to have fled the country in the early phases of the English Civil War. Her whereabouts over the following years are unknown, but she resurfaced in Naples during 1649. Her last known letter to one of her mentors was dated to 1650 and it indicates that she was still working as an artist. Her time of death is disputed, but her last known commission was in January 1654.

Many of Gentileschi's paintings feature women from myths, allegories, and the Bible, including victims, suicides, and warriors. Some of her best-known subjects are Susanna and the Elders (particularly the 1610 version, in Schloss Weißenstein, Pommersfelden), Judith Slaying Holofernes (her 1614–1620 version is in the Uffizi gallery), and Judith and Her Maidservant (her 1625 work is in the Detroit Institute of Arts).

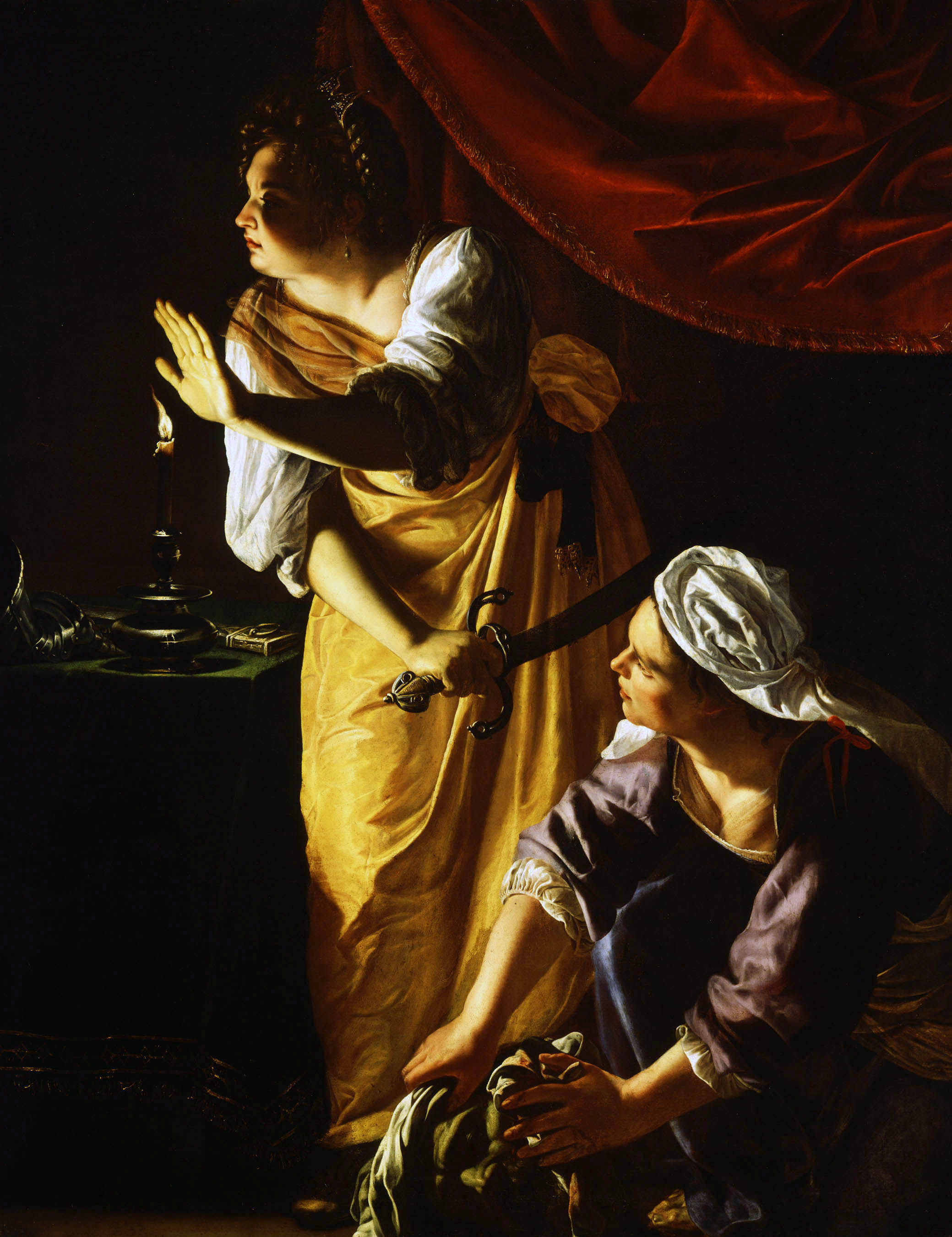
Judith and Her Maidservant, 1625, Detroit Institute of Arts

Gentileschi was known for being able to depict the female figure with great naturalism and for her skill in handling colour to express dimension and drama.

Her achievements as an artist were long overshadowed by the story of her rape at around 18 years old by Agostino Tassi and her being tortured to give evidence during his subsequent trial. For many years Gentileschi was regarded as a curiosity, but her life and art have been reexamined by scholars in the 20th and 21st centuries, with the recognition of her talents exemplified by major exhibitions at internationally esteemed fine art institutions, such as the National Gallery in London.

== Biography ==
=== Early life ===
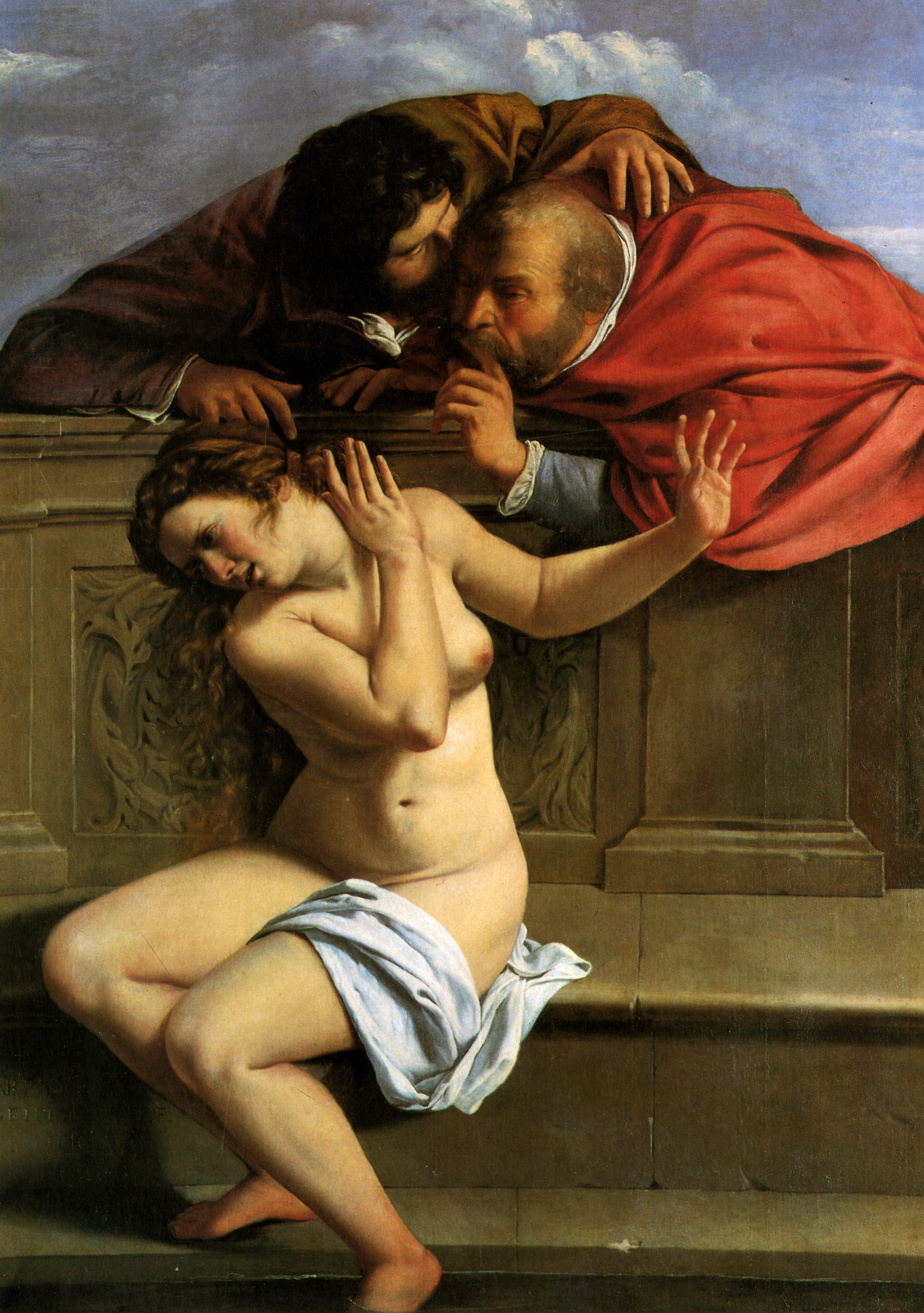
Susanna and the Elders, 1610, earliest of her surviving works, Schönborn Collection, Pommersfelden

Artemisia Lomi Gentileschi was born in Rome on 8 July 1593, although her birth certificate from the Archivio di Stato indicates she was born in 1590. She was the eldest child of Prudenzia di Ottaviano Montoni (c.1575–1605) and the Tuscan painter Orazio Gentileschi, from Pisa. After his arrival in Rome, his painting reached its expressive peak, taking inspiration from the innovations of Caravaggio, from whom he derived the habit of painting real models, without idealising them, instead transfiguring them into figures of powerful and realistic drama.

Baptised two days after her birth in the church of San Lorenzo in Lucina, Gentileschi was primarily raised by her father following the death of her mother in 1605. It was probably at this time that Gentileschi approached painting: introduced to painting in her father's workshop, Gentileschi showed much more enthusiasm and talent than her brothers, who worked alongside her. There she learned how to mix colour and how to paint. By 1612, aged around 19, Gentileschi was known for her exemplary talents, with her father boasting that, despite having only practiced painting for three years, Gentileschi was peerless.

During this early period of her life, Gentileschi took inspiration from her father's painting style, which had in turn been heavily influenced by the work of Caravaggio. Gentileschi's approach to subject matter was different from that of her father, however, taking a highly naturalistic approach over her father's comparatively idealized works.

Artemisia Gentileschi’s training in her father’s workshop reflects the typical structure of artistic education in early seventeenth-century Italy. At this time, most artists were trained through apprenticeships within workshops, but women were rarely allowed to enter formal apprenticeships or join professional guilds. As a result, female artists often learned painting skills through family members who were already established in the profession. Art historian Mary D. Garrard notes that Gentileschi developed technical skill at an early age and was able to work independently while still living in her father’s household. Although this training provided valuable experience, social and institutional barriers continued to limit women’s participation in the professional art world.

Her earliest surviving work, completed aged 17, is Susanna and the Elders (1610, Schönborn collection in Pommersfelden). The painting depicts the Biblical story of Susanna. The painting shows how Gentileschi assimilated the realism of and effects used by Caravaggio without being indifferent to the classicism of Annibale Carracci and the Bolognese School of Baroque style.

=== Rape by Agostino Tassi ===
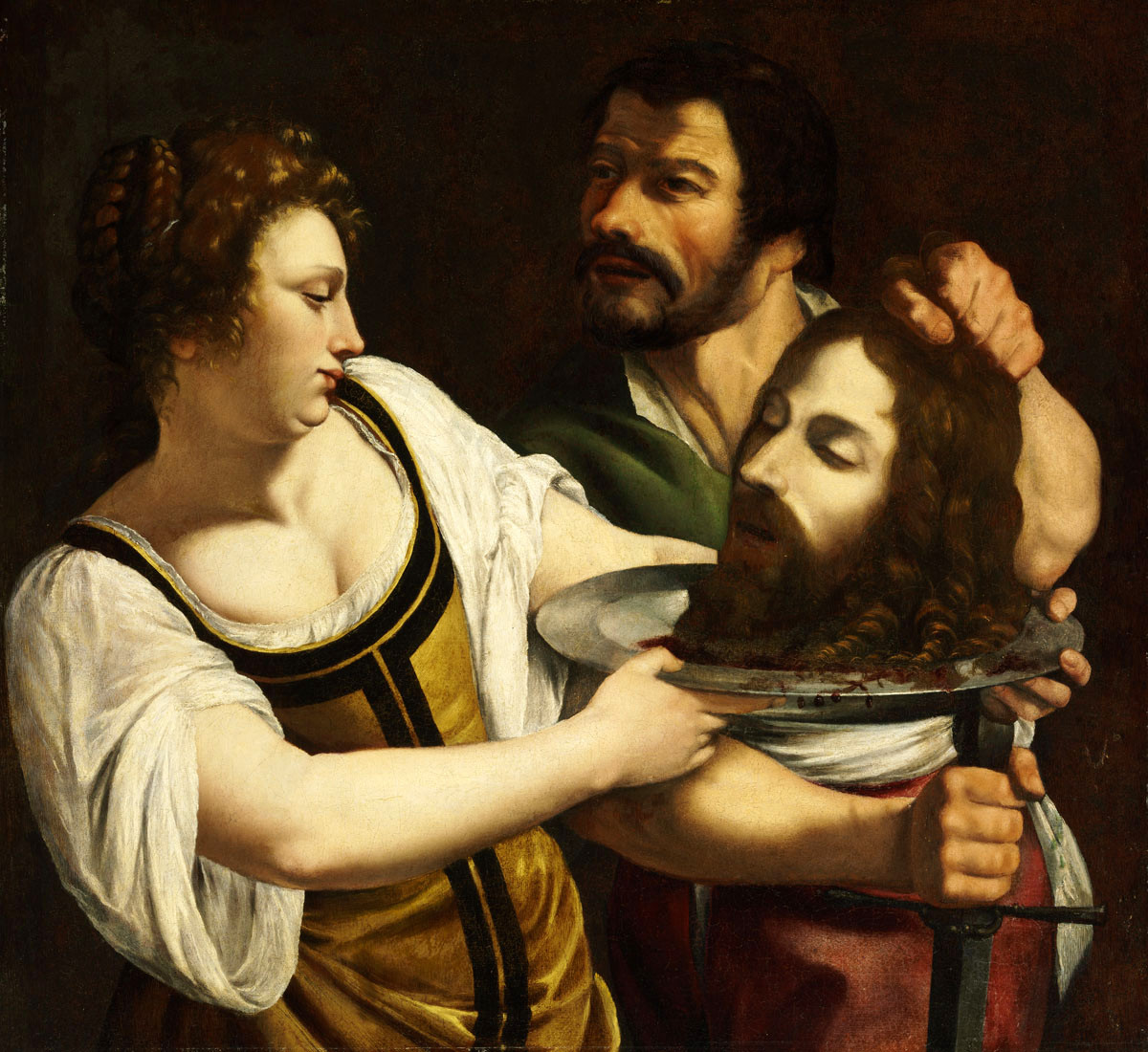
Salome with the Head of Saint John the Baptist, c. 1610–1615, Museum of Fine Arts, Budapest

In 1611, Orazio was working with fellow painter Agostino Tassi to decorate the vaults of Casino delle Muse inside the Palazzo Pallavicini-Rospigliosi in Rome. Around this time, Orazio had rented the upstairs apartment of their home to a female tenant, Donna Tuzia. Orazio recruited Tuzia to act as a "chaperone" or "guardian" for his daughter, Gentileschi being a younger woman without the guidance of a mother. During this time, Tuzia allowed Tassi and his friend Cosimo Quorli, a minor papal official, to visit Gentileschi in Gentileschi's home on multiple occasions. Tuzia later testified that Tassi, though initially "devoted" to Gentileschi, grew increasingly obsessed with her.

One day in May, Tassi visited the Gentileschi household and, when alone with Gentileschi, raped her. Quorli, who had himself likely previously attempted to rape her, was also implicated in the assault, accused of acting as Tassi's accomplice. (Note: "Quorli, a mysterious figure who died within a month of the trial's opening, never testified. Witnesses said that he played a pivotal role as a troublemaker in the events surrounding the rape, but the allegations are not easily sorted out or tested. Quorli, much entangled with Tassi in both business and pleasure, is said first to have promoted his seduction of Artemisia and later to have discouraged their marriage.")

Gentileschi later testified that she tried to fight back against Tassi, scratching his face and unsuccessfully attempting to attack him with a knife, and that she cried out to Tuzia for help, which went unanswered. Art historian Jeanne Morgan Zarucchi compared Tuzia's betrayal and role in facilitating the rape to the role of a procuress who is complicit in the sexual exploitation of a prostitute.

In the aftermath of the assault, Tassi demanded to have further sexual relations with Gentileschi, on the promise that they would marry, thereby restoring her virtue and securing her future. Gentileschi agreed to this arrangement, but Tassi later reneged on the promise to marry her. Unbeknownst to Gentileschi, Tassi was already married, albeit estranged from his wife. Nine months after the rape, when he learned that Gentileschi and Tassi were not going to be married, her father Orazio pressed charges against Tassi.

As was typical of the time, the major issue of the trial was the fact that Tassi had violated the Gentileschi family's honor, and not the fact that he had violated Gentileschi herself. In the words of history professor Elizabeth S. Cohen: "The law gauged damage to economic and social assets rather than suffering and psychological trauma."

During the ensuing seven-month trial, it was discovered that Tassi had planned to murder his wife, had engaged in adultery with his sister-in-law, and planned to steal some of Orazio's paintings. During the trial, Gentileschi was tortured with a "sibille", cords wrapped around the fingers and pulled tight (similar to thumbscrews), for the purpose of verifying her testimony (a common practice at the time). As the cords tighten, she is recorded as turning to Tassi and saying: "This is the ring that you give me and these are your promises."

At the end of the trial, Tassi was convicted and sentenced to exile from Rome, although this punishment was never carried out, and he ultimately spent less than a year in prison.

Art historians have noted that the trial has been widely discussed in relation to Gentileschi’s artistic development and later subject matter. Some scholars, including Mary D. Garrard, have argued that the public nature of the trial and its emphasis on female honor reflect broader social attitudes toward women in early modern Italy. Garrard has also examined how Gentileschi’s early painting Susanna and the Elders has been interpreted as offering a distinct perspective on female vulnerability and resistance when compared to earlier depictions of the subject by male artists. These interpretations have contributed to ongoing scholarly debate about the relationship between Gentileschi’s personal experiences and the themes of female agency and violence that appear in several of her later works.

A painting entitled Mother and Child, discovered in Crow's Nest, Australia, in 1976, may or may not have been painted by Gentileschi. On the presumption that it is her work, the baby has been interpreted as an indirect reference to Tassi, as it dates to 1614, just two years after his conviction. It depicts a strong and suffering woman and casts light on her anguish and expressive artistic capability.

=== Florentine period (1612–1620) ===
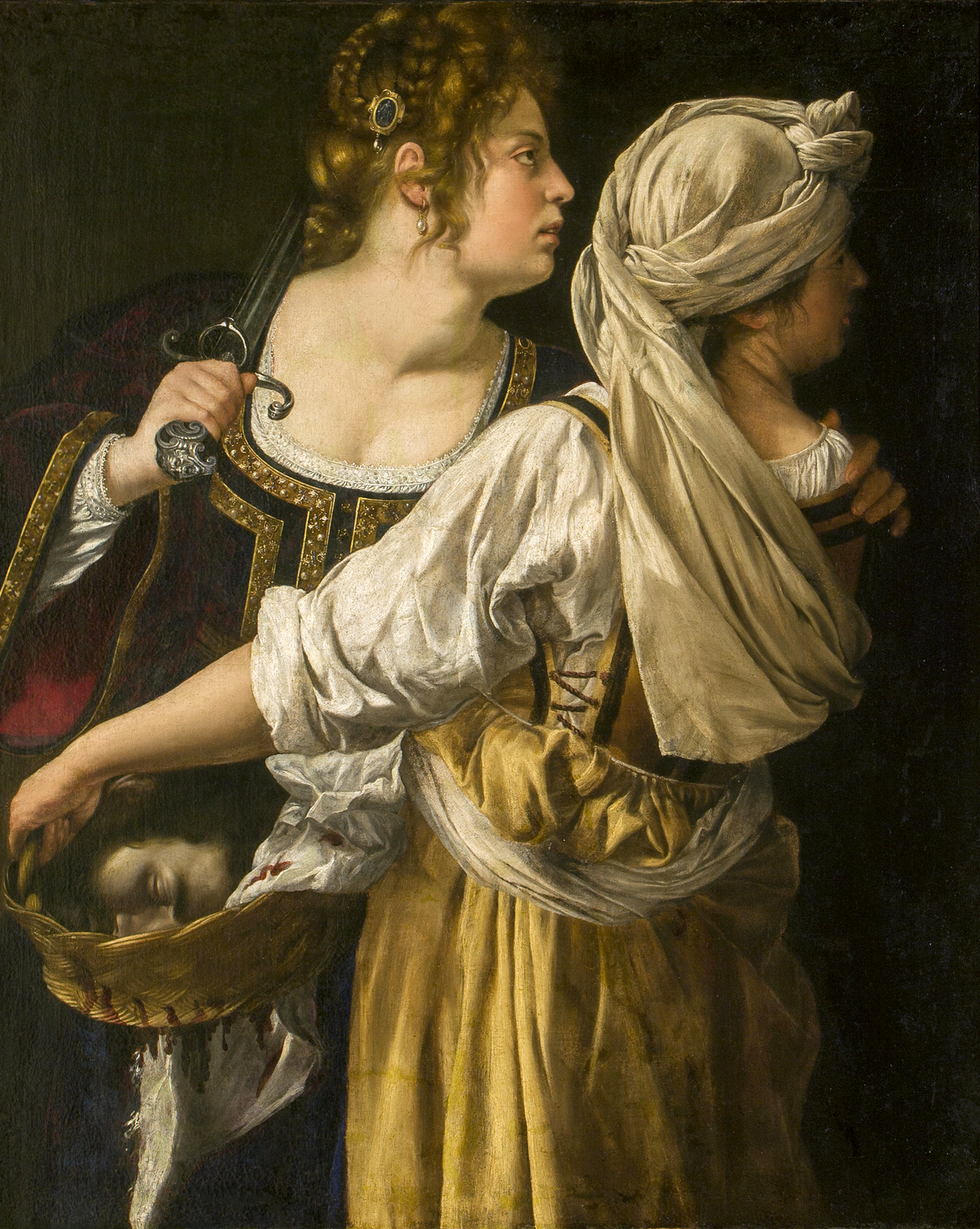
Judith and Her Maidservant, 1613–14, Palazzo Pitti, Florence

A month after the trial, Orazio arranged for his daughter to marry Pierantonio Stiattesi, a modest artist from Florence. Shortly afterward the couple moved to Florence. The six years she spent in Florence would be decisive both for Gentileschi's family life and professional career. Gentileschi became a successful court painter, enjoying the patronage of the House of Medici, and playing a significant role in courtly culture of the city.

Gentileschi’s acceptance into the Accademia delle Arti del Disegno marked an important institutional achievement, as women were rarely granted membership in artistic academies in early modern Italy. Art historian Mary Garrard notes that such institutions played a central role in defining professional artistic status and were typically structured around male participation. Her membership therefore reflects both her technical skill and the exceptional nature of her professional recognition within a gender-restricted artistic system. She maintained good relations with the most respected artists of her time, such as Cristofano Allori, and was able to garner the favour and the protection of influential people, beginning with Cosimo II de' Medici, Grand Duke of Tuscany, and especially of the Grand Duchess, Christina of Lorraine. Her acquaintance with Galileo Galilei, evident from a letter she wrote to the scientist in 1635, appears to stem from her Florentine years; indeed it may have stimulated her depiction of the compass in the Allegory of Inclination.

Her involvement in the courtly culture of Florence not only provided access to patrons, but it widened her education and exposure to the arts. She learned to read and write and became familiar with musical and theatrical performances. Such artistic spectacles helped Gentileschi's approach to depicting lavish clothing in her paintings: "Artemisia understood that the representation of biblical or mythological figures in contemporary dress ... was an essential feature of the spectacle of courtly life."

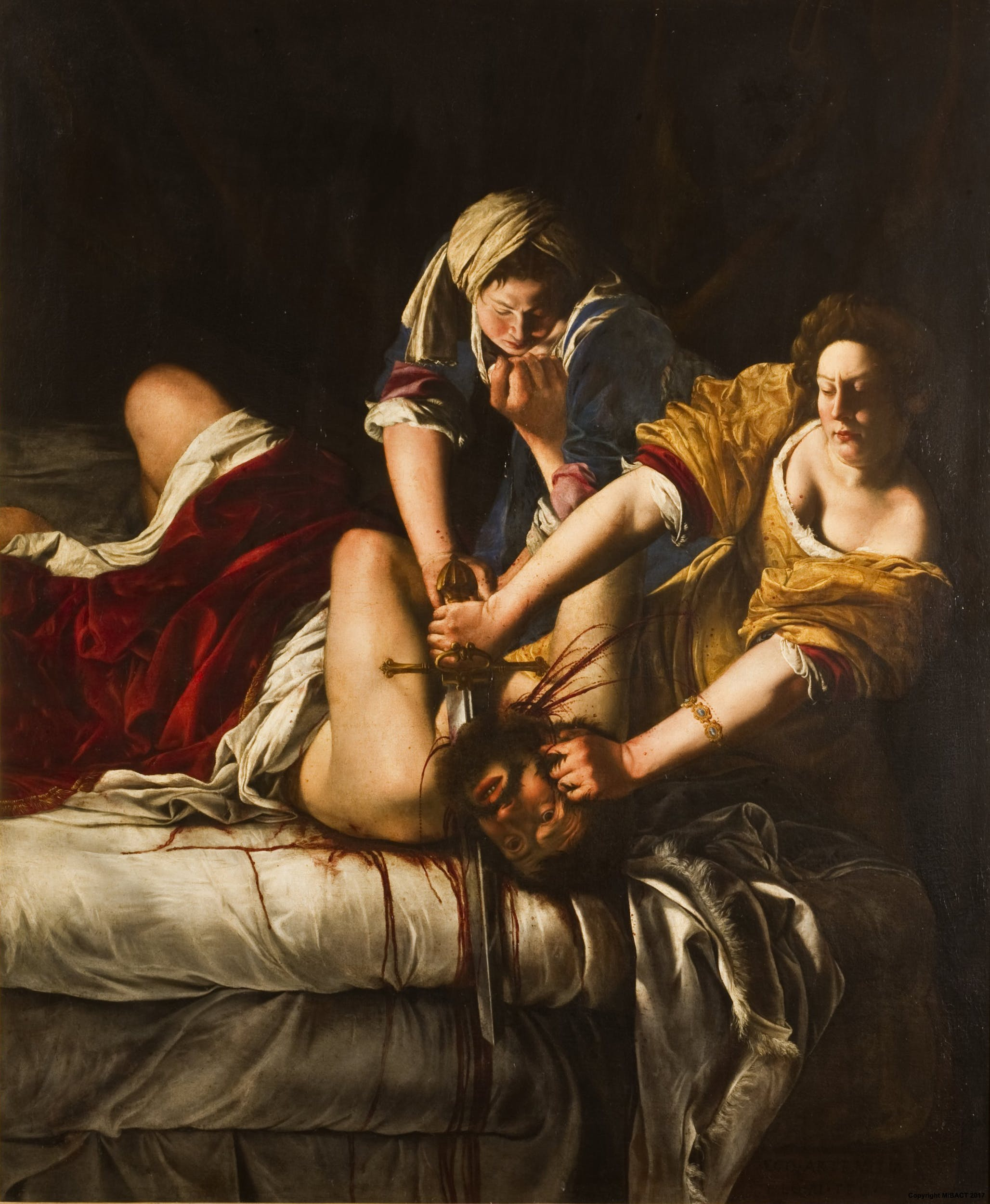
Judith Slaying Holofernes, 1614–1620, 199×162 cm, Galleria degli Uffizi, Florence

In 1615, she received the attention of Michelangelo Buonarroti the Younger (a great-nephew of Michelangelo). Busy with the construction of the Casa Buonarroti to celebrate his noted relative, he asked Gentileschi —along with other Florentine artists, including Agostino Ciampelli, Sigismondo Coccapani, Giovan Battista Guidoni, and Zanobi Rosi — to contribute a painting for the ceiling. Gentileschi was then in an advanced state of pregnancy. Each artist was commissioned to present an allegory of a virtue associated with Michelangelo, and Gentileschi was assigned the Allegory of Inclination. In this instance, Gentileschi was paid three times more than any other artist participating in the series. Gentileschi painted her commission in the form of a nude young woman holding a compass. Her painting is located on the Galleria ceiling on the second floor. It is believed that the subject bears a resemblance to Gentileschi. Indeed, in several of her paintings, Gentileschi's energetic heroines appear to be self-portraits.

Other significant works from this period include La Conversione della Maddalena (The Conversion of the Magdalene), Self-Portrait as a Lute Player (in the collection of the Wadsworth Atheneum Museum of Art), and Giuditta con la sua ancella (Judith and her Maidservant), now in the Palazzo Pitti. Gentileschi painted a second version of Judith beheading Holofernes, which now is housed in the Uffizi Gallery of Florence. Her first Judith Beheading Holofernes (1612–13), smaller in size, is displayed in the Museo di Capodimonte, Naples. In fact, she was fascinated with this subject and six variations of Judith Beheading Holofernes by Gentileschi are known to exist.

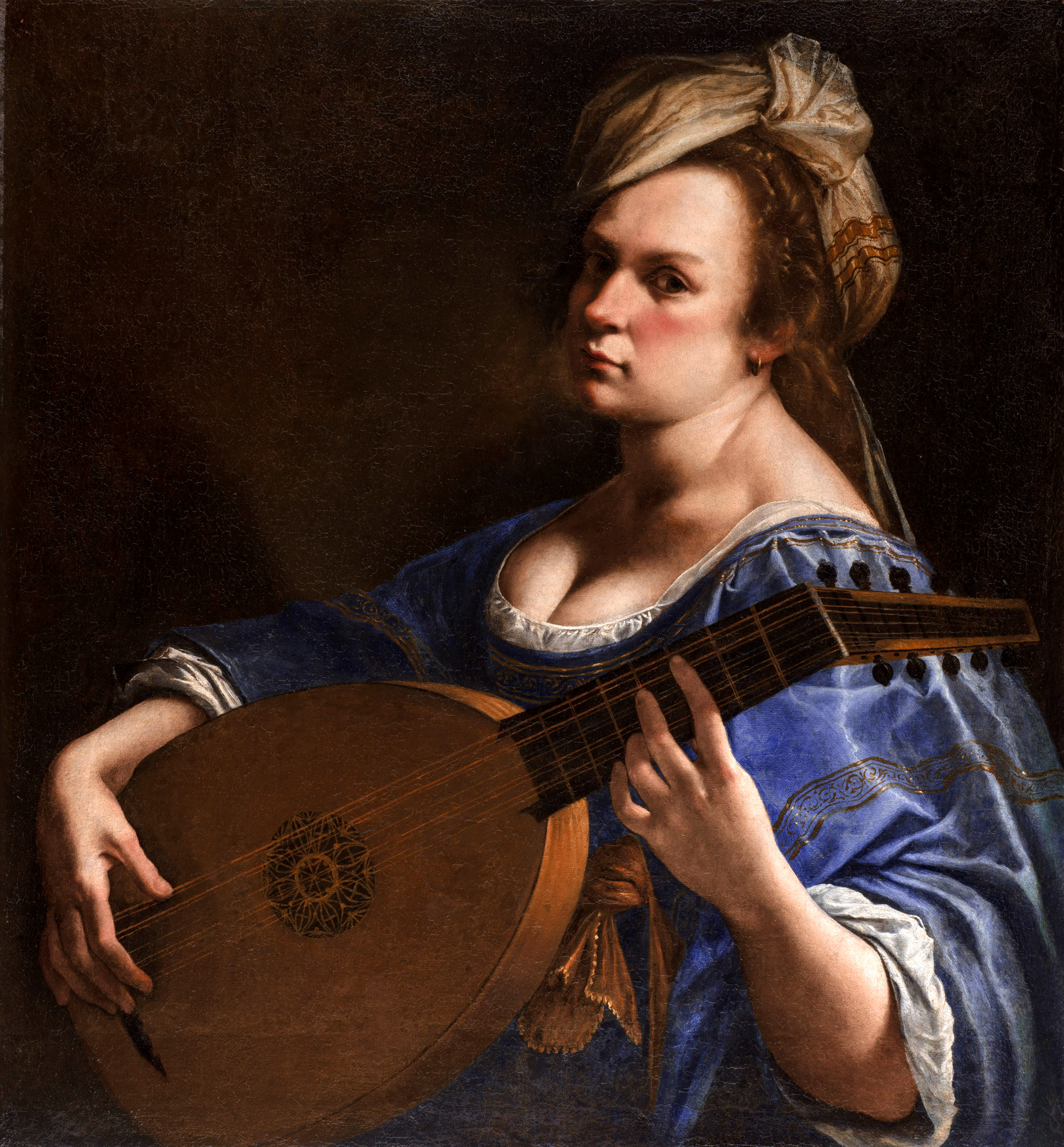
Self-Portrait as a Lute Player, 1615–1617

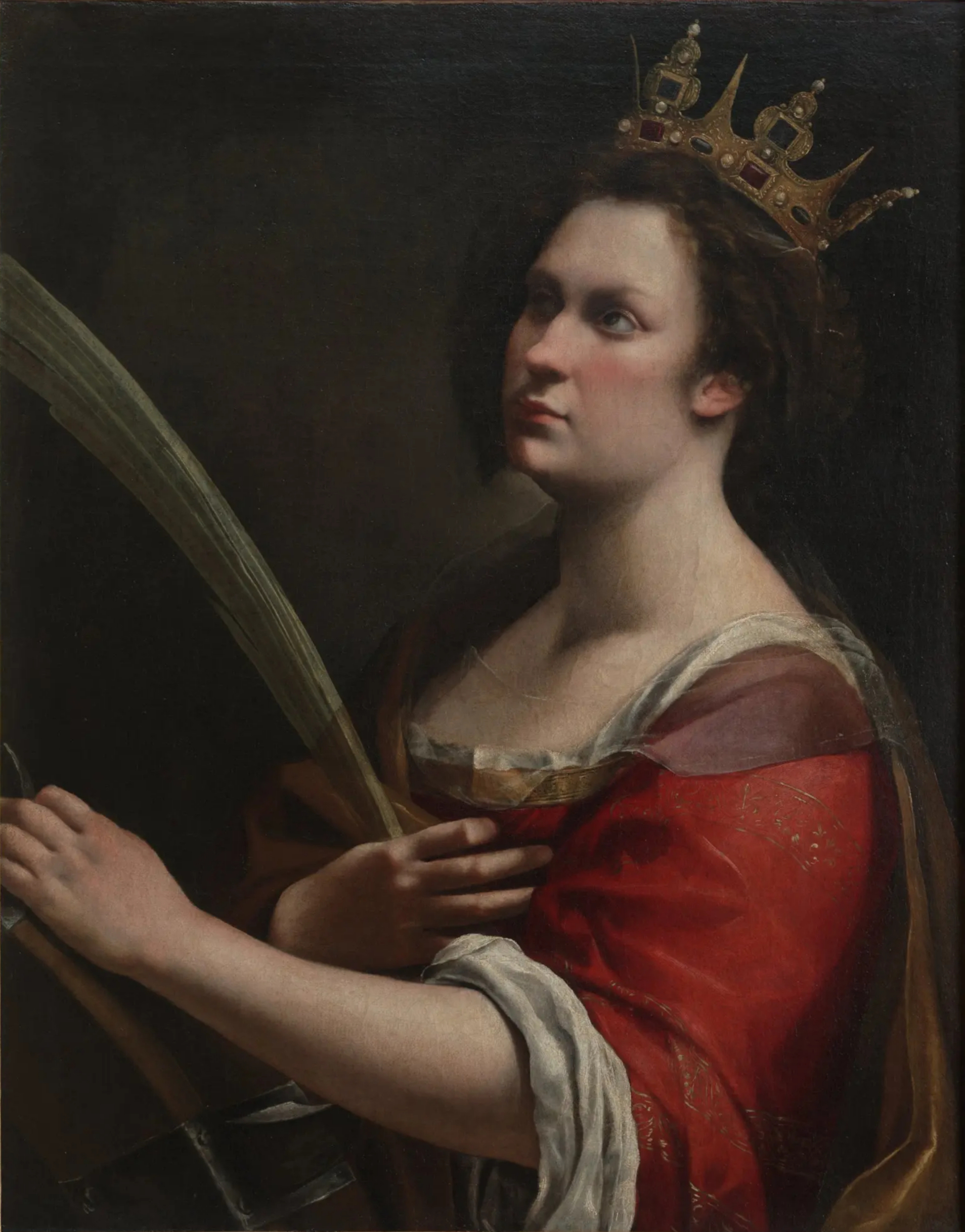
Self-portrait as Saint Catherine of Alexandria, 1619

While in Florence, Gentileschi and Pierantonio had five children. Giovanni Battista, Agnola, and Lisabella did not survive for more than a year. Their second son, Cristofano, died at the age of five after Gentileschi had returned to Rome. Only Prudentia survived into adulthood. Prudentia was also known as Palmira, which has led some scholars to conclude erroneously that Gentileschi had a sixth child. Prudentia was named after Gentileschi's mother. It is known that Gentileschi's daughter was a painter and was trained by her mother, although nothing is known of her work.

In 2011, Francesco Solinas discovered a collection of 36 letters, dating from about 1616 to 1620, that add startling context to the personal and financial life of the Gentileschi family in Florence. They show that Gentileschi had a passionate love affair with a wealthy Florentine nobleman, Francesco Maria Maringhi. Her husband, Pierantonio Stiattesi, was well aware of their relationship and he maintained a correspondence with Maringhi on the back of Gentileschi's love letters. He tolerated it, presumably because Maringhi was a powerful ally who provided the couple with financial support. However, by 1620, rumours of the affair had begun to spread in the Florentine court and this, combined with ongoing legal and financial problems, led the couple to relocate to Rome.

=== Return to Rome (1620–1626/27) ===
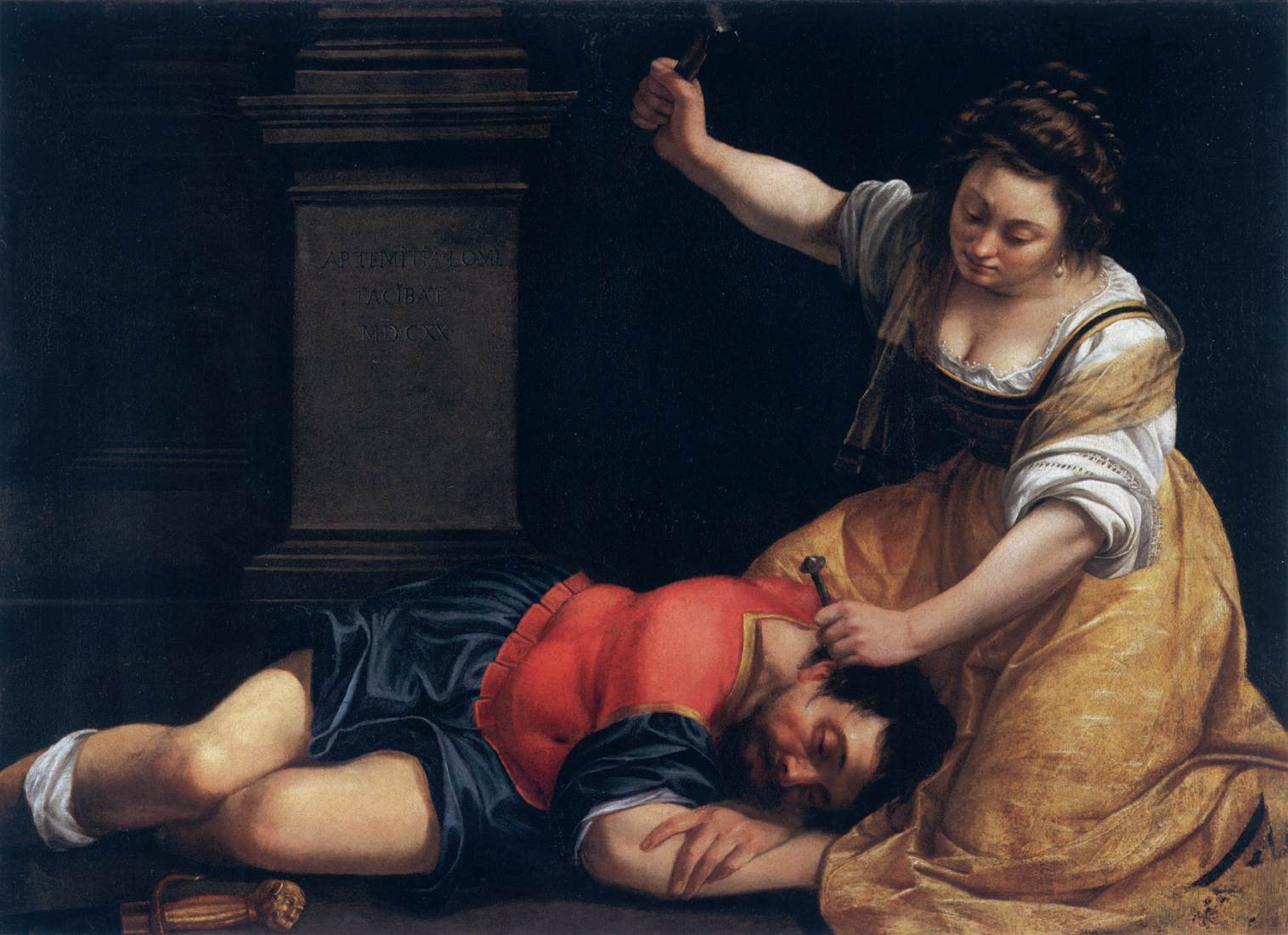
Jael and Sisera, c. 1620

Just as with the preceding decade, the early 1620s saw ongoing upheaval in Artemisia Gentileschi's life. Her son Cristofano died. Just as she arrived in Rome, her father Orazio departed for Genoa. Immediate contact with her lover Maringhi appeared to have lessened. By 1623, any mention of her husband disappears from any surviving documentation.

Her arrival in Rome offered the opportunity to cooperate with other painters and to seek patronage from the wide network of art collectors in the city, opportunities that Gentileschi grasped. One art historian noted of the period, "Artemisia's Roman career quickly took off, the money problems eased". Large-scale papal commissions were largely off-limits, however. Art historians have noted that Gentileschi's career was shaped by structural limitations that limited women artists' access to prestigious public commissions, particularly those sponsored by papal institutions. According to Mary Garrard, these limitations were not based solely on artistic ability but also on gendered assumptions about women’s capacity to execute large decorative cycles. As a result, Gentileschi relied more heavily on private patronage networks, which differed significantly from the institutional support she had previously experienced in Florence under Medici patronage.The long papacy of Urban VIII showed a preference for large-scale decorative works and altarpieces, typified by the baroque style of Pietro da Cortona. Gentileschi's training in easel paintings, and perhaps the suspicion that women painters did not have the energy to carry out large-scale painting cycles, meant that the ambitious patrons within Urban's circle commissioned other artists.

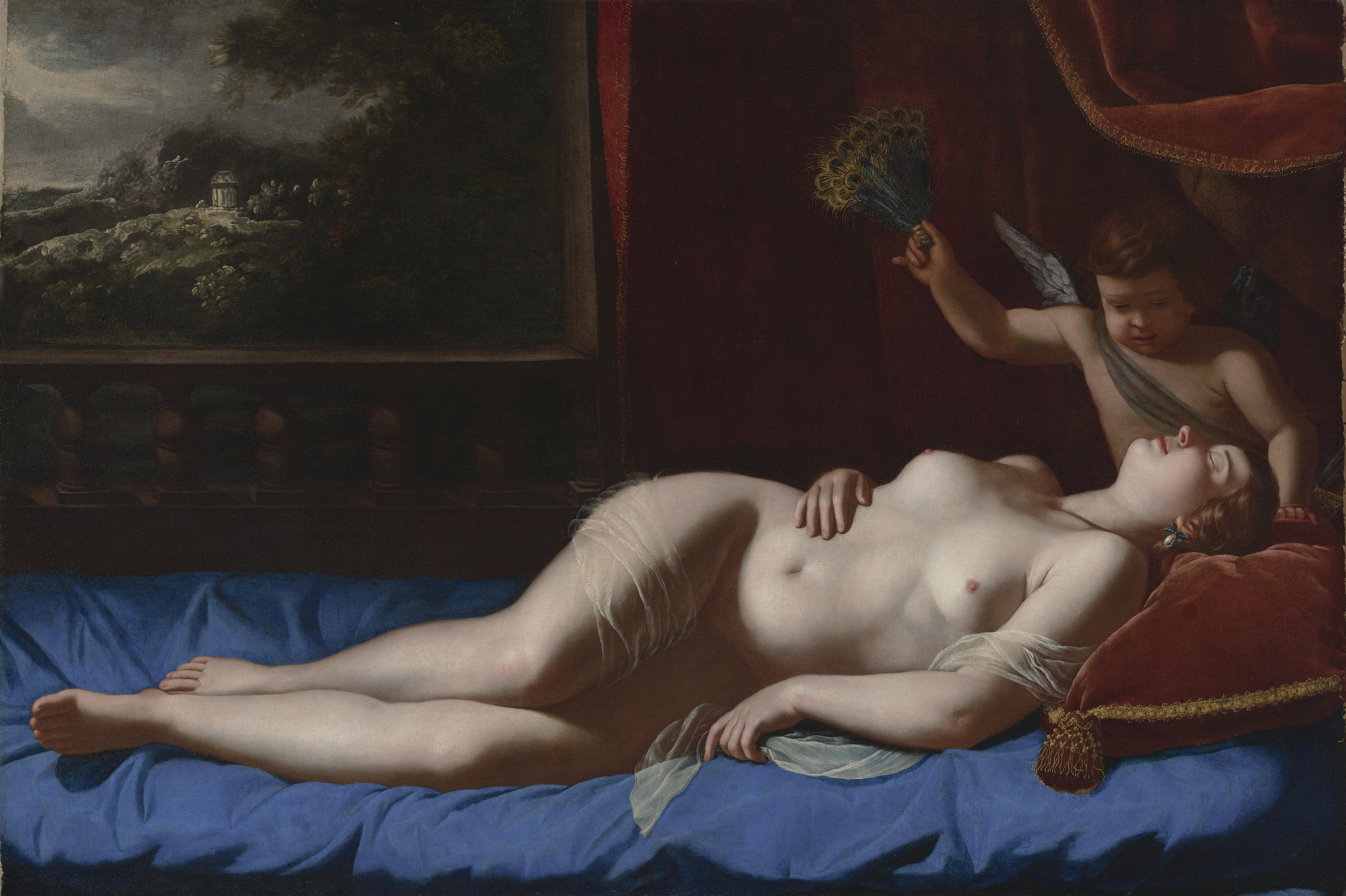
Venus and Cupid, c. 1625–1630, Virginia Museum of Fine Arts

But Rome hosted a wide range of patrons. Fernando Afan de Ribera, 3rd Duke of Alcala, a Spanish nobleman, acquired her Penitent Magdalene, Christ Blessing the Children, and David with a Harp. During the same period she became associated with Cassiano dal Pozzo, a humanist and a collector and lover of arts. Dal Pozzo helped to forge relationships with other artists and patrons. Her reputation grew. The visiting French artist Pierre Dumonstier II produced a black and red chalk drawing of her right hand in 1625.

The variety of patrons in Rome also meant a variety of styles. Caravaggio's style remained highly influential and converted many painters to following his style (the so-called Caravaggisti), such as Carlo Saraceni (who returned to Venice in 1620), Bartolomeo Manfredi, and Simon Vouet. Gentileschi and Vouet would go on to have a professional relationship and would influence each other's styles. Vouet would go on to complete a portrait of Gentileschi. She also interacted with the Bentveughels group of Flemish and Dutch painters living in Rome. The Bolognese School (particularly during the 1621 to 1623 period of Gregory XV) also began to grow in popularity, and her Susanna and the Elders (1622) often is associated with the style introduced by Guercino.

Although it is sometimes difficult to date her paintings, it is possible to assign certain works by Gentileschi to these years, such as Portrait of a Gonfaloniere, today in Bologna (a rare example of her capacity as portrait painter), and Judith and Her Maidservant, today in the Detroit Institute of Arts. The Detroit painting is notable for her mastery of chiaroscuro and tenebrism (the effects of extreme lights and darks), techniques for which Gerrit van Honthorst and many others in Rome were famous.

==== Three years in Venice (1626/27–1630) ====
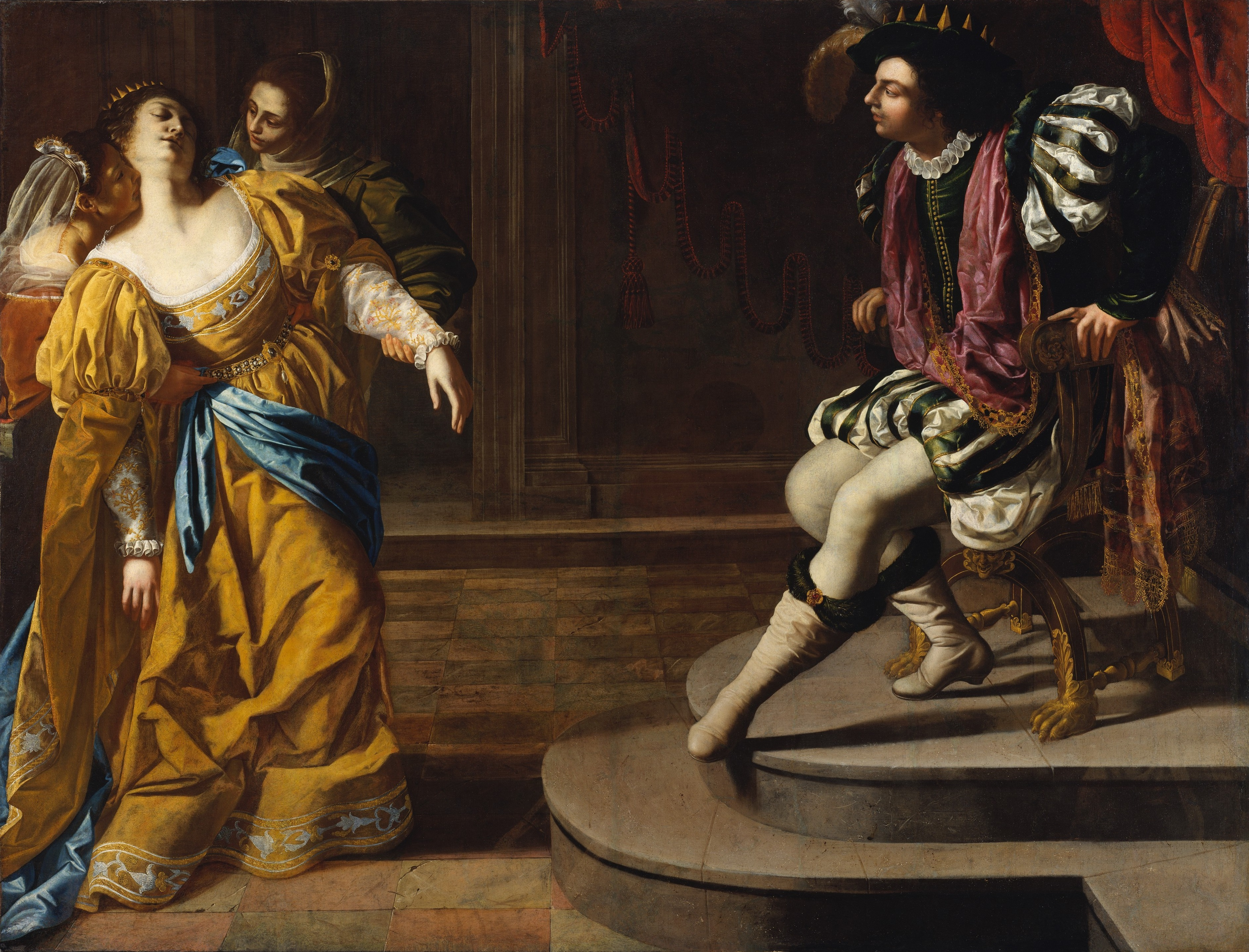
Esther before Ahasuerus, c. 1628–1635

The absence of sufficient documentation makes it difficult to follow Gentileschi's movements in the late 1620s. However, it is certain that between 1626 and 1627, she moved to Venice, perhaps in search of richer commissions. Many verses and letters were composed in appreciation of her and her works in Venice. Knowledge of her commissions during the time is vague, but her The Sleeping Venus, today in the Virginia Museum of Fine Arts, Richmond, and her Esther before Ahasuerus, now in the Metropolitan Museum of Art in New York, are testaments to her assimilation of the lessons of Venetian colourism.

=== Naples and the English period (1630–1654) ===
In 1630, Gentileschi moved to Naples, a city rich with workshops and art lovers, in search of new and more lucrative job opportunities. With the exceptions of a brief trip to London and some other journeys, Gentileschi resided in Naples for the remainder of her career. The 18th-century biographer Bernardo de' Dominici speculated that Gentileschi was already known in Naples before her arrival. She may have been invited to Naples by the Duke of Alcalá, who had bought three of her paintings in Rome. Many other artists, including Caravaggio, Annibale Carracci, and Simon Vouet, had stayed in Naples at some time in their lives. At that time, Jusepe de Ribera, Massimo Stanzione, and Domenichino were working there, and later, Giovanni Lanfranco and many other artists went to the city. Gentileschi's Neapolitan debut is represented by the Annunciation in the Capodimonte Museum. Painted shortly after her arrival in Naples, The Sleeping Christ Child is one of only three copper works by Gentileschi known to exist, although she made small works on copper throughout her career.

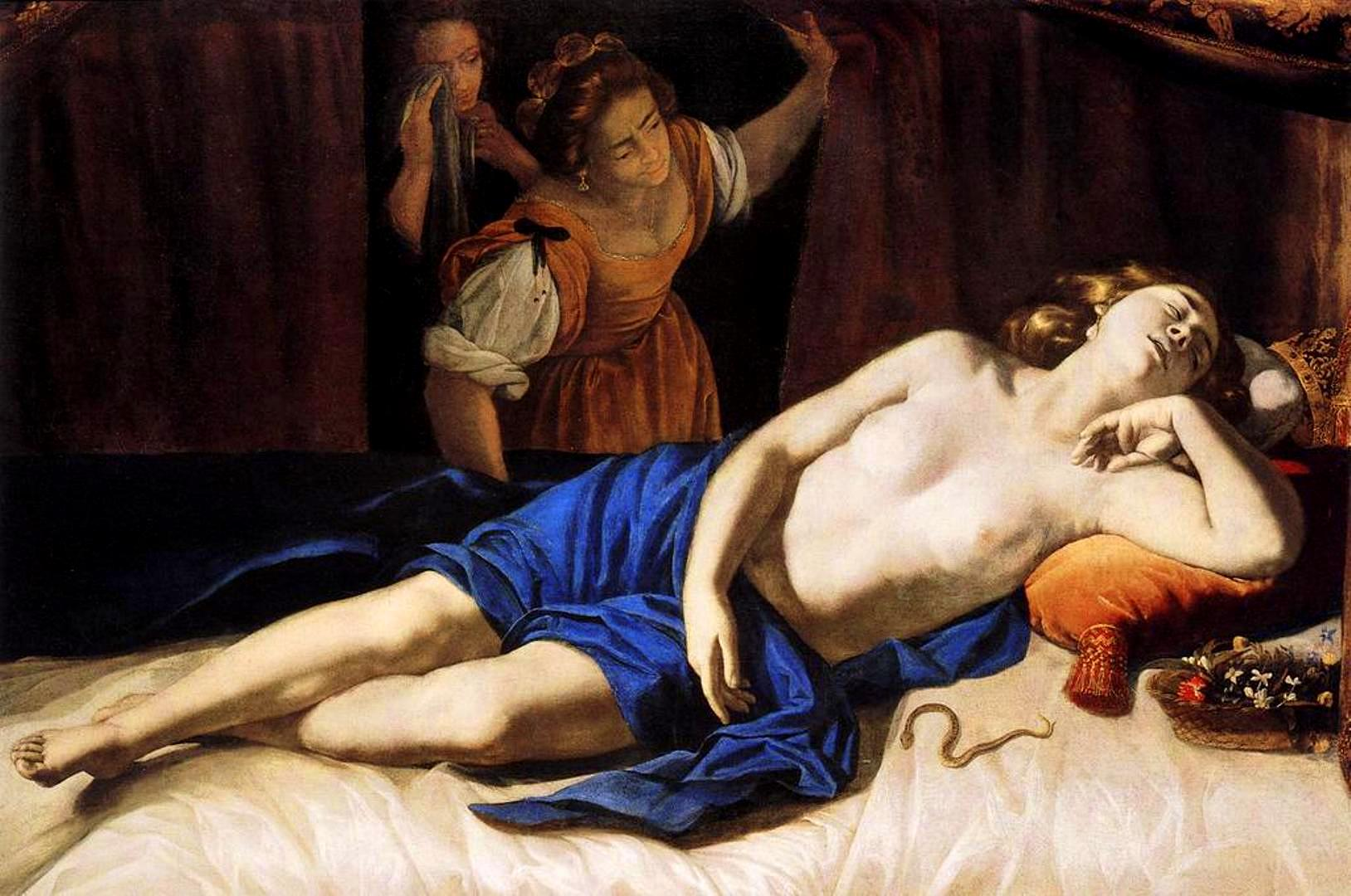
Cleopatra, 1633–1635

On 18 March 1634, the traveller Bullen Reymes recorded in his diary visiting Gentileschi and her daughter, Palmira ('who also paints'), with a group of fellow-Englishmen. She had relations with many renowned artists, among them Stanzione, with whom, Bernardo de' Dominici reports, she started an artistic collaboration based on a real friendship and artistic similarities. Gentileschi's work influenced Stanzione's use of colours, as seen in his Assumption of the Virgin, c. 1630. De' Dominici states that "Stanzione learned how to compose an istoria from Domenichino, but learned his coloring from Artemisia".

In Naples, Gentileschi started working on paintings in a cathedral for the first time. They are dedicated to San Gennaro nell'anfiteatro di Pozzuoli (Saint Januarius in the amphitheater of Pozzuoli) in Pozzuoli. During her first Neapolitan period she painted the Birth of Saint John the Baptist now in the Prado in Madrid, and Corisca e il satiro (Corisca and the Satyr), today in a private collection. In these paintings, Gentileschi again demonstrates her ability to adapt to the novelties of the period and to handle different subjects, instead of the usual Judith, Susanna, Bathsheba, and Penitent Magdalenes, for which she already was known.

From the mid-1630s through the 1650s, Gentileschi ran a productive workshop in Naples, managing assistants on large-scale narrative commissions. Paintings such as Bathsheba at Her Bath and Israelites Celebrating the Return of David are understood to have been produced within this collaborative workshop context. While Gentileschi focused on principal figures and dramatic gestures that preserved her distinctive style, assistants contributed to secondary elements such as architecture, landscape, and textiles. This division of labor reflects Gentileschi's role as both an artist and a workshop director responding to sustained demand in Naples. She collaborated with the artist Onofrio Palumbo, who acted as a foreman or business inspector. As a result, the attribution of some works from this period remains debated, with certain paintings understood as collaborative productions rather than the work of a single hand.

In 1638, Gentileschi joined her father in London at the court of Charles I of England, where Orazio had become court painter and received the important job of decorating a ceiling allegory of Triumph of Peace and the Arts in the Queen's House, Greenwich built for Queen Henrietta Maria. Father and daughter were working together once again, although helping her father probably was not her only reason for travelling to London: Charles I had invited her to his court. Charles I was an enthusiastic collector, willing to incur criticism for his spending on art. The fame of Gentileschi probably intrigued him, and it is not a coincidence that his collection included a painting of great suggestion, the Self-Portrait as the Allegory of Painting (which is the lead image of this article).

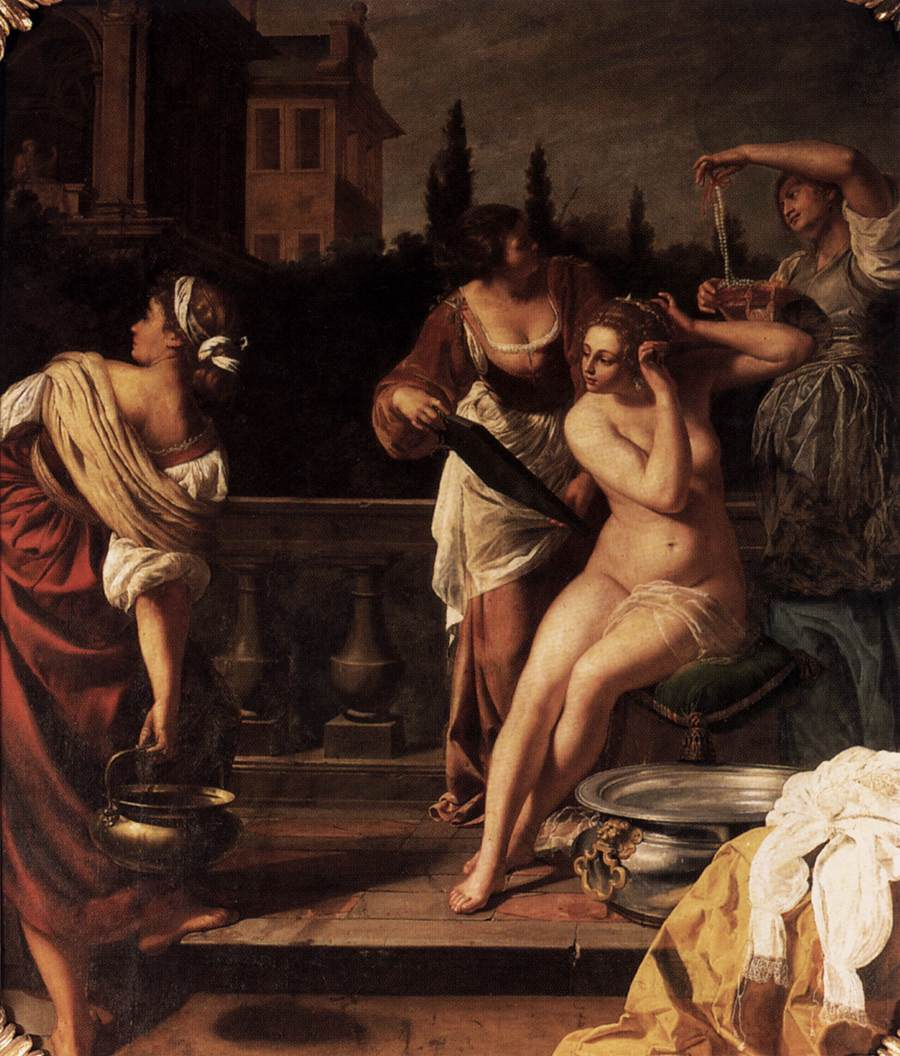
Bathsheba, c. 1645–1650, Neues Palais, Potsdam

Orazio died suddenly in 1639. Gentileschi had her own commissions to fulfil after her father's death, although there are no known works assignable with certainty to this period. It is known that Gentileschi had left England by 1642, when the English Civil War was just starting. Nothing much is known about her subsequent movements. Historians know that in 1649 she was in Naples again, corresponding with Don Antonio Ruffo of Sicily, who became her mentor during this second Neapolitan period. The last known letter to her mentor is dated 1650 and makes clear that she still was fully active.

In her last known years of activity she is attributed with works that are probably commissions and follow a traditional representation of the feminine in her works.

It was once believed that Gentileschi died in 1652 or 1653; however, modern evidence has shown that she was still accepting commissions in 1654, although she was increasingly dependent upon her assistant, Onofrio Palumbo. Some have speculated that she died in the devastating plague that swept Naples in 1656 and virtually wiped out an entire generation of Neapolitan artists. She was buried at San Giovanni Battista dei Fiorentini in Naples, but her tomb was destroyed in the 1950s when the church was demolished.

Some works in this period are the Susanna and the Elders (1649) today in Brno, the Virgin and Child with a Rosary today in El Escorial, the David and Bathsheba today in Columbus, Ohio, and the Bathsheba today in Leipzig. Her David with the Head of Goliath, rediscovered in London in 2020, has been attributed by art historian Gianni Papi to Gentileschi's London period. Another work, Susanna And The Elders, previously owned by Charles I, was rediscovered in the Royal Collection in London in 2023.

== Artistic importance ==
The research paper "Gentileschi, padre e figlia" (1916) by Roberto Longhi, an Italian critic, described Gentileschi as "the only woman in Italy who ever knew about painting, coloring, drawing, and other fundamentals". Longhi also wrote of Judith Slaying Holofernes: "There are about fifty-seven works by Artemisia Gentileschi and 94% (forty-nine works) feature women as protagonists or equal to men". These include her works of Jael and Sisera, Judith and her Maidservant, and Esther. These characters intentionally lacked the stereotypical "feminine" traits—sensitivity, timidness, and weakness—and were courageous, rebellious, and powerful personalities (such subjects are now grouped under the name the Power of Women). A 19th-century critic commented on Gentileschi's Magdalene stating, "no one would have imagined that it was the work of a woman. The brush work was bold and certain, and there was no sign of timidness". In Raymond Ward Bissell's view, she was well aware of how women and female artists were viewed by men, explaining why her works were so bold and defiant in the beginning of her career.

Longhi wrote:

Who could think in fact that over a sheet so candid, a so brutal and terrible massacre could happen [...] but—it's natural to say—this is a terrible woman! A woman painted all this? ... there's nothing sadistic here, instead what strikes the most is the impassibility of the painter, who was even able to notice how the blood, spurting with violence, can decorate with two drops the central spurt! Incredible I tell you! And also please give Mrs. Schiattesi—the conjugal name of Artemisia—the chance to choose the hilt of the sword! At last don't you think that the only aim of Giuditta is to move away to avoid the blood which could stain her dress? We think anyway that that is a dress of Casa Gentileschi, the finest wardrobe in Europe during 1600, after Van Dyck."

Feminist studies increased the interest in Artemisia Gentileschi, underlining her rape and subsequent mistreatment, and the expressive strength of her paintings of biblical heroines, in which the women are interpreted as willing to manifest their rebellion against their condition. In a research paper from the catalogue of the exhibition "Orazio e Artemisia Gentileschi", which took place in Rome in 2001 (and after in New York), Judith W. Mann critiques feminist opinion of Gentileschi, finding that old stereotypes of Gentileschi as sexually immoral have been replaced by new stereotypes established in feminist readings of Gentileschi's paintings:

Without denying that sex and gender can offer valid interpretive strategies for the investigation of Artemisia's art, we may wonder whether the application of gendered readings has created too narrow an expectation. Underpinning Garrard's monograph, and reiterated in a limited way by Bissell in his catalogue raisonné, are certain presumptions: that Artemisia's full creative power emerged only in the depiction of strong, assertive women, that she would not engage in conventional religious imagery such as the Madonna and Child or a Virgin who responds with submission to the Annunciation, and that she refused to yield her personal interpretation to suit the tastes of her presumably male clientele. This stereotype has had the doubly restricting effect of causing scholars to question the attribution of pictures that do not conform to the model, and to value less highly those that do not fit the mold.

Because Gentileschi returned again and again to violent subject matter such as Judith and Holofernes, a repressed-vengeance theory has been postulated by some art historians, but other art historians suggest that she was shrewdly taking advantage of her fame from the rape trial to cater to a niche market in sexually charged, female-dominated art for male patrons.

The most recent critics, starting from the difficult reconstruction of the entire catalogue of the Gentileschi, have tried to give a less reductive reading of the career of Gentileschi, placing it in the context of the different artistic environments in which the painter participated. A reading such as this restores Gentileschi as an artist who fought with determination—using the weapon of personality and of the artistic qualities—against the prejudices expressed against women painters; being able to introduce herself productively in the circle of the most respected painters of her time, embracing a series of pictorial genres that probably were more ample and varied than her paintings suggest.

== Feminist perspectives ==
Feminist interest in Artemisia Gentileschi dates from the 1970s when the feminist art historian Linda Nochlin published an article entitled "Why Have There Been No Great Women Artists?" in which that question was dissected and analysed. The article explores the definition of "great artists" and posited that oppressive institutions, not lack of talent, have prevented women from achieving the same level of recognition that men received in art and other fields. Nochlin said that studies on Gentileschi and other women artists were "worth the effort" in "adding to our knowledge of women's achievement and of art history generally". According to the foreword by Douglas Druick in Eve Straussman-Pflanzer's Violence & Virtue: Artemisia's Judith Slaying Holofernes, Nochlin's article prompted scholars to make more of an attempt to "integrate women artists into the history of art and culture".

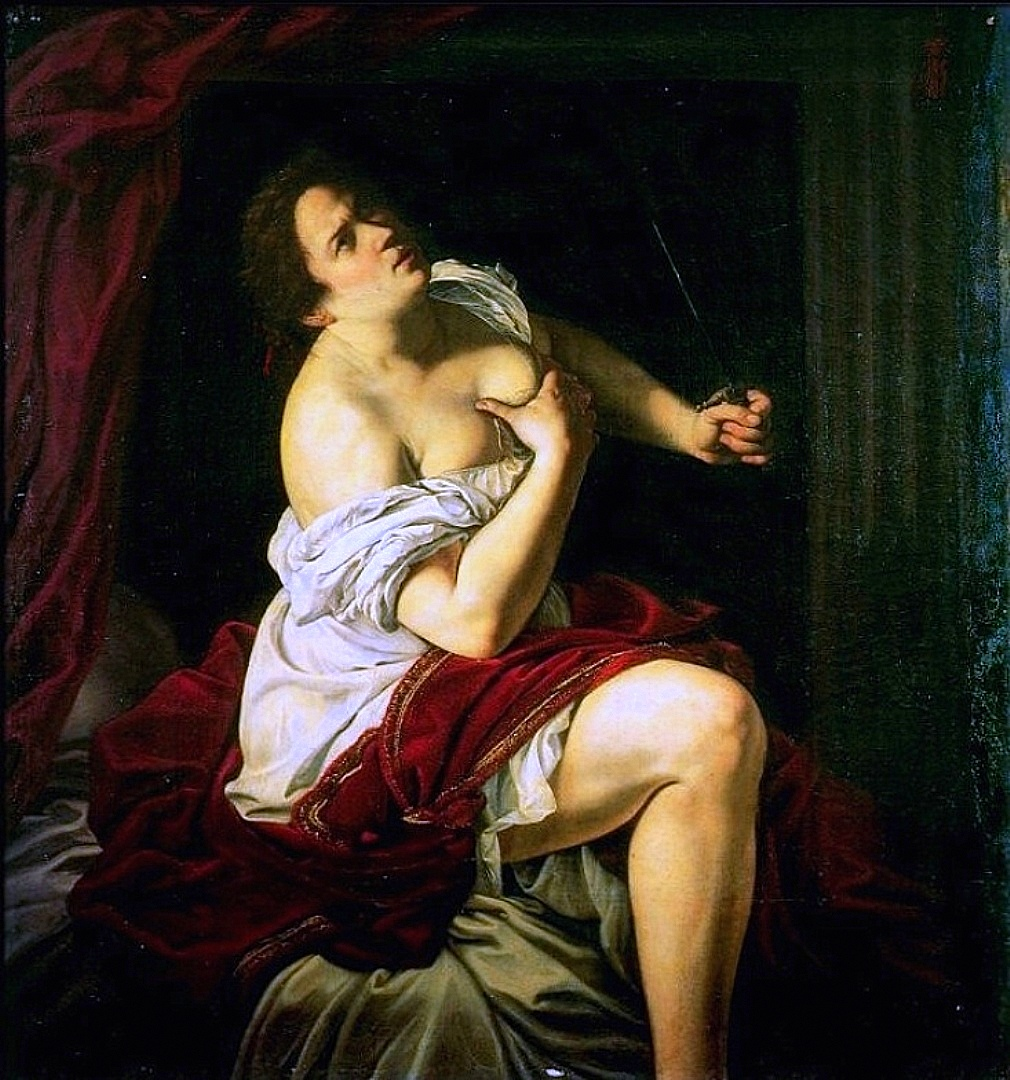
Lucretia, 1620–21

Artemisia and her oeuvre became a focus again, having had little attention in art history scholarship save Roberto Longhi's article "Gentileschi padre e figlia (Gentileschi, father and daughter)" in 1916 and Bissell's article "Artemisia Gentileschi—A New Documented Chronology" in 1968. As Gentileschi and her work began to garner new attention among art historians and feminists, more literature about her, fictional and biographical, was published. A fictional account of her life by Anna Banti, wife of critic Roberto Longhi, was published in 1947. This account was well received by literary critics, but was criticized by feminists, notably Laura Benedetti, for being lenient in historical accuracy in order to draw parallels between author and artist. The first full, factual account of Gentileschi's life, The Image of the Female Hero in Italian Baroque Art, was published in 1989 by Mary Garrard, a feminist art historian. She then published a second, smaller book entitled Artemisia Gentileschi around 1622: The Shaping and Reshaping of an Artistic Identity in 2001 that explored the artist's work and identity. Garrard noted that analysis of Gentileschi's oeuvre lacks focus and stable categorization outside of "woman", although Garrard questions whether femaleness is a legitimate category by which to judge her art at all.

Gentileschi is known for her portrayals of subjects from the Power of Women group, for example her versions of Judith Slaying Holofernes. She is also known for the rape trial in which she was involved, which scholar Griselda Pollock has argued had unfortunately become the repeated "axis of interpretation of the artist's work". Gentileschi's status in popular culture is deemed by Pollock to be due less to her work than to the sensationalism caused by the persistent focus on the rape trial during which she was tortured. Pollock offers a counter reading of the artist's dramatic narrative paintings, refusing to see the Judith and Holofernes images as responses to rape and the trial. Instead, Pollock points out that the subject of Judith and Holofernes is not a revenge theme, but a story of political courage and indeed, collaboration by two women committing a daring political murder in a war situation. Pollock seeks to shift attention from sensationalism toward deeper analysis of Gentileschi's paintings, notably of death and loss, suggesting the significance of her childhood bereavement as a source of her singular images of the dying Cleopatra. Pollock also argues that Gentileschi's success in the 17th century depended on her producing paintings for patrons, often portraying subjects they selected that reflected contemporary tastes and fashions. She aims to place Gentileschi's career in its historical context of taste for dramatic narratives of heroines from the Bible or classical sources.

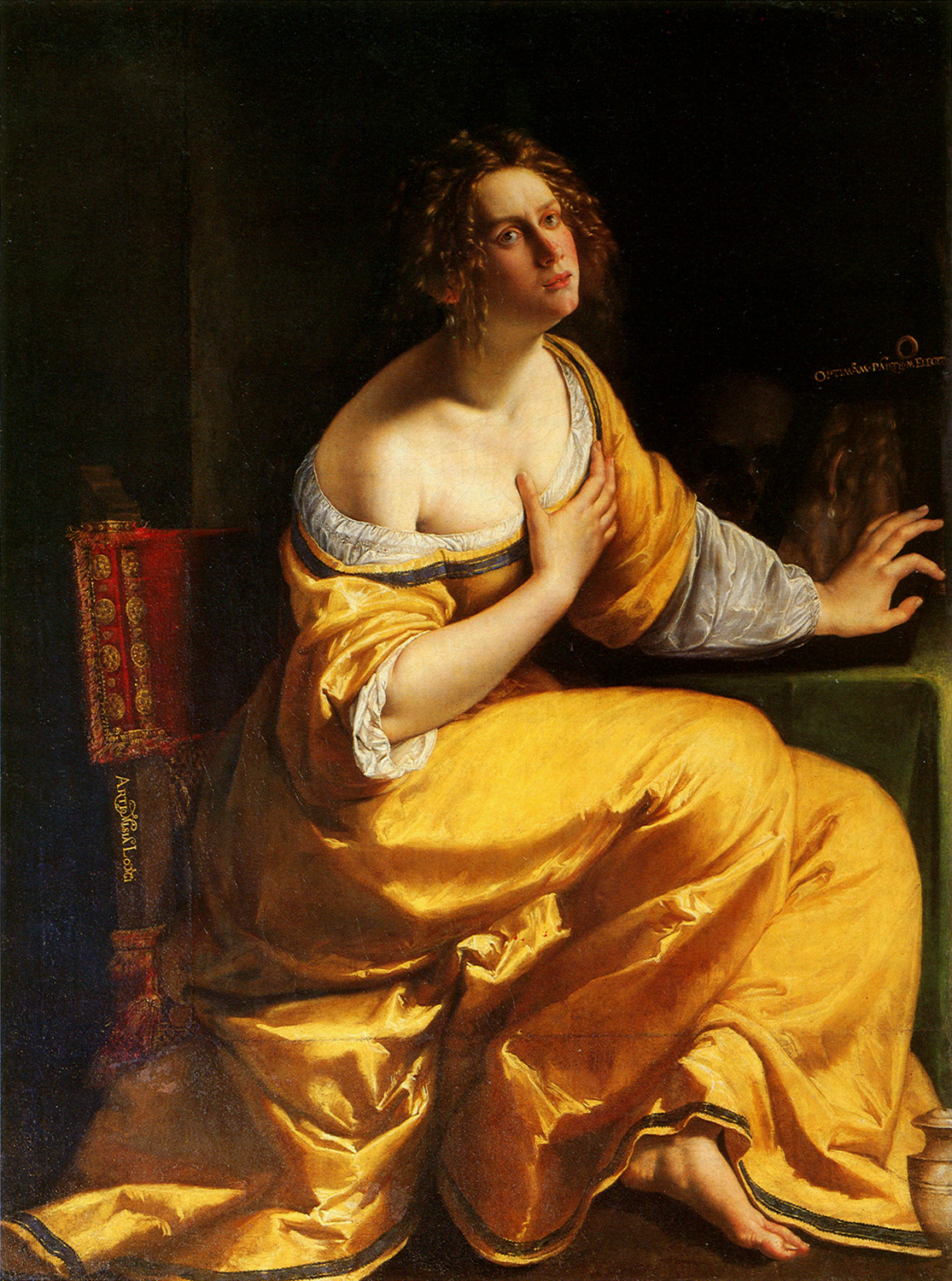
Mary Magdalene, c. 1620

In another vein entirely, American professor Camille Paglia has argued that modern feminist preoccupation with Gentileschi is misguided and that her accomplishments have been overstated: "Artemisia Gentileschi was simply a polished, competent painter in a Baroque style created by men." Nonetheless, according to The National Gallery, Gentileschi worked "in Rome, Florence, Venice, Naples, and London, for the highest echelons of European society, including the Grand Duke of Tuscany and Philip IV of Spain".

Feminist literature tends to revolve around the event of Gentileschi's rape, largely portraying her as a traumatized, but noble survivor whose work became characterized by sex and violence as a result of her experience. Pollock (2006) interpreted the film by Agnès Merlet as a typical example of the inability of popular culture to look at the painter's remarkable career over many decades and in many major centres of art, rather than this one episode. A literature review by Laura Benedetti, "Reconstructing Artemisia: Twentieth Century Images of a Woman Artist", concluded that Gentileschi's work is often interpreted according to the contemporary issues and personal biases of the authors. Feminist scholars, for example, have elevated Gentileschi to the status of feminist icon, which Benedetti attributed to Gentileschi's paintings of formidable women and her success as an artist in a male-dominated field while also being a single mother. Elena Ciletti, author of Gran Macchina a Bellezza, wrote that "The stakes are very high in Artemisia's case, especially for feminists, because we have invested in her so much of our quest for justice for women, historically and currently, intellectually and politically."

Feminist scholars suggest that Gentileschi wanted to take a stand against the stereotype of female submissiveness. One example of this symbolism appears in her Corisca and the Satyr, created between 1630 and 1635. In the painting, a nymph runs away from a satyr. The satyr attempts to grab the nymph by her hair, but the hair is a wig. Here, Gentileschi depicts the nymph to be quite clever and to be actively resisting the aggressive attack of the satyr.

== Other female painters of her time ==
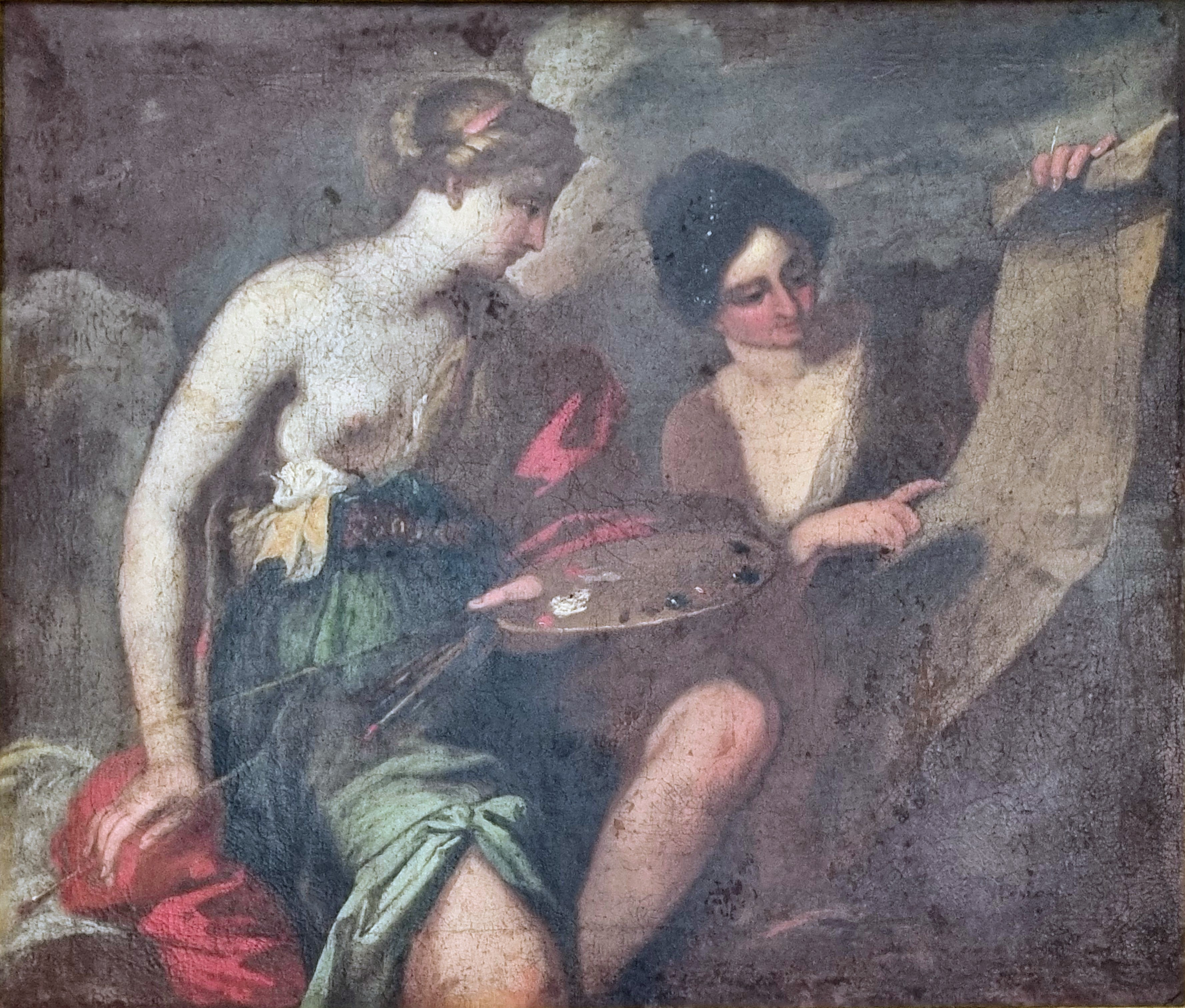
Painters Artemisia Gentileschi and Virginia Vezzi, by Simon Vouet, Virginia's husband and Gentileschi's acquaintance

For a woman at the beginning of the 17th century, Gentileschi being a painter represented an uncommon and difficult choice, but not an exceptional one. Gentileschi was aware of "her position as a female artist and the current representations of women's relationship to art". This is evident in her allegorical self portrait, Self Portrait as "La Pittura", which shows Gentileschi as a muse, "symbolic embodiment of the art" and as a professional artist.

Before Gentileschi, between the end of the 1500s and the beginning of 1600s, other women painters had successful careers, including Sofonisba Anguissola (born in Cremona around 1530). Later Fede Galizia (born in Milan or Trento in 1578) painted still lifes, and a Judith with the Head of Holofernes.

Italian Baroque painter Elisabetta Sirani was another female artist from this same period. Sirani's painting Self Portrait as Allegory of Painting (1658) shares a common colour scheme with Gentileschi's work, in her Classical Bolognese style. Elisabetta gained considerable success before her death aged 27.

== In popular culture ==
=== In novels and fiction ===
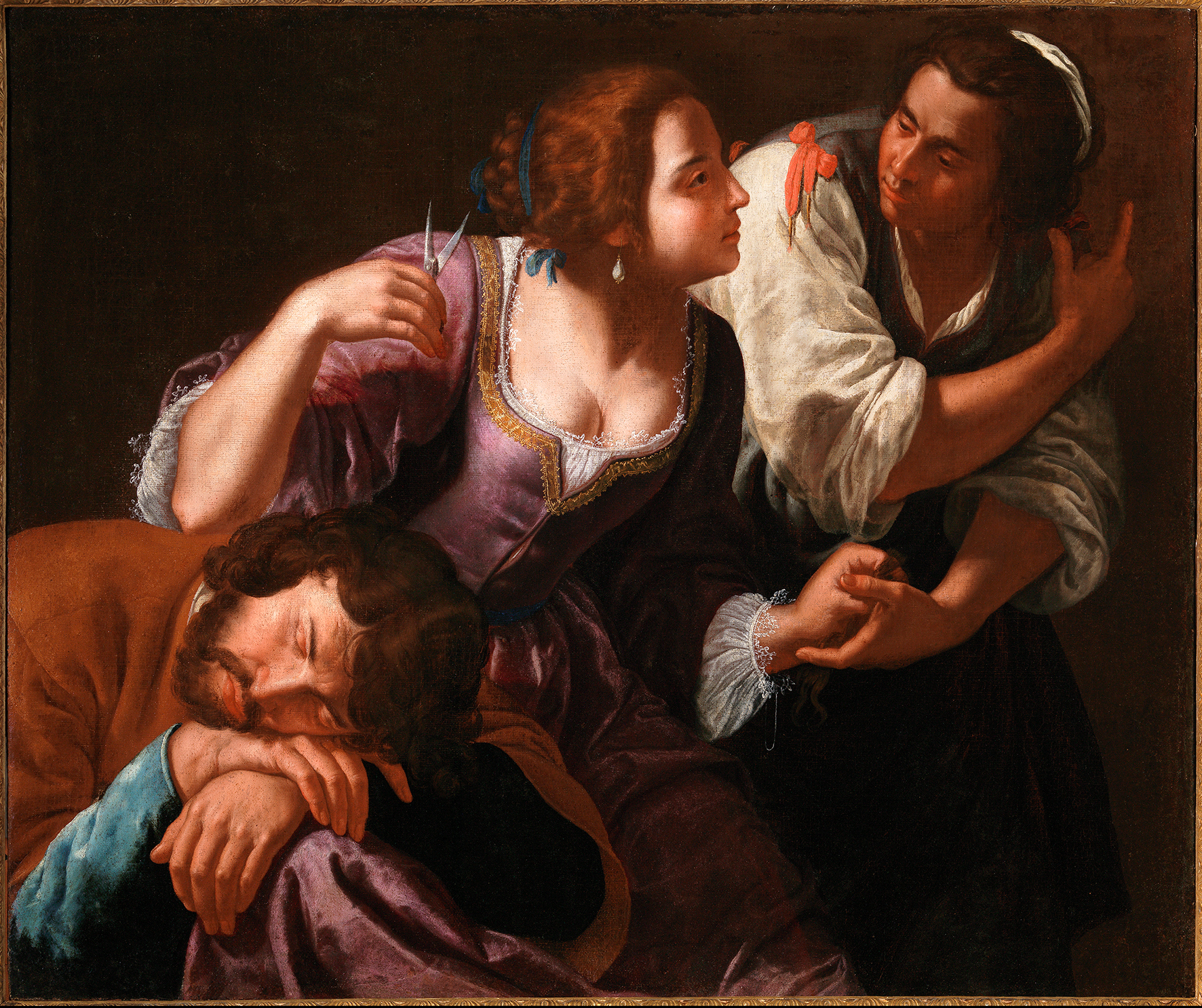
Samson and Delilah, c. 1630–1638

- The first writer who produced a novel around the figure of Gentileschi may have been George Eliot in Romola (1862–63), where some aspects of Gentileschi's story, while set in the Florence in her time, are recognisable, but much embroidered.
- A later and clearer use of Gentileschi's story appears in Anna Banti's Artemisia (1947). Banti's book is written in an "open diary" format, in which she maintains a dialogue with Gentileschi.
- Susan Vreeland published The Passion of Artemisia (2002), a biographical novel based on her life.
- She appears in Eric Flint's Ring of Fire alternate history series, being mentioned in 1634: The Galileo Affair (2004) and figuring prominently in 1635: The Dreeson Incident (2008), as well as appearing in a number of shorter stories in the 1632 universe.
- The novel Maestra (2016) by L.S. Hilton includes Gentileschi as a central reference for the main character, and several of her paintings are discussed.
- The novel Salem's Cipher (2016) by Jess Lourey used Gentileschi's painting Judith Beheading Holofernes to send a clue.
- The novel Blood Water Paint by Joy McCullough tells Gentileschi's story in poetic form.
- The manga Arte, set in 16th-century Florence, is loosely based on Gentileschi.
- The graphic biography, I Know What I Am: The Life and Times of Artemisia Gentileschi (2019), created by Gina Siciliano using ballpoint pens.
- A fictional painting by Gentileschi, The Lute Player, is a central element in Daniel Silva's 2021 espionage novel The Cellist.
- A Portrait in Shadow (Titan Books, 2023) by Nicole Jarvis is a novel about Gentileschi's career and revenge.
- Disobedient (2023) by novelist Elizabeth Fremantle is a feminist retelling of Gentileschi's life and art.

=== In the theatre ===
- Gentileschi, and more specifically her painting Judith Beheading Holofernes, are referred to in Wendy Wasserstein's play The Heidi Chronicles (1988), in which the main character, Heidi, lectures about it as part of her art history course on female painters. At the end of the play, Heidi adopts a daughter she names Judy, which is at least a partial reference to the painting.
- Canadian playwright Sally Clark wrote several stage plays based on the events leading up to and following the rape of Gentileschi. Life Without Instruction, commissioned by Nightwood Theatre in 1988, premiered at Theatre Plus Toronto on 2 August 1991.
- Blood Water Paint, a play by Joy McCullough, is a play about Artemisia Gentileschi. Productions of the play took place in Seattle in 2015 and 2019.
- Breach Theatre's It's True, It's True, It's True (2018) is a play derived from the transcripts of the trial, translated from Latin and Italian into conversational English, and was first performed at the Edinburgh Fringe Festival, where it won The Stage Edinburgh award and a Fringe First award. After touring the UK, it was then broadcast on BBC Four on 9 February 2020.
- The Anthropologists, a theater company in New York City, created a solo show, Artemisia's Intent, inspired by the life of Artemisia Gentileschi.
- The speculative nonfiction opera entitled Artemisia, with music by Laura Schwendinger and libretto by Ginger Strand, winner of American Academy of Arts and Letters Ives Opera Award ($50,000), the largest such award for opera. Artemisia was premiered in New York City by Trinity Wall Street in an orchestral version at St. Paul's Chapel with Christopher Alden, director and Lidiya Yankovskaya, conductor on 7 and 9 March 2019 as part of the Times Arrow Festival; and in San Francisco by the Left Coast Chamber Ensemble, 1 and 2 June 2019.
- Forward Theater in Madison, Wisconsin, along with World Premiere Wisconsin, commissioned and premiered Artemisia, written by Lauren Gunderson (13–30 April 2023).
- The Light and The Dark (the life and times of Artemisia Gentileschi), a play by Kate Hamill, premiered at Chautauqua Theater Company in August 2024, directed by Jade King Carroll. It is scheduled to be performed in Manhattan at Primary Stages at 59E59 Theaters in November 2024.

=== On television ===
- Gentileschi's life and the Judith Slaying Holofernes painting played a pivotal role in the ITV miniseries Painted Lady (1997), starring Helen Mirren.
- An episode of the British television crime series Endeavour (2018) depicts a series of murders inspired by Gentileschi's biblical paintings of women taking vengeance on the men who harmed or abused them.
- Gentileschi was the subject of a 2015 BBC documentary, Michael Palin's Quest for Artemisia.
- An unnamed painting by Artemisia Gentileschi is mentioned in The Crown (season 3, episode 1). Prince Philip, seeing the painting, asks Sir Anthony Blunt who the artist is, Blunt replies 'Artemisia Gentileschi', to which Philip says 'Never heard of him'. 'Her, sir', Blunt corrects him.
- Artemisia Gentileschi's life, her rape, and her Judith Slaying Holofernes painting are referenced in Episodes 3 & 4 (A Murderous Party) of the French detective series L'art du crime, starring Nicolas Gob. Blandine Bury stars as Artemisia Gentileschi.

=== In other artworks ===
- Artemisia Gentileschi is one of the women represented in The Dinner Party, an installation artwork by Judy Chicago that was first exhibited in 1979.

=== In cinema ===
- The film Artemisia (1997), by Agnès Merlet, tells the story of Gentileschi's entry into being a professional artist, her relationship with Tassi, and the trial. Merlet exonerates Tassi of rape, however, not only by depicting their sex as loving and consensual (which was controversial when the film was released), but also by two ahistorical fabrications: Gentileschi refuses under torture to say that she was raped, while Tassi falsely confesses to rape to stop Gentileschi's torment.
- In 2020 the documentary film Artemisia Gentileschi, Warrior Painter, directed by Jordan River, was produced.
- In 2026 the Animation film Slaying the Holofernes, directed by Kurumi Hakamada, was produced.

=== Tributes ===
In 1973, the Artemisia Gallery was founded and named after her; it was one of the Midwest's first feminist Cooperative Galleries located in Chicago, Illinois. It closed in 2003.

In 2019, Sloane Bouchever founded the Artemisia Foundation (AF) in Bisbee, Arizona.

In July 2025, the Paris City Hall named a square after her: Place Artemisia-Gentileschi.

== Gallery ==
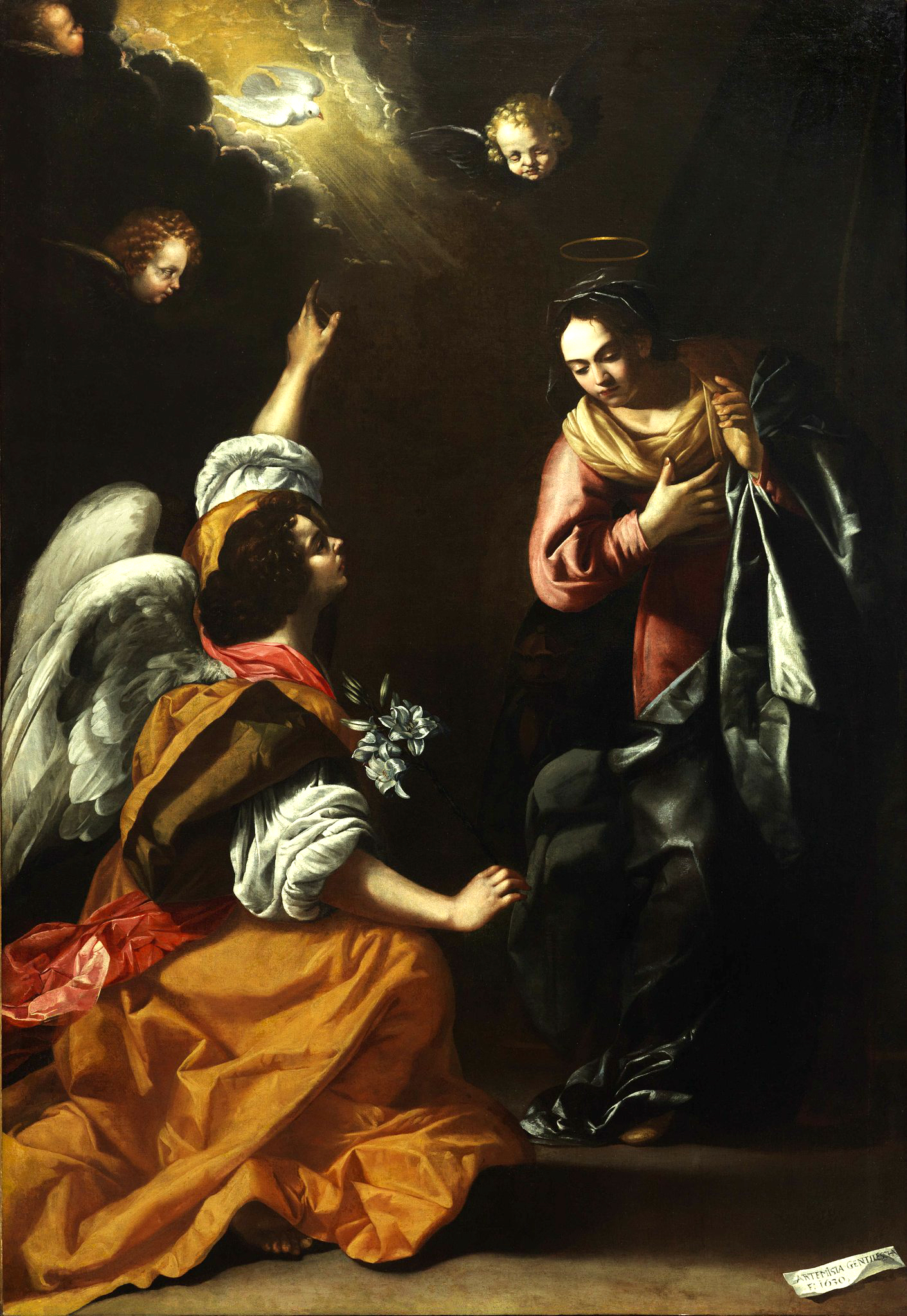
Annunciation, 1630, Museo di Capodimonte

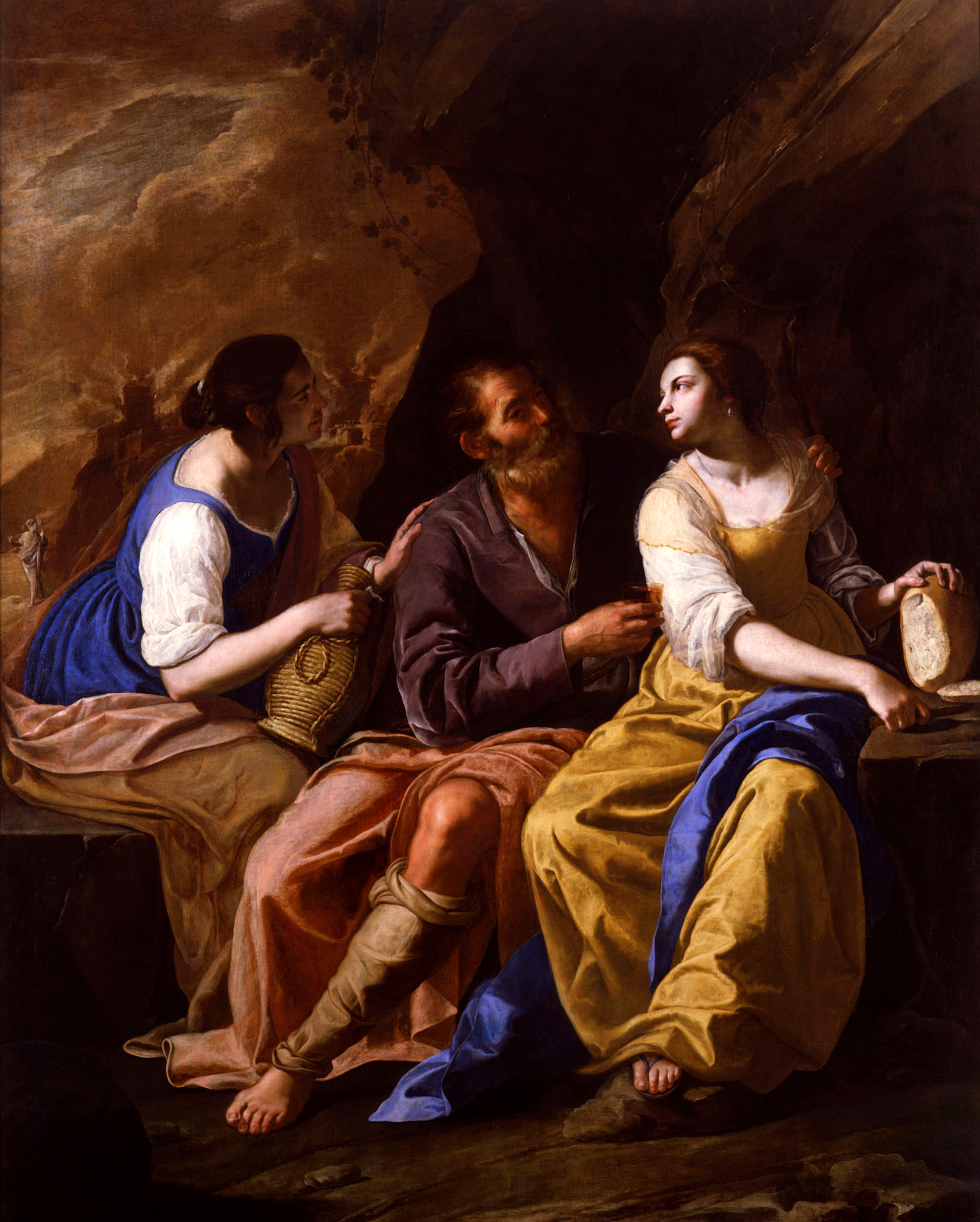
Lot and His Daughters, 1635–1638, Toledo Museum of Art

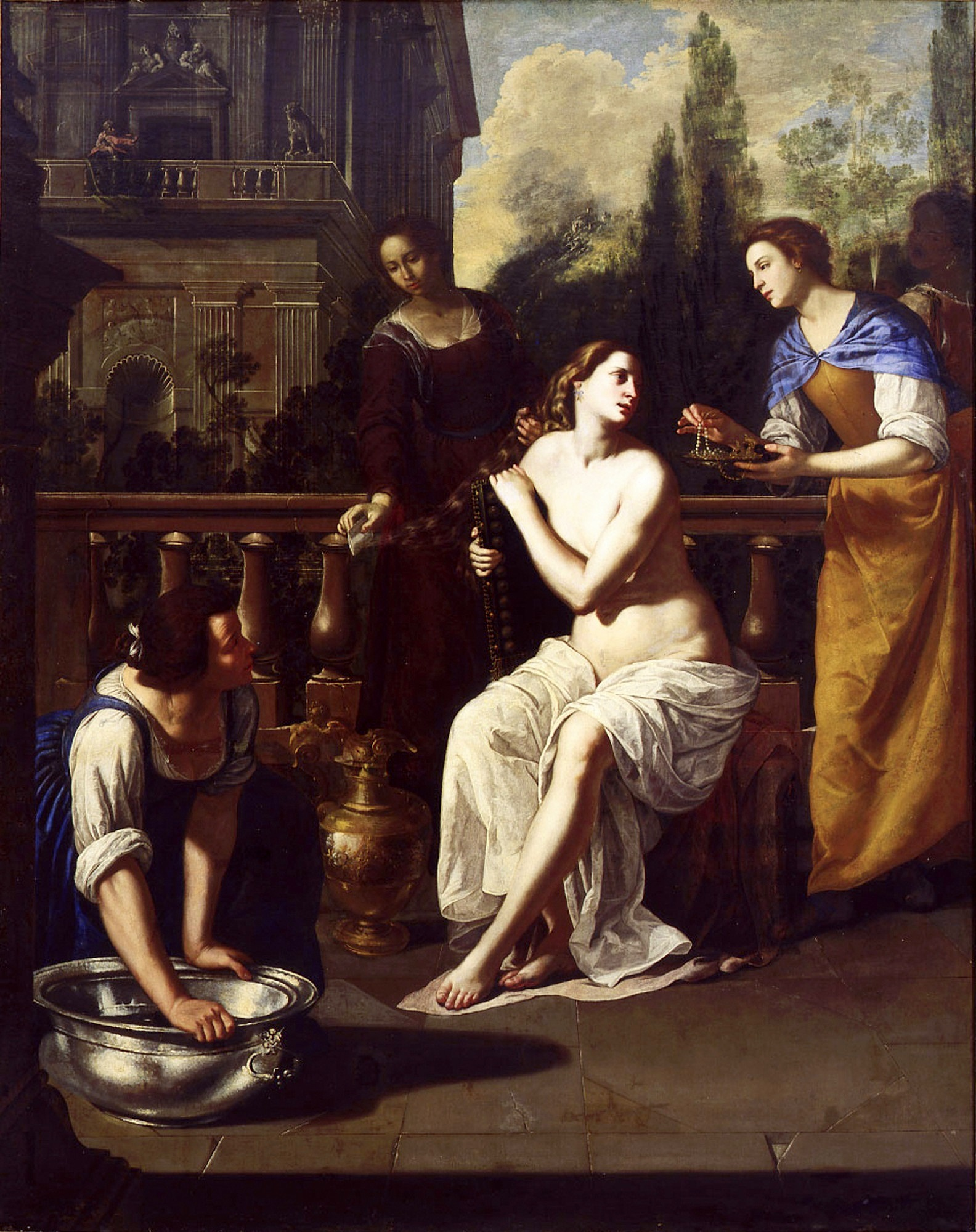
David and Bathsheba, c. 1636–1637, Columbus Museum of Art

== See also ==
- Women artists of the Baroque Era
