= Corisca and the Satyr =

Painting by Artemisia Gentileschi

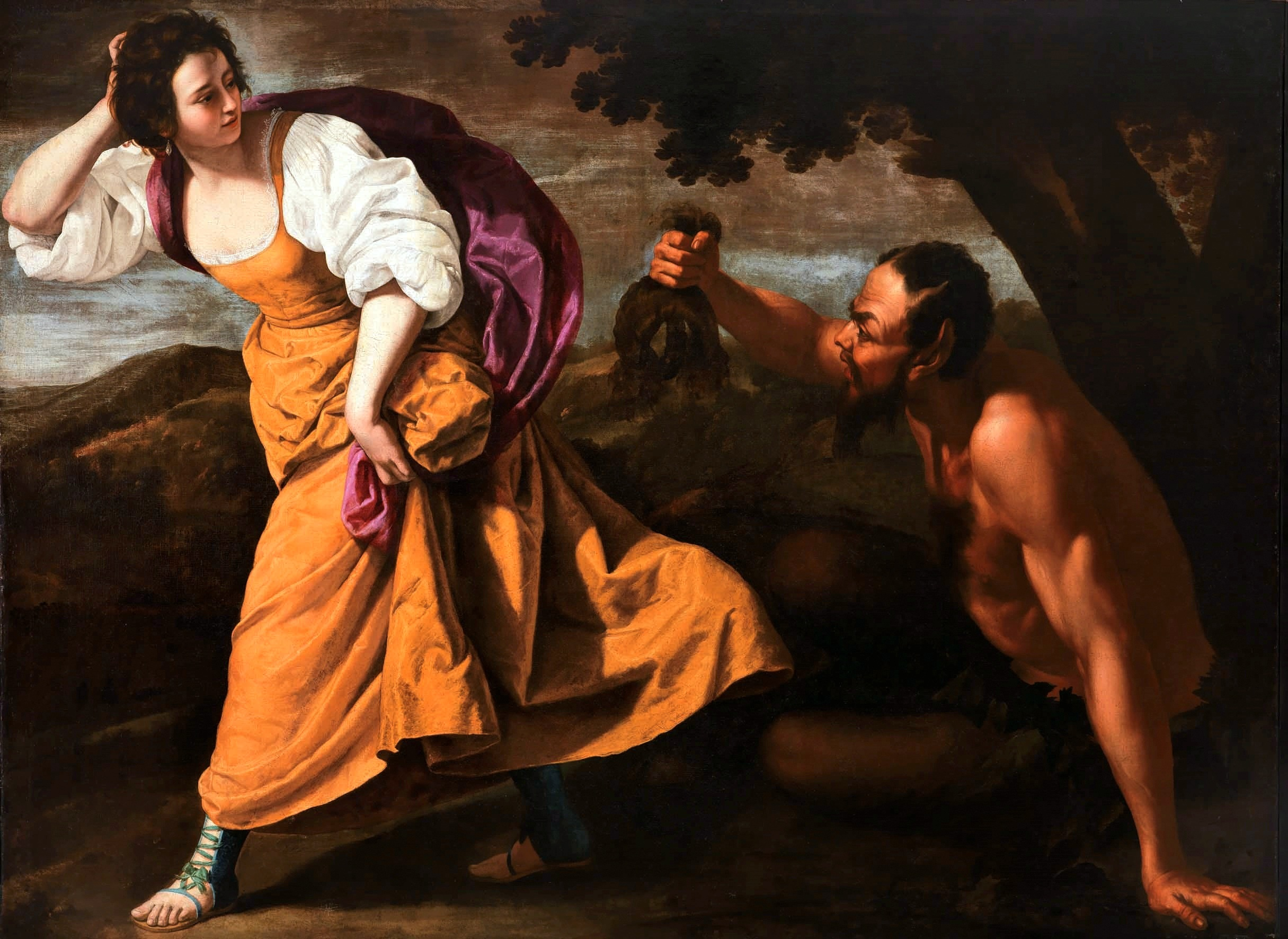
- Artist: Artemisia Gentileschi
- Year: c. 1635-7
- Medium: Oil on canvas
- Dimensions: 155 cm × 210 cm (61 in × 83 in)
- Location: private collection, Italy

Corisca and the Satyr was painted in the 1630s by the Italian artist Artemisia Gentileschi. It currently hangs in a private collection.

== Description ==
=== Subject matter ===
The story is drawn from the play Il Pastor Fido, by the sixteenth-century Italian poet and writer Giovanni Battista Guarini. The sixth scene of act two sees the nymph Corisca accept gifts of clothing and sandals from a satyr. Aroused by Corisca's acceptance of his gifts, the satyr then proceeds to attempt to rape her. He grabs her by the hair, but it turns out to be a false wig, and Corisca can escape, leaving the satyr clutching the hairpiece.

=== Composition ===
Two figures, female and male, are shown in a darkened landscape. The woman is running towards the left edge of the canvas, wearing a gold-coloured gown and a purple cloak over a white chemise. Her blue sandals contrast with the vibrant colour of her dress. She clutches her hair with her right hand and her skirts with her left, glancing back at the satyr who has fallen back on the ground, holding her hairpiece in his right hand.

== Provenance ==
The painting first surfaced in a private collection in Naples in 1989. It was sold to the present owner in March 1990 at Christie's in Rome, as a work by Massimo Stanzione.

== Attribution ==
The painting underwent cleaning in the 1990s, when the signature of Gentileschi was revealed on the tree trunk behind the satyr's back. Before this, the painting was attributed to another female artist, Annella de Rosa, as well as Massimo Stanzione. There is now consensus the painting is by Artemisia Gentileschi, executed during her time in Naples.

== Interpretation ==
After the painting was rediscovered in 1989, early interpretation linked the painting's content to Gentileschi's own personal history, connecting Corisca fleeing the satyr to Gentileschi's own rape by Agostino Tassi. More recent interpretations have weakened this link: firstly by showing that contemporary commentary on the story of Corisca and the satyr showed Corisca not as a woman wronged but as a reviled character, "viewed as a manipulative, lustful foil to two other characters in Il Pastor Fido." Garrard however counters that argument by pointing out that the gesture made by Corsica's left hand represents "a sign of folly on its recipient."

== See also ==
- List of works by Artemisia Gentileschi
