= Annunciation (Artemisia Gentileschi) =

1630 painting by Artemisia Gentileschi

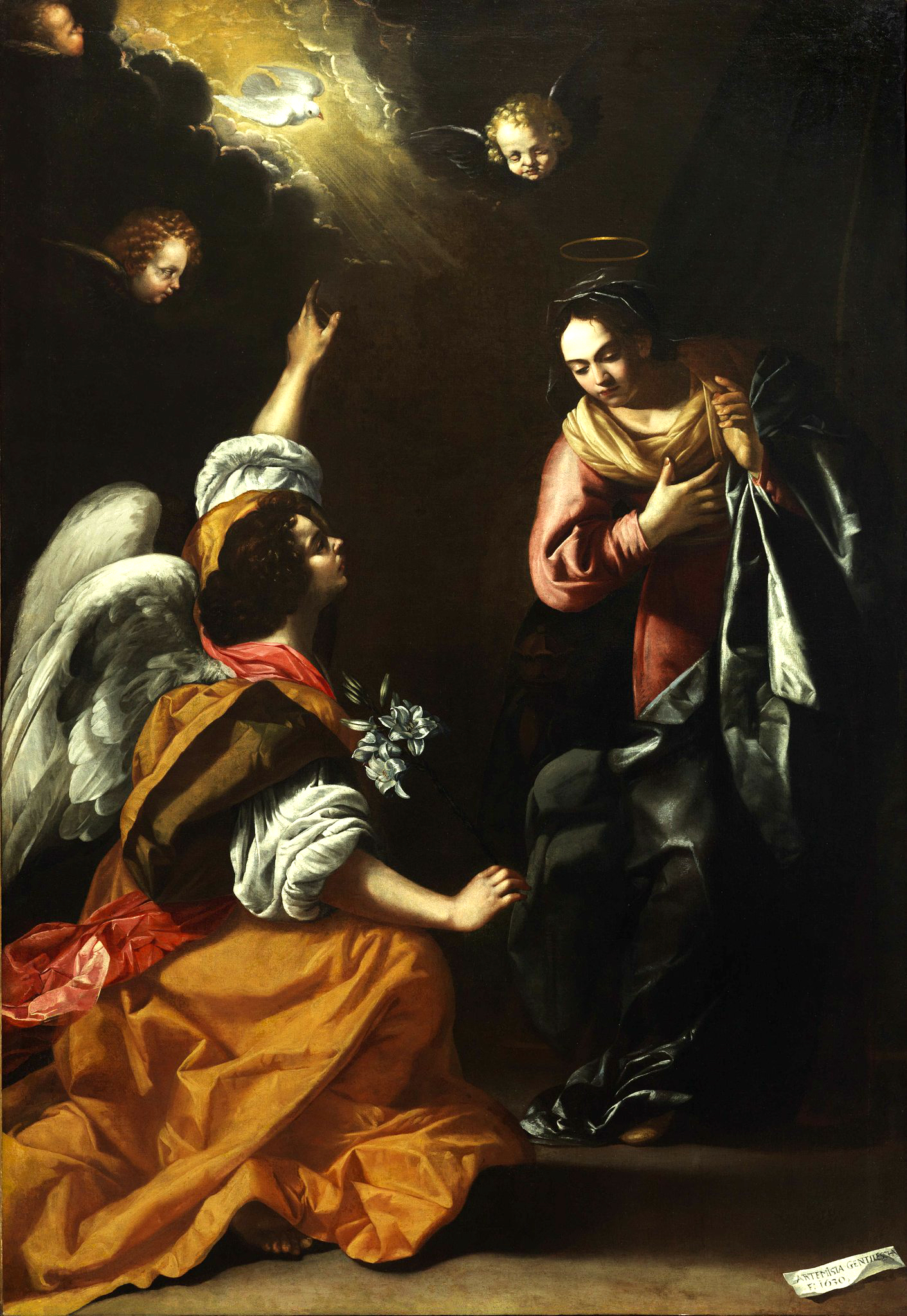
- Artist: Artemisia Gentileschi
- Year: c. 1630
- Medium: Oil on panel
- Dimensions: 257 cm × 179 cm (101 in × 70 in)
- Location: Museo di Capodimonte, Naples

Annunciation is a painting by the Italian artist Artemisia Gentileschi. It is signed and dated 1630.

== Description ==
Two brightly-illuminated figures are portrayed in a dark room. The women on the right is standing, bowing slightly with her right hand to her heart. The angelic figure on the left, clad in sumptuous saffron robes, kneels with a lily held in the right hand, while pointing upwards with the left. Light pours from a shaft above the figure, with winged cherubic heads circling. A small piece of paper on the ground to the extreme right of the painting shows the artist's signature and date. The image portrays the moment in the Gospels when the angel Gabriel announces to Mary that she is to be the mother of God.

== Provenance ==
The picture was completed early in the artist's time in Naples. It has been identified as an altarpiece, but the church for which it was commissioned has not been identified. It was first documented in the collection of Cavaliere Francesco Saverio di Rovette, who sold it to the present owners in 1815.

== Condition ==
The painting has been described as having severe abrasion and a loss of much of the half-tones and a deepening of the dark-tones, leading to exaggerated contrast.

== See also ==
- List of works by Artemisia Gentileschi
