= Jael and Sisera (Artemisia Gentileschi) =

Painting by Artemisia Gentileschi

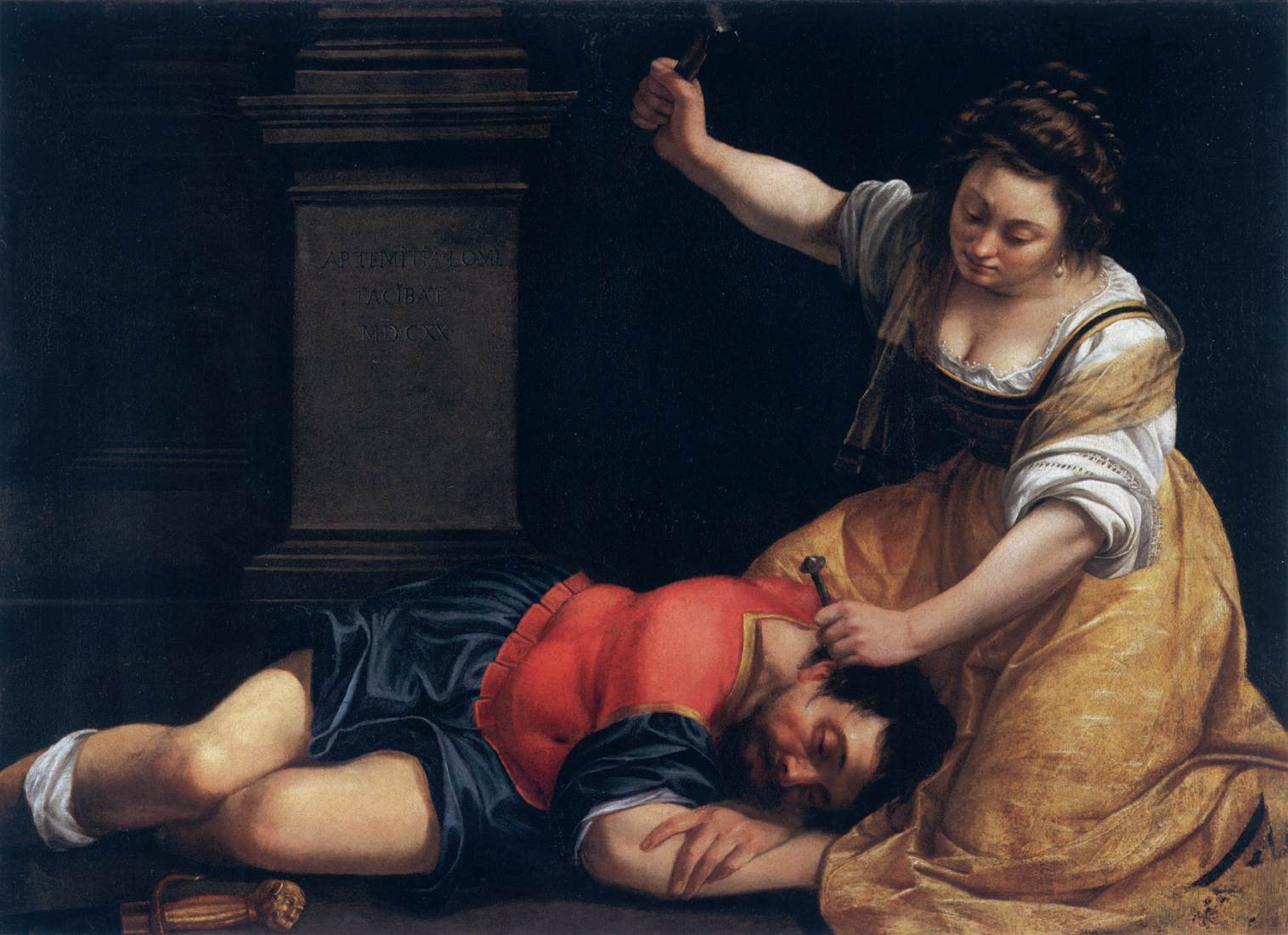
- Artist: Artemisia Gentileschi
- Year: 1620
- Medium: oil paint, canvas
- Dimensions: 93 cm (37 in) × 128 cm (50 in)
- Location: Museum of Fine Arts
- Accession: 75.11

Jael and Sisera is a painting by the Italian Baroque artist Artemisia Gentileschi, executed around 1620.

== Description ==
=== Subject matter ===
The topic of the canvas is taken from the Book of Judges, verses 4:11–22 and 5:24–31. It depicts the moment in which the Kenite woman Jael is about to kill Sisera, a defeated Canaanite general. After his defeat by the Israelites he flees to a nearby settlement, where Jael takes him in, promises to feed him and hide him from the authorities. The moment he is asleep she drives a tent peg through his temple, an act that earned Jael praise for her courage in the biblical text.

Through the Middle Ages, the story is depicted in parallel with Judith, the personified virtue Humilitas, and the Virgin Mary, amongst others. Assorted and varied images can be found in manuscripts of the 14th century Speculum Humanae Salvationis. Artistic depictions of the story are common in the Middle Ages and throughout the Modern Era.

=== Gentileschi's interpretation ===
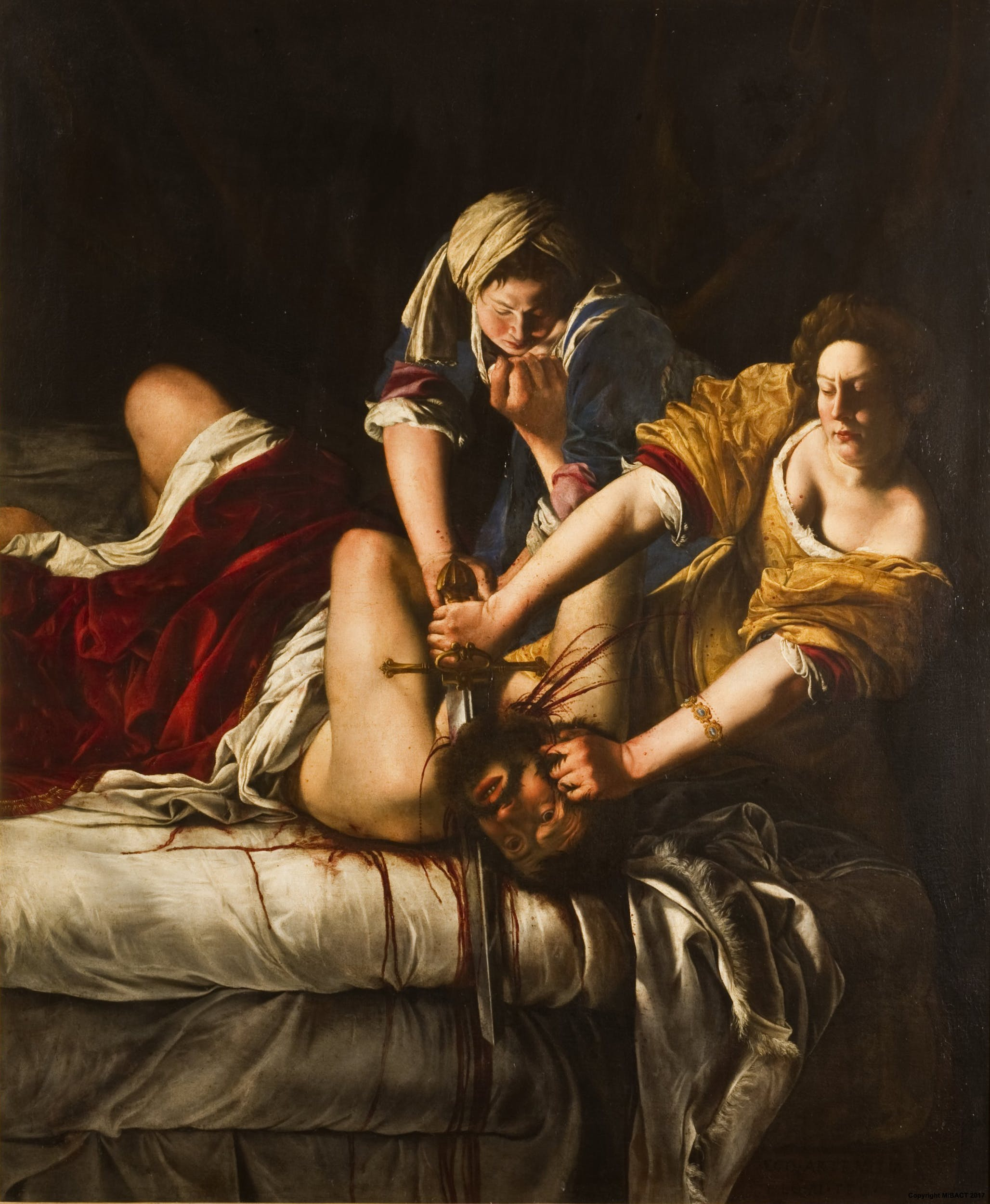
Judith slaying Holofernes by Artemisia Gentileschi, 1614–18

Gentileschi and others of her generation, produced an array of paintings of strong women in literature, including Judith's beheading of Holofernes. Agostino Tassi was both her teacher and then her convicted rapist. It is also said that he was the model for Holofernes. Sisera bears a striking resemblance to Holofernes and Tassi as well.

While the Jael story was less frequently portrayed in painting, historians believe that Artemisia's canvas was influenced by the work of Florentine artist Ludovico Cigoli. Her portrayal differs however, in the way that it develops a clear visual separation of the two figures, as opposed to Cigoli's compressed rendering. Jael's golden gown contrasts strongly with Sisera's red and blue garments; the gold is thought to signal her "virtue and imminent victory."

== History ==
The date, 1620, can be seen at the bottom of the artist's prominent signature, carved into the pillar. The awkward placement of Jael's right hand is thought to have been deliberately designed to highlight the signature. While the date places Artemisia in Rome, she signs this painting "Artemisia Lomi," suggesting a Florentine patron. While living and working in Florence, Artemisia adopted this surname, which highlighted her relationship to her uncle Aurelio, already established in the city, rather than the Roman Gentileschi, to strengthen her ties to potential patrons.

Aside from this clue the source of patronage for this painting is unknown. The prominence of the artist's signature indicate that this was a work she was proud of. The three-line signature reads, "ARTEMITA LOMI/FACIBAT/MDCXX." This is the first example of Artemisia using the imperfect tense of the Latin verb facere (to make), perhaps a reference to the way in which Michelangelo signed his Pieta.

This painting was restored in 1978 by Veronika Ember. Prior to restoration the painting had extensive paint loss in the upper left and lower right hand corners. As a result of the restoration the highlights on Sisera's skirt were strengthened; some of the (restored) shadows are more mechanical in nature than those you would expect to see by Artemisia's hand. The signature remained intact.

== Provenance ==
The work was first documented in the imperial collection in Vienna in 1781, upon its transfer to Bratislava Castle. Three years later, it was transferred to the Royal Palace in Buda, from where it may have been dispersed in 1856. The work appeared at auction in Budapest in 1974, at which point it was purchased by its current owners. The painting currently hangs in the Museum of Fine Arts, Budapest.

== See also ==
- List of works by Artemisia Gentileschi
