= Esther Before Ahasuerus (Artemisia Gentileschi) =

Painting by Artemisia Gentileschi

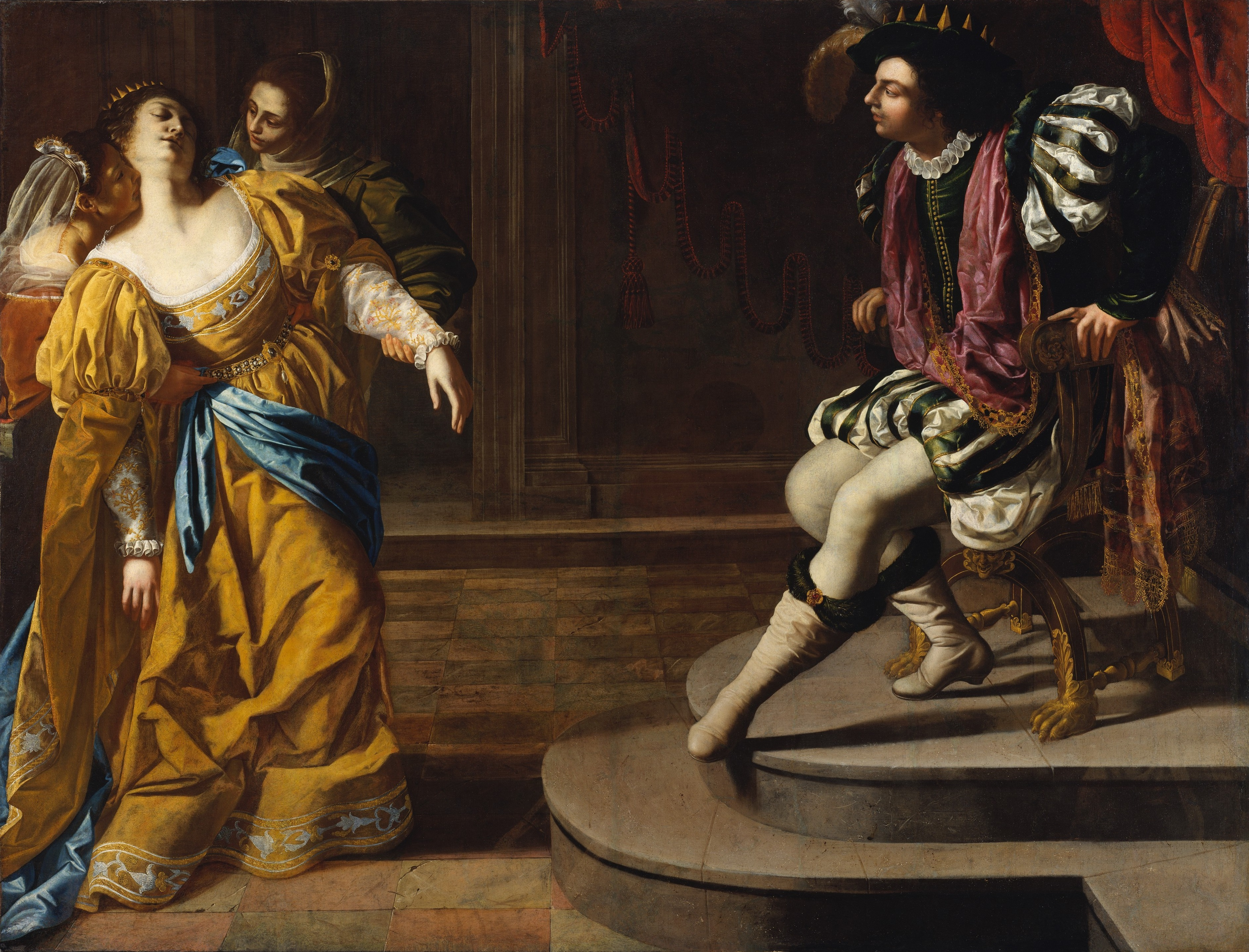
- Artist: Artemisia Gentileschi
- Year: late 1620s – 1630s
- Medium: oil paint, canvas
- Dimensions: 208.3 cm (82.0 in) × 273.7 cm (107.8 in)
- Location: Metropolitan Museum of Art

Esther Before Ahasuerus is a painting by the 17th-century Italian artist Artemisia Gentileschi. It shows the biblical heroine Esther going before Ahasuerus to beg him to spare her people. The painting is now in the Metropolitan Museum of Art in New York, having been donated to the museum by Elinor Dorrance Ingersoll in 1969. It is one of Gentileschi's lesser known works, but her use of lighting, characterization, and style help in successfully portraying Esther as a biblical heroine as well as the main protagonist of the work.

The painting is not specifically dated and the patron or the commissioner of the painting is still unknown. Scholars of Baroque art and Artemisia Gentileschi hold various opinions over when the painting was created; many believe that Esther Before Ahasuerus was painted during the 1630s, during Artemisia's first Neapolitan period.

== Background on the artist ==
Artemisia Gentileschi was one of the only women in the Baroque period who was given the training and ability to become a skilled painter, and became one of the most prominent painters of this era because of this.

Artemisia was the eldest child of artist Orazio Gentileschi and was trained in her father's workshop along with her brothers, showing more talent than any of them. She was trained in the style of Caravaggio, as her father's style took inspiration from his. Artemisia's works tend to reflect that training and as such are similar in style to Caravaggio's, but with less focus on dramatic setting and lighting seen in his works and more focus on the people involved and their characterizations. Her paintings are also less idealistic in portraying people and more naturalistic and even a bit mischievous, which can be seen in Esther Before Ahasuerus where Esther is painted to look more like a normal woman rather than an idealized one, while Ahasuerus is made to look more comedic than a king would normally be depicted.

== Subject ==
The scene in the painting is from the Book of Esther and depicts Esther, the Jewish wife of the king Ahasuerus (sometimes named as Xerxes in modern texts). After the king ordered the execution of all Jewish people in the Persian Empire, Esther went before him, without being summoned, to beg for him to spare her people. This broke court etiquette and Esther risked death in doing so. She ended up fainting before the king – the moment depicted in Gentileschi's work. Her action ended up softening the king's decision, and he permitted the Jews to defend themselves against his attack, preventing them from being killed off.

== Formal elements ==
=== Composition ===
While the subject matter depicted in this work is the biblical scene of Esther going before Ahasuerus to plead for her people, the style of the clothing and setting is more contemporary. The significance of the way Gentileschi depicts both Esther and the king speaks to her style and ideals. Esther is shown in better lighting, while Ahasuerus is in shadow, and the king is also depicted with an extravagant feathered hat and fur-trimmed boots that are also bejeweled. Esther, meanwhile, is depicted in more elegant and refined clothing. Gentileschi marks her as the protagonist of the scene in this way and gives her more agency while conveying the message of how much of a biblical heroine Esther is.

The colors in this piece are generally more muted and not very vibrant. Shades of red run throughout much of the background, darkened by brown to come off as shadows. The king Ahasuerus also has red in his outfit in the sash that he wears over his neck. Because of this, Esther's vibrantly yellow dress stands out in comparison to the rest of the painting, bringing attention to her figure. She is also better lit than the king, who is almost in shadow. His color palette is also different from the background with an outfit of white and dark green, but unlike Esther, he does not stand out as much due to the fact that he is in darker colors.

The usage of angles in this piece also speaks to how staged it is and represents the style of the Baroque era. Both Esther and the king are in almost parallel diagonal angles. Ahasuerus leans forward in his chair as Esther faints backwards, being caught by the women behind her. The diagonal angles in the curtains in front of and behind the king also give the effect of drawing the eye towards him as if to remind the viewer to pay attention to him, too, instead of just focusing on Esther. There is also a lot of direct contrast in how they are both posed. Esther is falling backwards, her chin receding into her neck, while Ahasuerus is leaning forward and looks like he is about to stand up, his chin jutting out towards her. This is a very dynamic scene with a lot of movement from both Esther and the king.

In addition, Gentileschi paid a lot of attention to the folds of the fabrics as well as in Ahasuerus's boots, and she even made the stitches on the hem of Esther's dress so exact that they almost look real. Gentileschi's attention to detail is also visible in the cracks of the marble ground as well as the fur trim on Ahasuerus's boots, and even in the detailing of the paws that adorn the king's chair. The materials in this painting feel almost real and tangible, which helps to make the scene even more relatable to viewers.

=== Comparisons ===
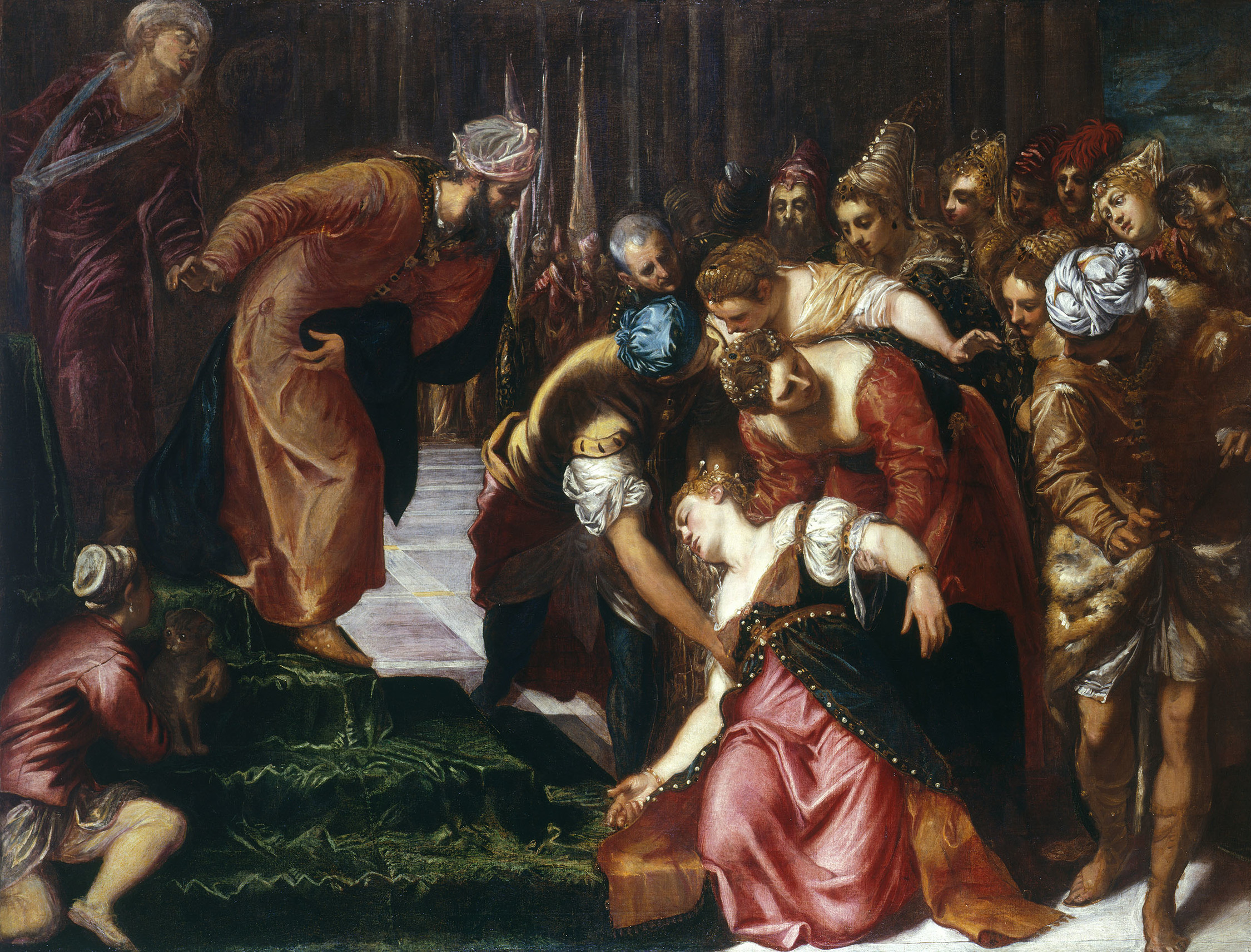
Esther Before Ahasuerus (1547–48), Tintoretto, Royal Collection

Artemisia Gentileschi's paintings are often filled with images of women committing acts of violence against men, especially in her most well known painting, Judith Slaying Holofernes. As one of the only prominent women in the Baroque era, Gentileschi's work is very well known. Her consistent motifs of women having power over men and even killing them is possibly a revenge narrative linked to the fact that Gentileschi was raped by her father's friend Agostino Tassi when she was just a teen. Her works also tend to have themes of men objectifying women, as seen in Susanna and the Elders. Esther Before Ahasuerus is an example of a work that conveys both of these themes.

=== Influences ===
Artemisia was not singular in her choice to depict the theme of Esther before Ahasuerus. Other artists of the period had also painted this passage from the book of Esther. Like Artemisia, Guercino shows Esther swooning and being held up by her maids. In the Apocryphal text, which Guercino most likely relied on for his depiction, Esther's relationship with the King is meant to represent Mary's unity with Christ. The pomegranate, which is embroidered on Esther's dress in Guercino's and Artemisia's paintings, also symbolize the Virgin. The fruit reference's Mary's attributes – chastity and immortality.

Artemisia, a Caravaggisti, was also influenced by Caravaggio's works in Rome during her family's sojourn in the city and her father's personal relationship with the artist Caravaggisti sensibilities can be seen in Esther Before Ahasuerus. The king gravitates towards Esther, the significant figure in the composition. The dynamic between the two figures suggests role-reversal; Esther holds the power of the monarchy, and Ahasuerus is the novice. The role-reversal seen in Artemisia's Esther Before Ahasuerus is reminiscent of Caravaggio's own use of gender ambiguity and gender-reversal in his work. It can be seen in Boy with a Basket of Fruit, in which Caravaggio depicted an effeminate young boy in a sensual manner. The gender of figure of the Gorgon in Caravaggio's Medusa also seems vague. It is suggested Caravaggio drew from his own face to create the image of Medusa, placing himself as the figure of the female mythological creature. Ahasuerus is characterized as a "modish dandy of a type", a depiction Caravaggio would use to represent "superficiality". In juxtaposition to the King, Esther is majestic in her swooning

Esther's muscular neck is also comparable to Michelangelo's depiction of Haman in the Sistine Chapel ceiling fresco.

=== Iconography ===
Gentileschi's rendition of this scene from the Book of Esther seems to follow the description seen in the Greek additions to the original account, which was declared canonical during the Council of Trent in 1546. One distinct difference between Gentileschi's work and the text is in how Ahasuerus is portrayed. The text states that he was "dressed in all his robes of state ... a formidable sight". In contrast, Gentileschi's depiction of the king is not very formidable, and he is leaning forward in a comedic manner with a puzzled expression on his face as Esther faints. This does not seem to be the face of a king who has the power to order the execution of an entire race, and that may be part of Gentileschi's intent as far as his portrayal goes; the people in charge may not always appear as powerful and scary as their position entails.

== New findings ==
Looking closely, one can see what looks like the shadow of a boy near the king's knee. X-rays by the Metropolitan Museum of Art revealed that this was a figure of an African boy restraining a dog that was painted over intentionally; this is thought to be a reference to Veronese's depiction of this same scene, to which Gentileschi's painting bears some similarities. In Veronese's Esther Before Ahasuerus, however, the dog is resting by the king and not trying to attack Esther.

== Provenance ==
Recent research suggests that the painting may have been started during Artemisia's time in Venice, before she moved to Naples. The work is first documented in the collection of Grafen von Harrach in Vienna from 1856. The painting was sold to Alessandro Morandotti in 1953, who later sold it to Elinor Dorrance Hill (later Mrs. Stuart H. Ingersoll) in the 1960s.

== See also ==
- List of works by Artemisia Gentileschi
