= Saint Januarius in the Amphitheatre at Pozzuoli =

Painting by Artemisia Gentileschi

The Martyrdom of St Januarius in the Amphitheatre at Pozzuoli
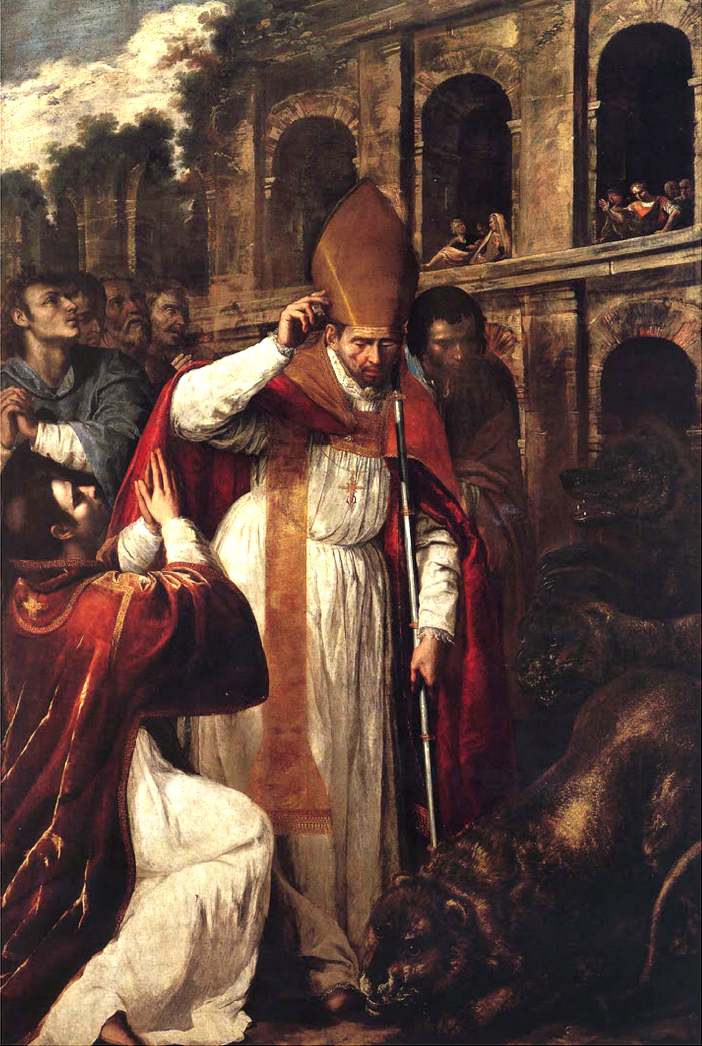
- Artist: Artemisia Gentileschi
- Year: c. 1635-7
- Medium: Oil on canvas
- Dimensions: 308 cm × 200 cm (121 in × 79 in)
- Location: Pozzuoli Cathedral, Naples

Saint Januarius in the Amphitheatre at Pozzuoli is a 1635-1637 oil on canvas painting by Artemisia Gentileschi. The work shows the moment that the Christian martyr Januarius and his followers are thrown to a group of wild animals in the amphitheatre in Pozzuoli - however, they lick the saint's feet rather than attacking him and Januarius is unharmed.

== Patronage ==
On the appointment of a new bishop in 1631, the cathedral of Pozzuoli underwent significant renovations. Gentileschi's painting was one of three she was commissioned to execute for placement above the cathedral's choir stalls. The Adoration of the Magi, and Saints Proculus and Nicea are also still in place in the cathedral. It is likely that existing contacts of Gentileschi, such as the Viceroy of Naples (Manuel de Acevedo y Zuniga), helped secure the commission for her.

== Story ==
Januarius was an early Christian from the third and fourth centuries. He was made Bishop of Naples (where he is still the patron saint) and his protection of Christians raised the ire of the Roman Emperor Diocletian. According to his hagiographers, Januarius was arrested and then survived various attempts to kill him. Gentileschi here portrays one of those attempts when the saint was thrown into the amphitheatre in Pozzuoli. Diocletian expected him to be attacked by the wild animals, but Gentileschi illustrates the moment that the lion and bear are tamed, and with great docility show their obedience to the Bishop. The figure kneeling at the bottom left is Proculus, the deacon of Pozzuoli, who like Januarius would also be martyred.

== Provenance ==
Along with Saints Proculus and Nicea and Adoration of the Magi, the painting of Januarius was commissioned from her for the choir of Pozzuoli Cathedral. The amphitheatre and figures in the background were painted by one (or more) of Gentileschi's collaborators from Rome. After fire damage in 1964 they were transferred to the Certosa di San Martino. They were later moved to the Museo di Capodimonte in nearby Naples, before returning to Pozzuoli Cathedral in 2014.

The 1964 fire damaged some of the painting; restorations have partially rectified the damage, while also revealing Gentileschi's signature beneath the tail of the lion.

== Critical reception ==
Art historians have noted that the style has less of the drama associated with her earlier paintings, naming it "a balanced and conservative composition." Others have pointed to the need to use a particular tone that would blend with the other paintings created for the renovation of the cathedral - this would have obliged Gentileschi to work in a slightly more muted style.

== See also ==
- List of works by Artemisia Gentileschi
