= Saints Proculus and Nicea (painting) =

Painting by Artemisia Gentileschi

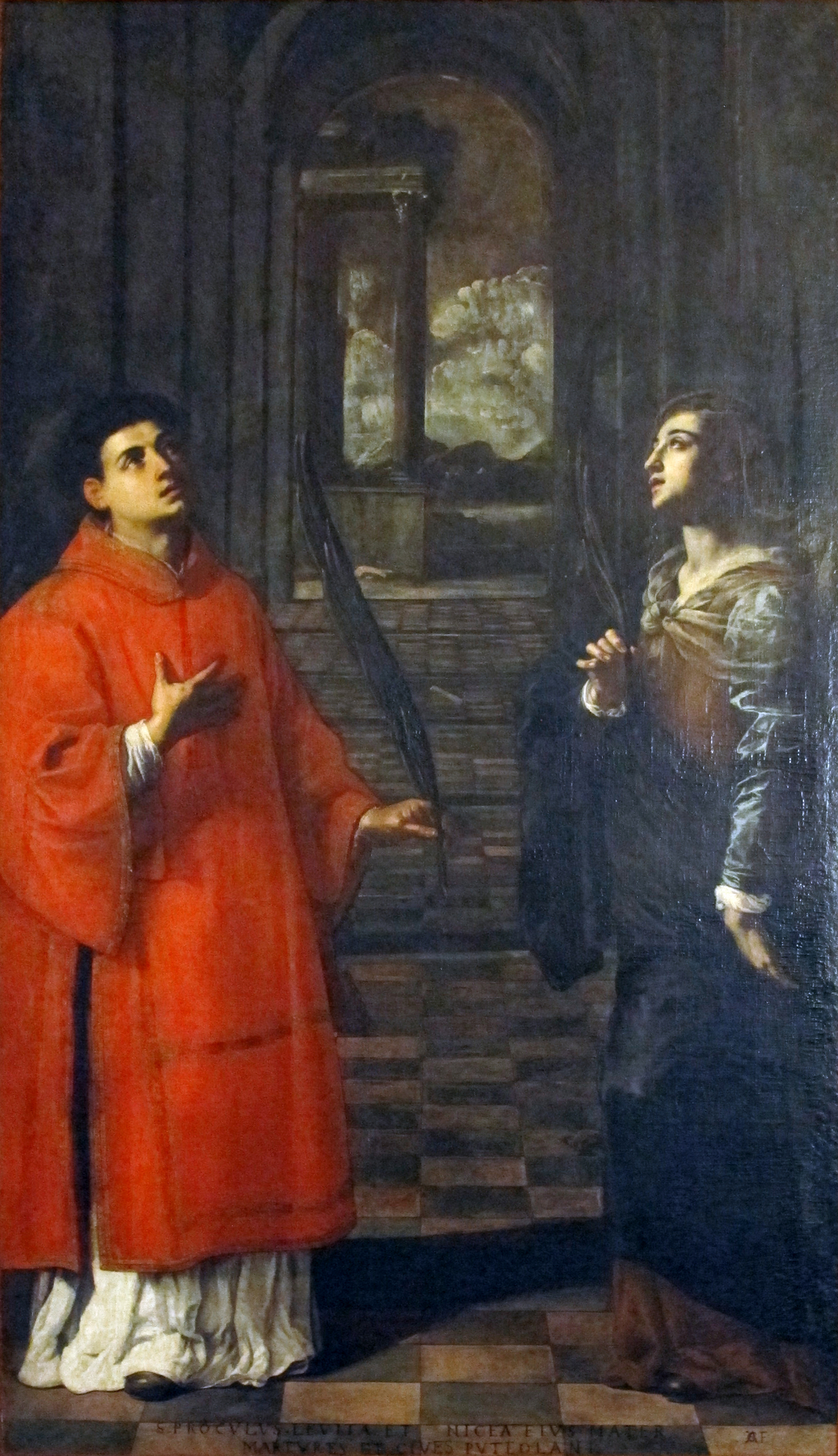
- Artist: Artemisia Gentileschi
- Year: c. 1635-1637
- Medium: oil on canvas
- Dimensions: 300 cm × 180 cm (120 in × 71 in)
- Location: Pozzuoli Cathedral, Naples

Saints Proculus and Nicea is a 1635-1637 painting by Artemisia Gentileschi of Proculus and Nicea. Along with Adoration of the Magi and Saint Januarius in the Amphitheatre at Pozzuoli, it was commissioned by Martín de León Cárdenas for the choir of Pozzuoli Cathedral, of which he was bishop. After around fifty years' restoration in Naples, the painting was returned to its original spot in May 2014 when the Cathedral reopened for worship.

== Patronage ==
On the appointment of a new bishop in 1631, the cathedral of Pozzuoli underwent significant renovations. Gentileschi's painting was one of three she was commissioned to execute for placement above the cathedral's choir stalls. Saint Januarius in the Amphitheatre at Pozzuoli, and Adoration of the Magi are also still in place in the cathedral. It is likely that existing contacts of Gentileschi, such as the Viceroy of Naples (Manuel de Acevedo y Zuniga), helped secure the commission for her.

== Subject matter ==
Proculus was Deacon of Pozzuoli when he was martyred in AD 305, along with his companion Januarius. He stands in a vaulted hall with his mother Nicea, both holding martyr's palms.

== Provenance ==
The group of paintings remained in the cathedral choir since their creation. After fire damage in 1964 they were transferred to the Certosa di San Martino. They were later moved to the Museo di Capodimonte in nearby Naples, before returning to Pozzuoli Cathedral in 2014.

== See also ==
- List of works by Artemisia Gentileschi
