= Lake Avernus =

Crater lake in Italy

- Lago d'Averno (Italian)
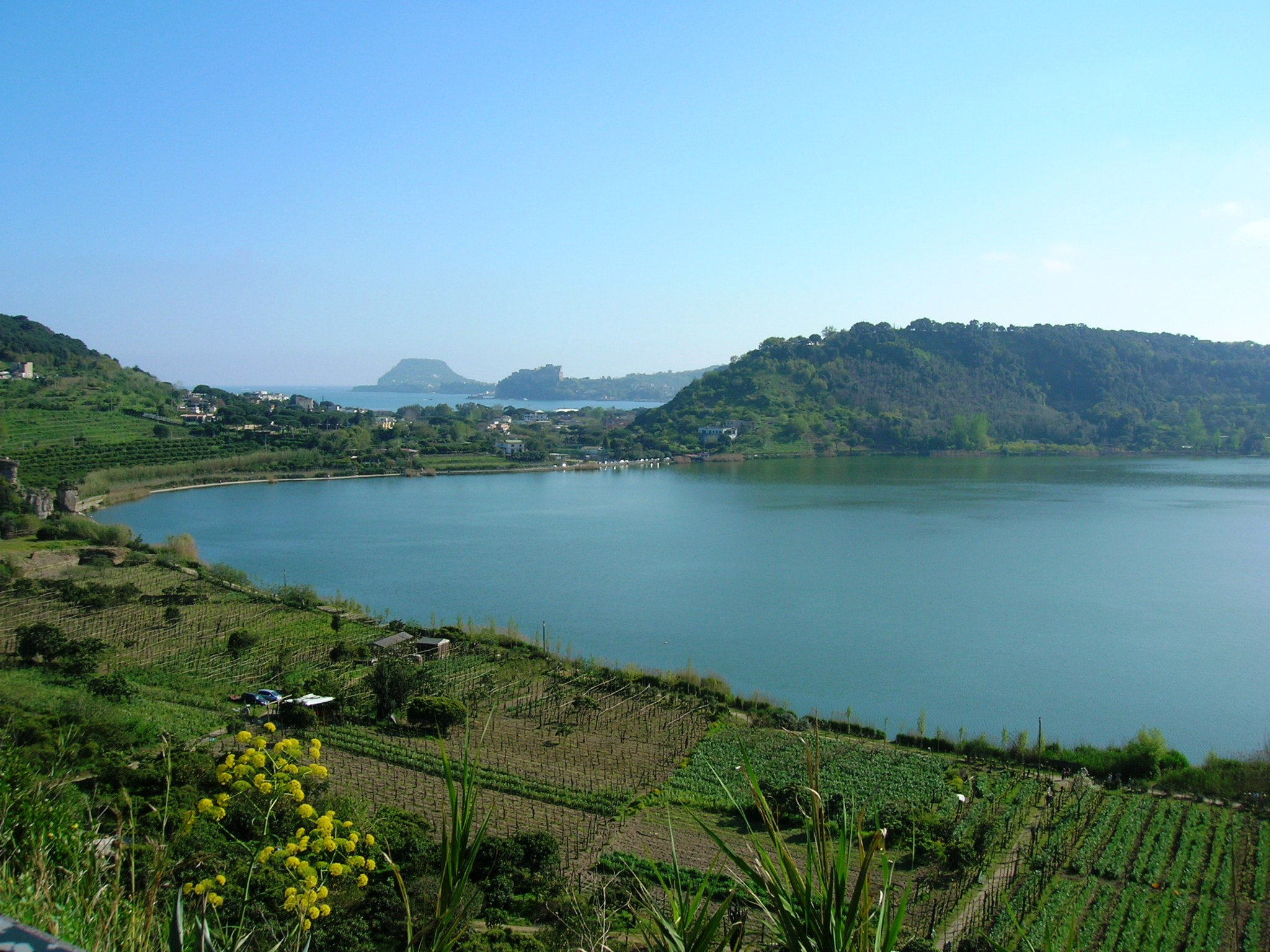

- Location within Campania Location within Italy
- Coordinates: 40°50′18″N 14°04′30″E
- Type: crater lake
- Max. depth: 60 m (200 ft)
- Surface elevation: 1 m (3 ft)

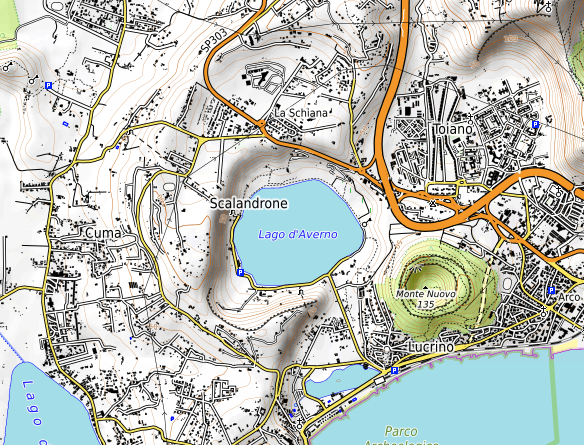
Lake Averno

Lake Avernus (Italian: Lago d'Averno) is a volcanic crater lake located in the Avernus crater in the Campania region of southern Italy, around 4 kilometres (2 1/2 miles) west of Pozzuoli. It is near the volcanic field known as the Phlegraean Fields (Campi Flegrei) and comprises part of the wider Campanian volcanic arc. The lake is roughly circular, measuring two kilometres (1 1/4 mi) in circumference and 60 metres (200 ft) deep.

== Roman era ==
Avernus was of major importance to the Romans, who considered it to be the entrance to Hades. Roman writers often used the name as a synonym for the underworld. In Virgil's Aeneid, Aeneas descends to the underworld through a cave near the lake. In Hyginus' Fabulae, Odysseus also goes to the lower world from this spot, where he meets Elpenor, his comrade who went missing at Circe's palace.

Despite the alleged dangers of the lake, the Romans were happy to settle its shores, on which villas and vineyards were established. The lake's personification, the deus Avernus, was worshipped in lakeside temples. A large bathhouse was built on the eastern shore of the lake.

In 37 BC, the Roman general Marcus Vipsanius Agrippa converted the lake into a naval base named the Portus Julius after Octavian. It was linked by a canal to a nearby lake (Lucrinus Lacus) and, from there, to the sea. The lake shore was also connected to the Greek colony of Cumae by an underground passage known as Cocceio's Cave (Grotta di Cocceio), which was one kilometre (0.6 mi) long and wide enough to be used by chariots. This was the world's first major road tunnel; it remained usable until as recently as the 1940s.

== Italian era ==
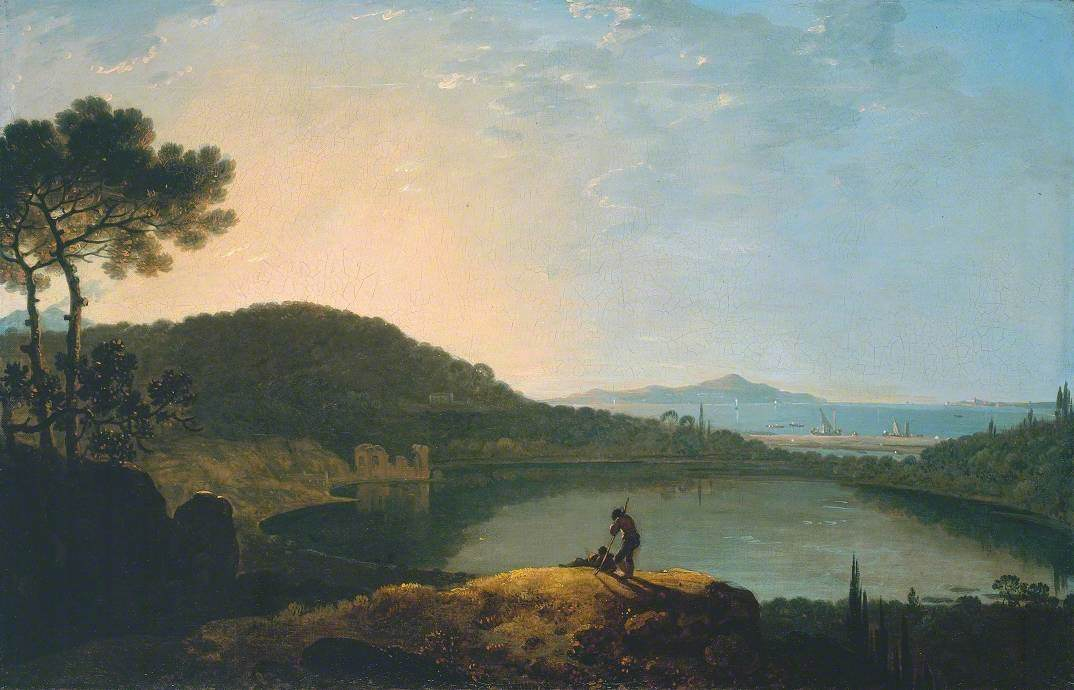
Lake Avernus and the Island of Capri by Richard Wilson, 1760

The Borboni, the Naples-ruling members of the House of Bourbon, owned the lake until 1750 when they ceded it to another aristocratic family, who in turn sold it, in 1991, to the Cardillo family. In 2010, a 55-hectare (140-acre) tract of land—including the lake, a lakefront restaurant, B&B and disco—was seized by the police after the owner was accused of being a mafia frontman (for the Casalesi).

In the pre-modern era, Italian geographers also called Lago Averno the Lago di Tripergola. It was named after the nearby village of Tripergola, which was destroyed by a volcanic eruption in 1538.
