= Adoration of the Magi (Artemisia Gentileschi) =

Painting by Artemisia Gentileschi

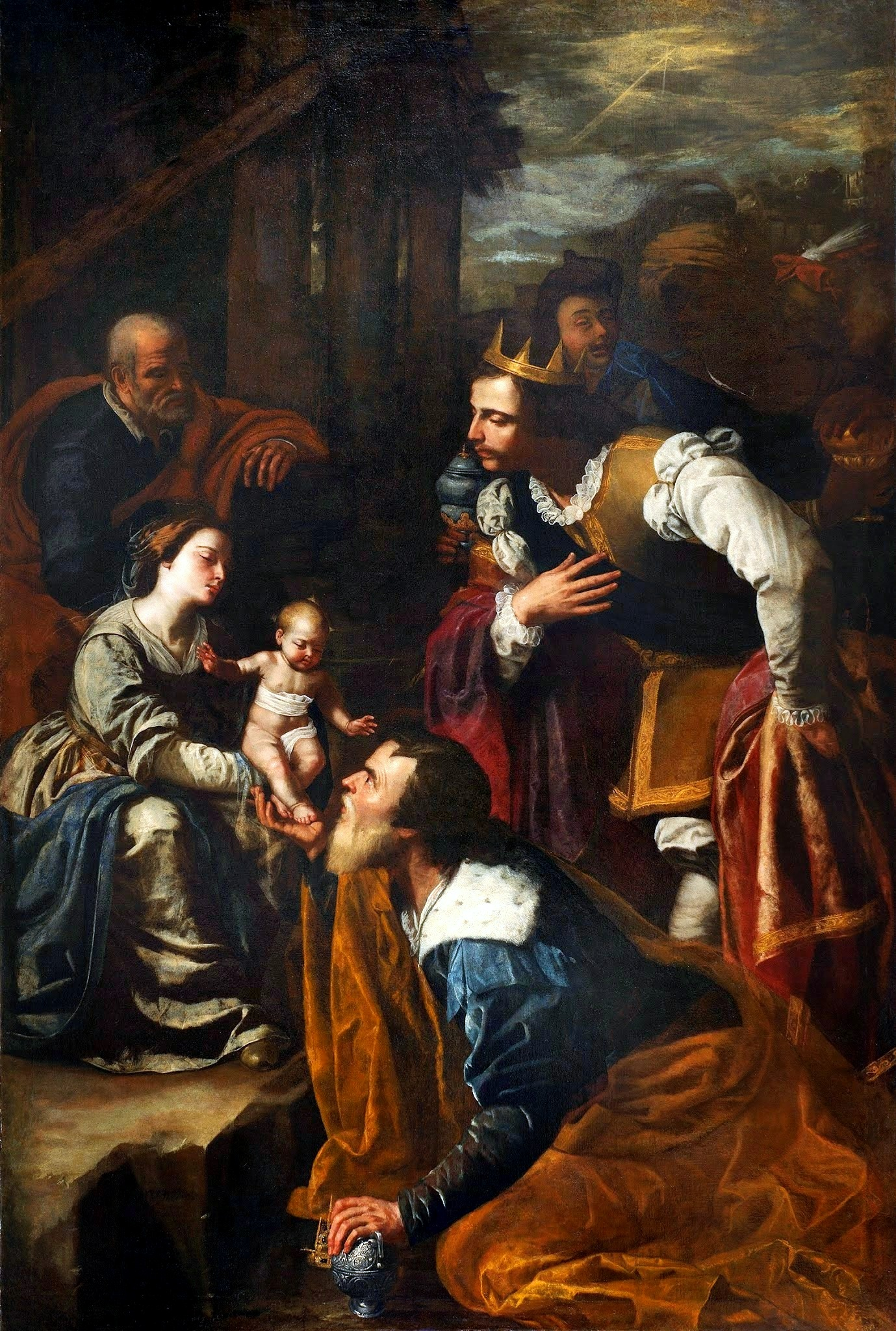
- Artist: Artemisia Gentileschi
- Year: c. 1635–1637
- Medium: oil on canvas
- Dimensions: 310 cm × 206 cm (120 in × 81 in)
- Location: Pozzuoli Cathedral, Naples

Adoration of the Magi is a 1635–1637 painting by Artemisia Gentileschi. Along with Saint Januarius in the Amphitheatre at Pozzuoli and Saints Proculus and Nicea, it was commissioned by Martín de León Cárdenas, bishop of Pozzuoli for Pozzuoli Cathedral. Adoration was held in Naples for around fifty years for conservation before being returning to its original position in the Cathedral in May 2014.

== Patronage ==
On the appointment of a new bishop in 1631, the cathedral of Pozzuoli underwent significant renovations. Gentileschi's painting was one of three she was commissioned to execute for placement above the cathedral's choir stalls. Saint Januarius in the Amphitheatre at Pozzuoli, and Saints Proculus and Nicea are also still in place in the cathedral. It is likely that existing contacts of Gentileschi, such as the Viceroy of Naples (Manuel de Acevedo y Zúñiga), helped secure the commission for her.

== Provenance ==
The group of paintings remained in the cathedral choir since their creation. After fire damage in 1964 they were transferred to the Certosa di San Martino. They were later moved to the Museo di Capodimonte in nearby Naples, before returning to Pozzuoli Cathedral in 2014.

== See also ==
- List of works by Artemisia Gentileschi

== Bibliography ==
- Angelo D'Ambrosio - Storia di Pozzuoli... in pillole. Edizione D. Conte, Pozzuoli, 1959
