= Lucrinus Lacus =

- Lucrine Lake
- Lago di Lucrino (Italian); Laco 'e Lucrine (Neapolitan)
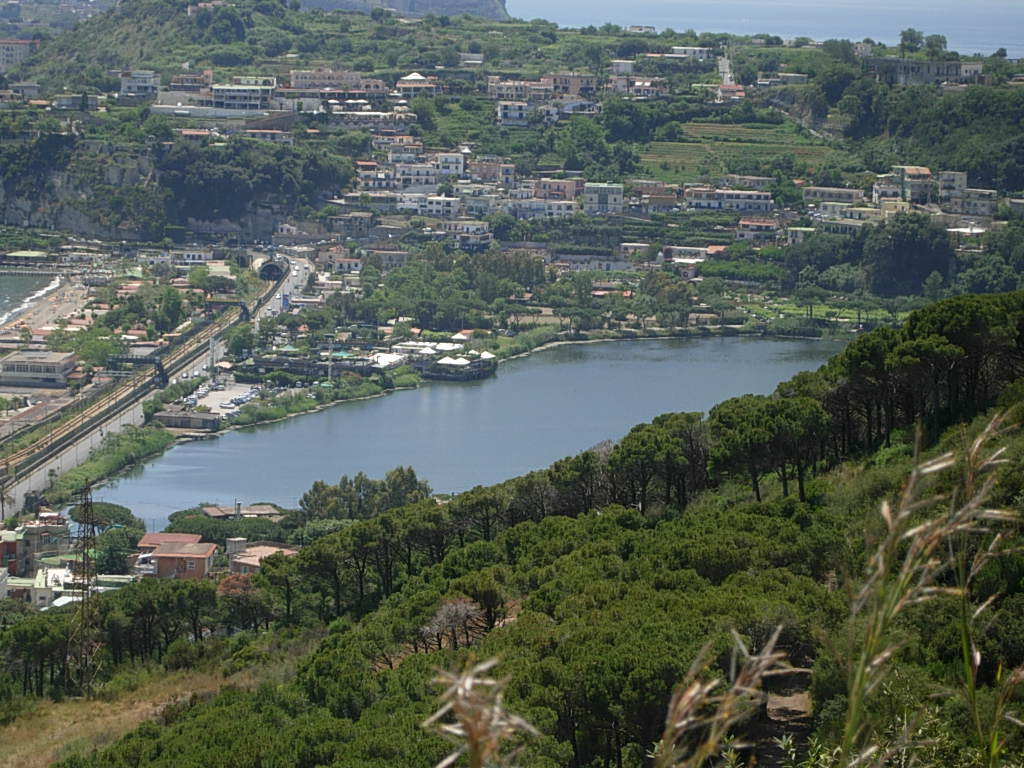
- Present-day lake looking southwest from Monte Nuovo; breakers on the Gulf of Pozzuoli are glimpsed at left, Lago d'Averno at upper right.

- Location within Italy
- Location: Campania, Italy
- Coordinates: 40°49′46″N 14°4′49″E
- Type: Lake
- Max. length: 0.5 kilometres (0.31 mi)
- Max. depth: 5 metres (16 ft)

Lucrinus Lacus or Lucrine Lake (Italian: Lago di Lucrino; Neapolitan: Laco 'e Lucrine) is a lake in Campania, southern Italy.

It is less than one kilometre to the south of Lake Avernus and is separated from the Gulf of Pozzuoli by a narrow strip of land. Also known as the maricello ("little sea"), the size of present-day Lago Lucrino was significantly reduced by the rise of the volcanic cone of Monte Nuovo in 1538. The lake's modern dimensions are 1.5 kilometres (0.93 mi) long and about 5 metres (16 ft) deep.

The recorded history of Lucrinus Lacus dates back to Sergius Orata, who is credited with creating the first oyster beds there. The lake was also a resort destination for residents of Baiae (cf. Martial i. 62). Its banks were covered with villas, of which the best known was Cicero's villa Cumanum on the east bank, which was the seat of his Academia. The remnants of this villa, and the nearby village of Tripergole, disappeared beneath ejecta from the eruption of Monte Nuovo in 1538.

According to a history by Tacitus, Agrippina the Younger was murdered by the emperor Nero's assassins in her villa on the shores of Lucrinus Lacus in AD 59 after escaping an unsuccessful murder attempt while sailing on another craft nearby.

The Via Herculanea and a railway traverse the strip of land between the lake and the Gulf of Pozzuoli.

The ancient Via Herculanea road ran on a strip of land parallel and further to seaward from the present one and now submerged, which Strabo credited to Heracles with constructing. This strip was reinforced with a sea wall and then opened by Marcus Vipsanius Agrippa to make a harbour of Lucrinus Lacus. He then joined Lucrinis Lacus to Lago d'Averno by a canal, as recorded in Virgil's Georgics, providing a sheltered harbour known as Portus Julius for the Roman western fleet, invisible from the sea.

Today Lucrino is a frazione of the comune of Pozzuoli.
