= Onofrio Palumbo =

Italian painter (1606–1650s)

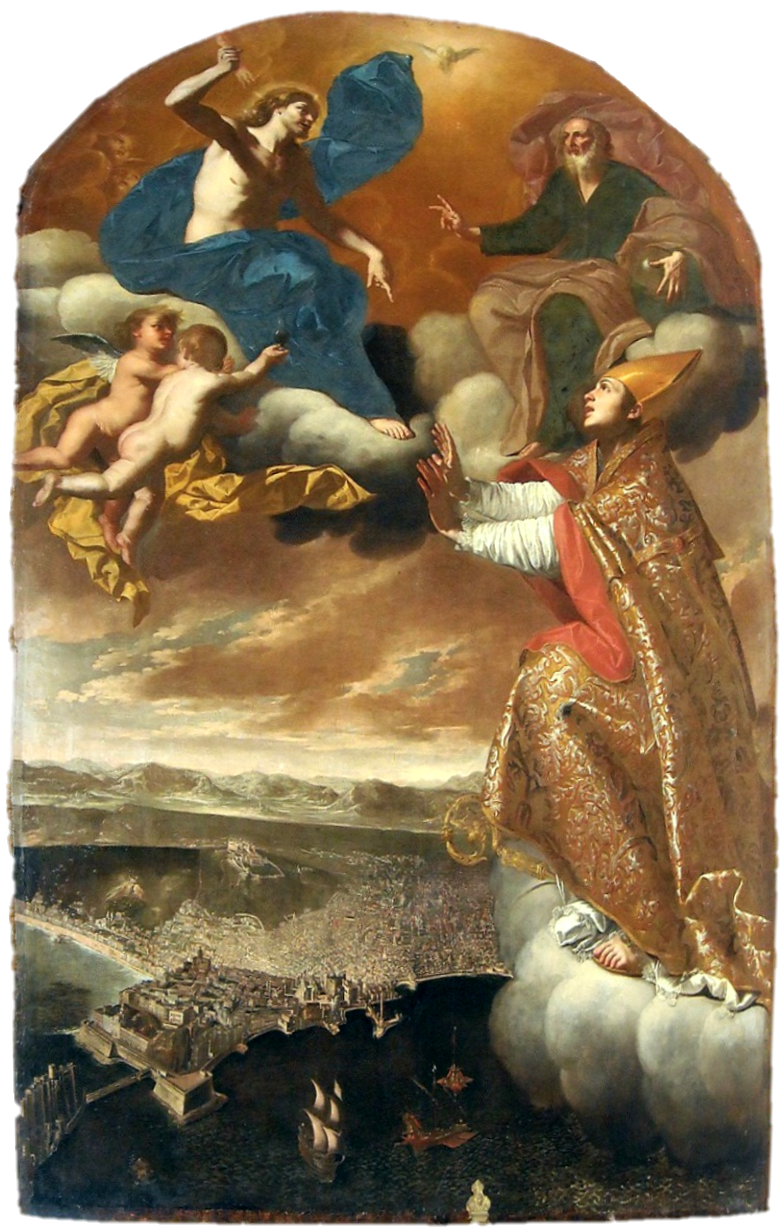
Saint Januarius Protecting Naples from Lightning

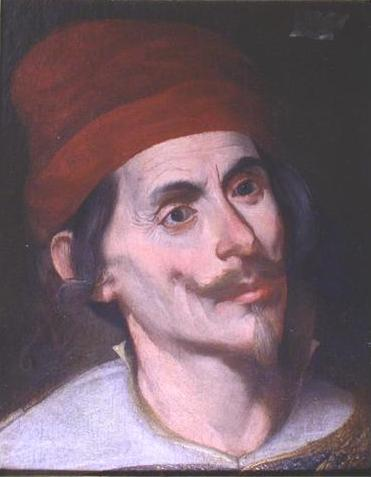
Masaniello by Onofrio Palumbo

Onofrio Palumbo (or Palomba; 1606 in Naples – 1650s in Naples) was an Italian painter of the Baroque period, who was a pupil of Battistello Caracciolo and then of Artemisia Gentileschi in her late years.

He painted an altarpiece of Saint Januarius Protecting Naples from Lightning in the church of the Santissima Trinità dei Pellegrini, an Annunciation and a Nativity of Jesus in Santa Maria della Salute, as well as a contemporary portrait of Masaniello (now at the museum of the Certosa di San Martino) and several other works for several churches and monasteries in Naples.

Other works which have been attributed to him include a Resurrection of Christ (Gemäldegalerie Alte Meister, Dresden; inv. 2666), a Crucifixion (private collection, Zaragoza) and a Liberation of Saint Peter (Whitfield Fine Art, London), as well as collaborative works including Triumph of David (John and Mable Ringling Museum of Art, Sarasota; with Micco Spadaro), Judgement of Paris (Gemäldegalerie der Akademie der bildenden Künste, Vienna; with Gentileschi). He contributed to Artemisia Gentileschi's Susanna and the Elders, and probably her Bathsheba and Adoration of the Magi as well.

Palumbo most likely died around 1656, during the plague epidemic in Naples.

== Sources ==
- Porzio, Giuseppe (2014). "PALUMBO, Onofrio". Dizionario Biografico degli Italiani (in Italian). Vol. 80. Rome: Treccani.
