= Santissima Trinità dei Pellegrini =

Santissima Trinità dei Pellegrini may refer to one of three churches:

- Santissima Trinità dei Pellegrini, Brescia
- Santissima Trinità dei Pellegrini, Naples
- Santissima Trinità dei Pellegrini, Rome
