= Nicaea (disambiguation) =

Nicaea, Nicea, Nikaea or Nikaia (Greek: [place] of victory) may refer to:

== Places ==
- Nicaea, an ancient Greek city in northwestern Anatolia
  - Empire of Nicaea
  - See of Nicaea
  - Duke of Nicaea
  - İznik, modern city in Turkey at the site of Nicaea
- Nicaea (Locris), a fortress city of the Locri Epicnemidii, Greece
- Nicaea (Corsica), an Etruscan settlement
- Nicaea (Thrace), a town of ancient Thrace, now in Turkey
- Nicaea, Punjab, a city built by Alexander the Great, now in Punjab, Pakistan
- Nice, France
- Nikaia, Attica, a suburb of Athens, Greece
- Nikaia, Illyria, an ancient Greek colony in Illyria
- Nikaia, Larissa, a town in the Larissa regional unit, Greece

== People ==
- Nicaea (mythology), a nymph
- Nesaea, a Nereid
- Nicaea of Corinth (fl. 245 BC), wife of Alexander of Corinth
- Nicaea of Macedon (c. 335 BC–c. 302 BC), daughter of Antipater
- Nicea (d. 249 AD), Christian martyr
- Cola Nicea (1886–?), Aromanian soldier

== Other uses ==
- Nikaea (moth), a genus of moth
- Meeting Nikaïa, annual athletics meeting in Nice, France

== See also ==
- Council of Nicaea (disambiguation)
