= Rione Terra =

Archaeological site in Pozzuoli, Italy

Coordinates: 40°49′16″N 14°7′12″E

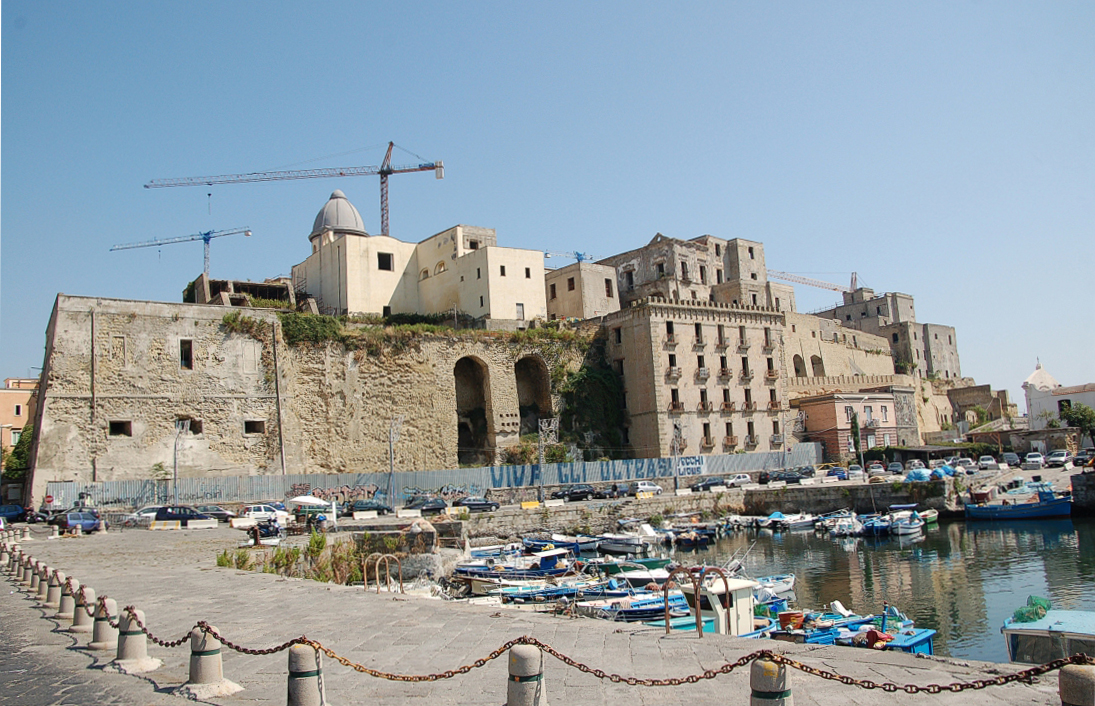
View of Rione Terra from the harbour in 2010 during its restoration.

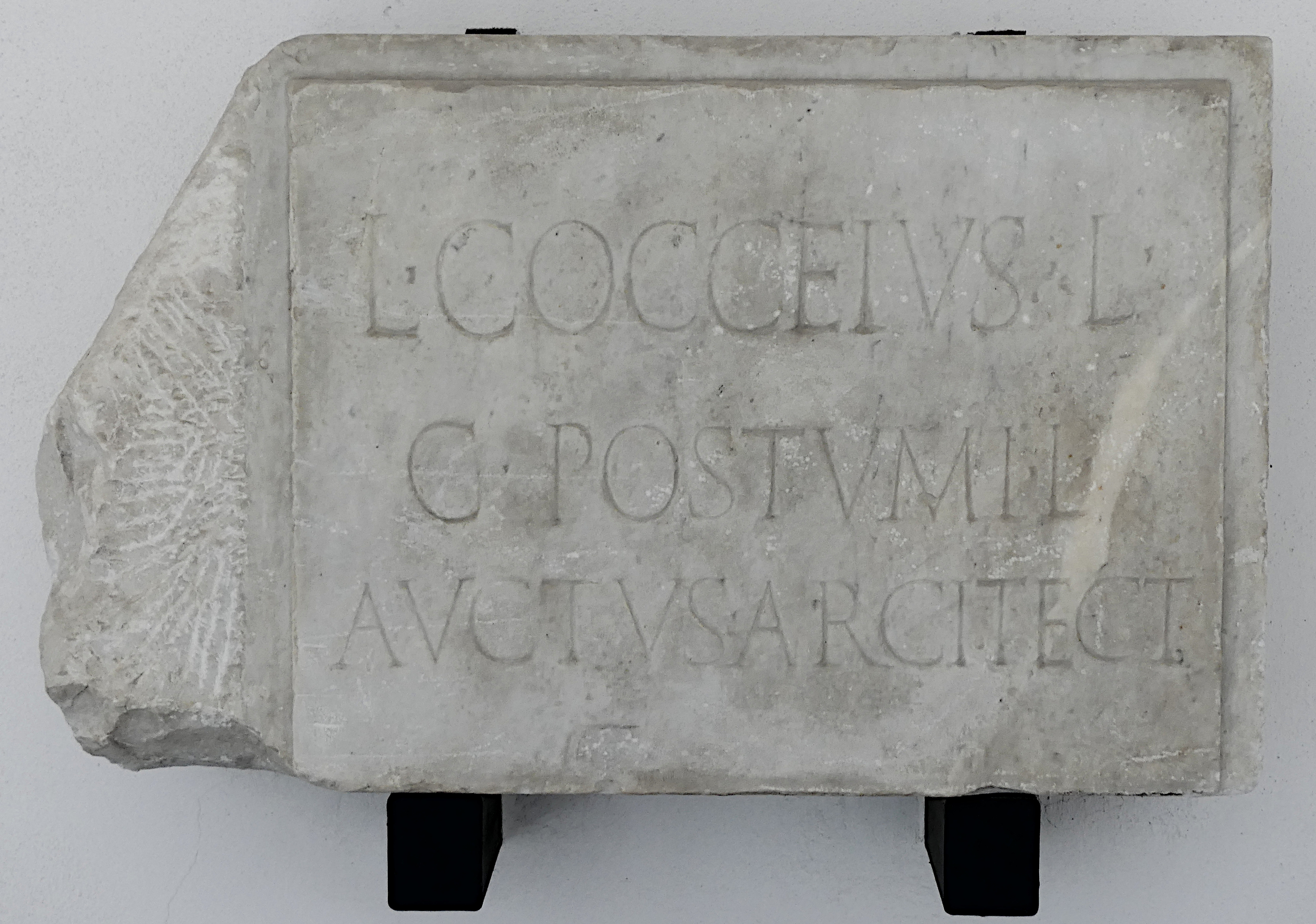
An inscription dedicated to the architect Lucius Cocceius Auctus, which was affixed to the rear of the Temple of Augustus on the Acropolis hill, the Rione Terra near Pozzuoli. He is said to have built this sanctuary.

Rione Terra is a historic quarter in Pozzuoli, Italy, in the Phlegraean Fields region west of Naples. The ancient fortress originally served as the acropolis for the Greek settlement of Dicearkia before being integrated as the Roman port city of Puteoli. The densely built-up district is located on a small tufa promontory overlooking the Gulf of Pozzuoli and today serves as a tourist attraction.

== History ==
Rione Terra was originally a fortress for the settlement of Dicearkia founded by Greek colonists from Samos in the 6th century BCE. The fortress became the Roman colony of Puteoli in 194 BCE and was subsequently reinforced by Roman walls. An ancient Roman temple dating from this time was reconstructed as a temple for Augustus in the 1st century CE in the centre of the fortress. The temple was later converted into the Pozzuoli Cathedral (Duomo) which stands to this day.

With its narrow and ancient streets, Rione Terra was populated until 1970 when it was evacuated due to a sudden bradyseism event that raised the hill on which the district is located by 1.7 m (5.6 ft) relative to sea level. The district was further damaged by the 1980 Irpinia earthquake and was the subject of a restoration and excavation effort beginning in the 1980s. In 2014, Rione Terra reopened to the public as an open-air museum.
