= Gulf of Naples =

Arm of the Mediterranean Sea on the coast of Italy

Coordinates: 40°44′07″N 14°16′31″E

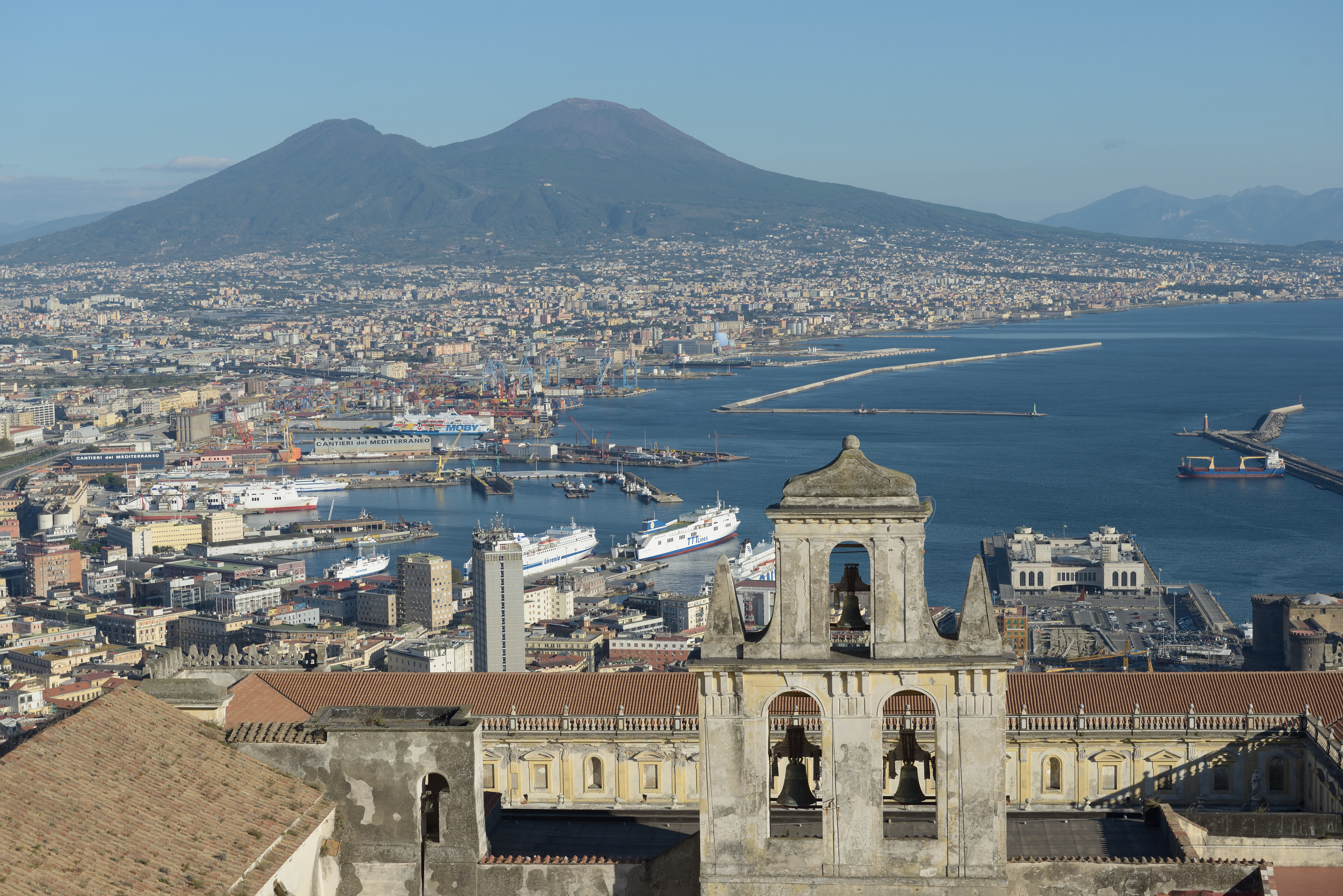
Gulf of Naples at Naples, with Mount Vesuvius on the horizon.

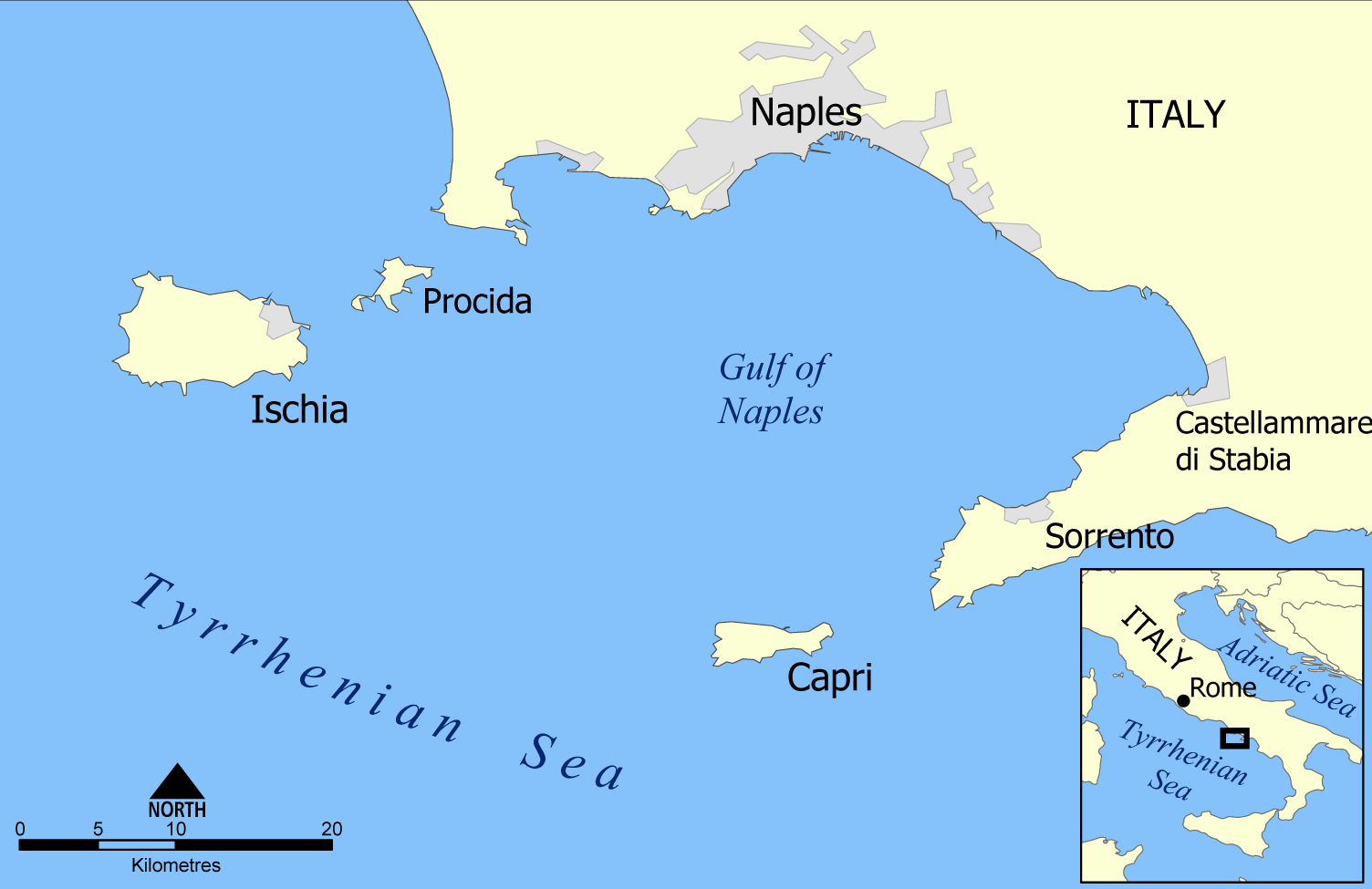
Regional map of the Gulf of Naples.

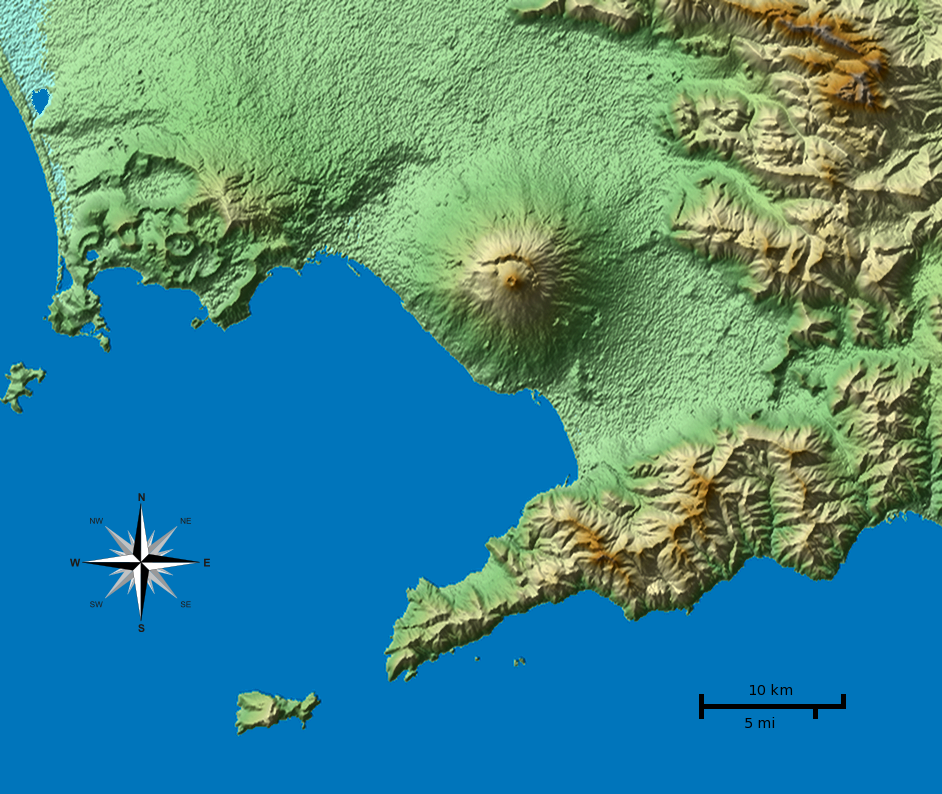
Topographic map of the Gulf of Naples and Mount Vesuvius

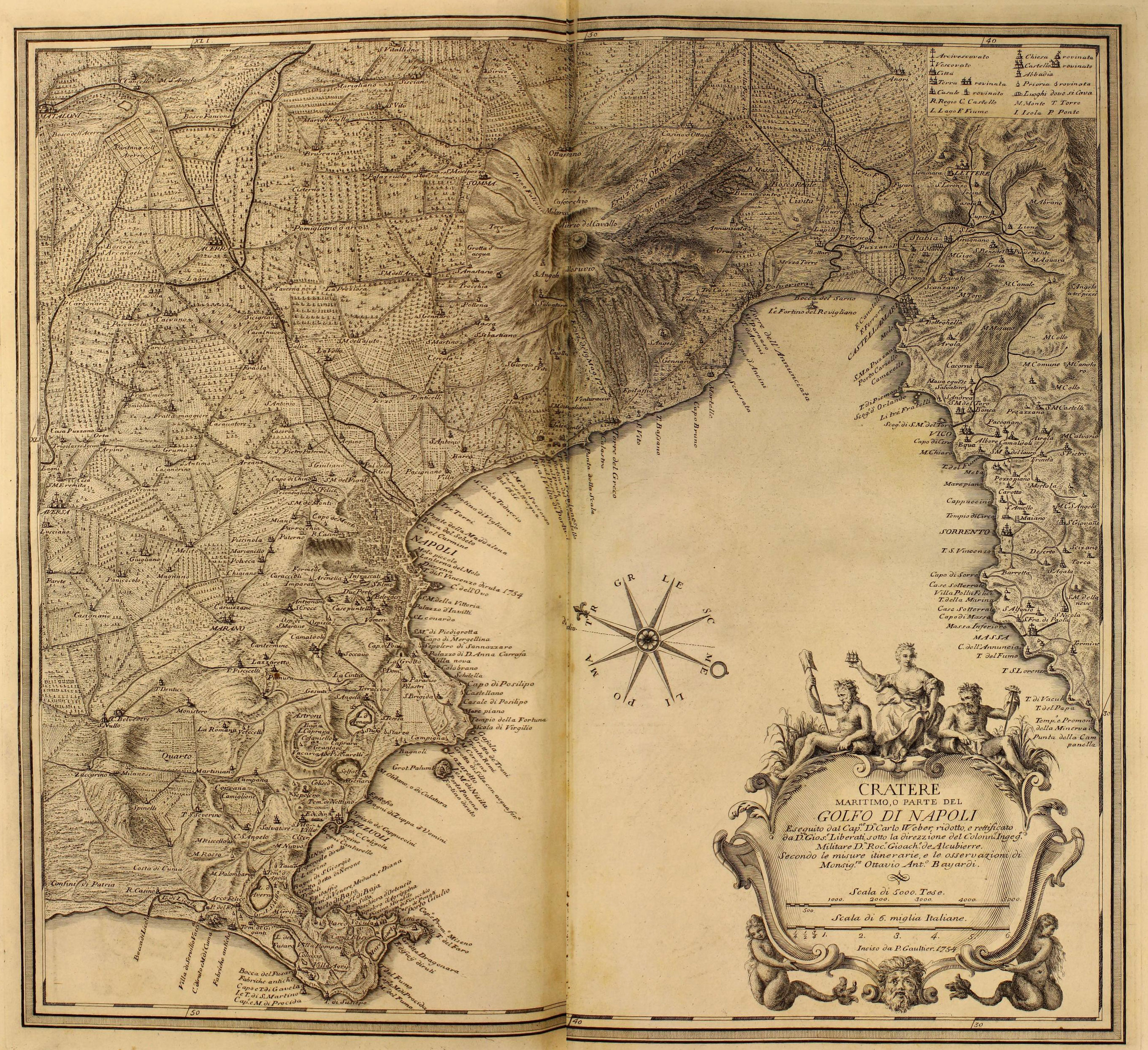
Map of the Gulf of Napoli 1754

The Gulf of Naples (Italian: Golfo di Napoli; Neapolitan: Gurfo 'e Napole), also called the Bay of Naples, is a roughly 15-kilometer-wide (9.3 mi) coastline along the Tyrrhenian Sea, which entirely faces the Metropolitan City of Naples (region of Campania, Italy). It opens to the west into the Mediterranean Sea. It is bordered on the north by the cities of Naples and Pozzuoli, on the east by Mount Vesuvius, and on the south by the Sorrento Peninsula and the main town of the peninsula, Sorrento. The Peninsula separates the Gulf of Naples from the Gulf of Salerno, which includes the Amalfi Coast.

The islands of Capri, Ischia and Procida are located in the Gulf of Naples. The area is a tourist destination, with the seaside Roman ruins of Pompeii and Herculaneum at the foot of Mount Vesuvius (destroyed in the AD 79 eruption of Vesuvius), along the north coast.

Along with the island of Ischia and gulfs of Pozzuoli and Gaeta, local waters are home to varieties of whales and dolphins including fin and sperm whales.

== History ==
It is said that the Roman emperor Caligula built a bridge of boats across the bay and rode across it in a chariot while wearing the armor of Alexander the Great. The Roman biographer Suetonius writes of Caligula in The Twelve Caesars:

He invented besides a new kind of spectacle, such as had never been heard of before. For he made a bridge, of about three miles and a half in length, from Baiae to the mole of Puteoli, collecting trading vessels from all quarters, mooring them in two rows by their anchors, and spreading earth upon them to form a viaduct, after the fashion of the Appian Way. This bridge he crossed and recrossed for two days together; the first day mounted on a horse richly caparisoned, wearing on his head a crown of oak leaves, armed with a battle-axe, a Spanish buckler and a sword, and in a cloak made of cloth of gold; the day following, in the habit of a charioteer, standing in a chariot, drawn by two high-bred horses, having with him a young boy, Darius by name, one of the Parthian hostages, with a cohort of the Praetorian guards attending him, and a party of his friends in cars of Gaulish make. Most people, I know, are of opinion, that this bridge was designed by Caius, in imitation of Xerxes, who, to the astonishment of the world, laid a bridge over the Hellespont, which is somewhat narrower than the distance betwixt Baiae and Puteoli. Others, however, thought that he did it to strike terror in Germany and Britain, which he was upon the point of invading, by the fame of some prodigious work. But for myself, when I was a boy, I heard my grandfather say, that the reason assigned by some courtiers who were in habits of the greatest intimacy with him, was this; when Tiberius was in some anxiety about the nomination of a successor, and rather inclined to pitch upon his grandson, Thrasyllus the astrologer had assured him, “That Caius would no more be emperor, than he would ride on horseback across the gulf of Baiae.”

The Gulf of Naples hosted the sailing events for the 1960 Summer Olympics in Rome.

== See also ==
- Killiney Bay in Dublin, Ireland, whose vista is often compared to that of the Bay of Naples
