= Santa Maria della Consolazione, Pozzuoli =

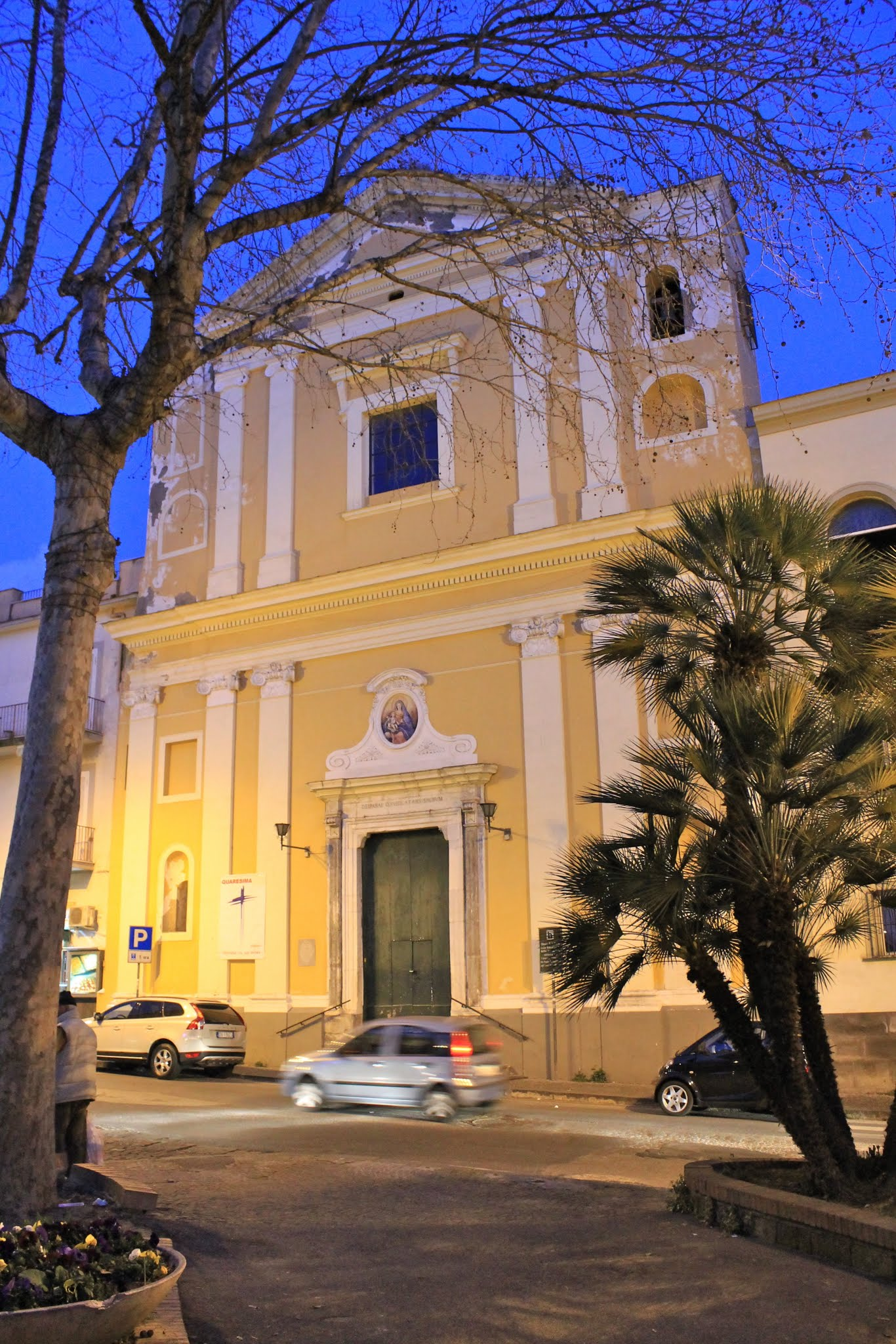
Facade

Santa Maria della Consolazione is a church dedicated to Our Lady of Consolation in Pozzuoli, Italy.

The building originated as "San Giacomo apostolo", a church dedicated to James the Great and first built between the end of the 15th century and the start of the 16th century by Carmelite brothers from Santa Maria del Carmine, Naples. It was rebuilt early in the 1600s and totally restored in the second half of the 18th century. The Carmelites left Pozzuoli in 1807 and between 1810 and 1817 the church was rededicated by Alfonso Castaldo, bishop of Pozzuoli, to the Carmelite devotion of Our Lady of Consolation.

The church also contains an image of the Virgin Mary now known as the 'Madonna del parto' or 'Madonna of childbirth' because Ferdinand II of the Two Sicilies and his wife Maria Theresia came to pray before it during her pregnancy. It was turned into a parish church on 11 April 1943 and from 1964 to 2014 served as the pro-cathedral for the Diocese of Pozzuoli while Pozzuoli Cathedral was being restored.
