= Santa Maria Materdomini, Naples =

Church building in Naples, Italy

Coordinates: 40.847352°N 14.247758°E

Santa Maria Materdomini is a Roman Catholic church located near piazzetta Fabrizio Pignatelli, in Naples, Italy

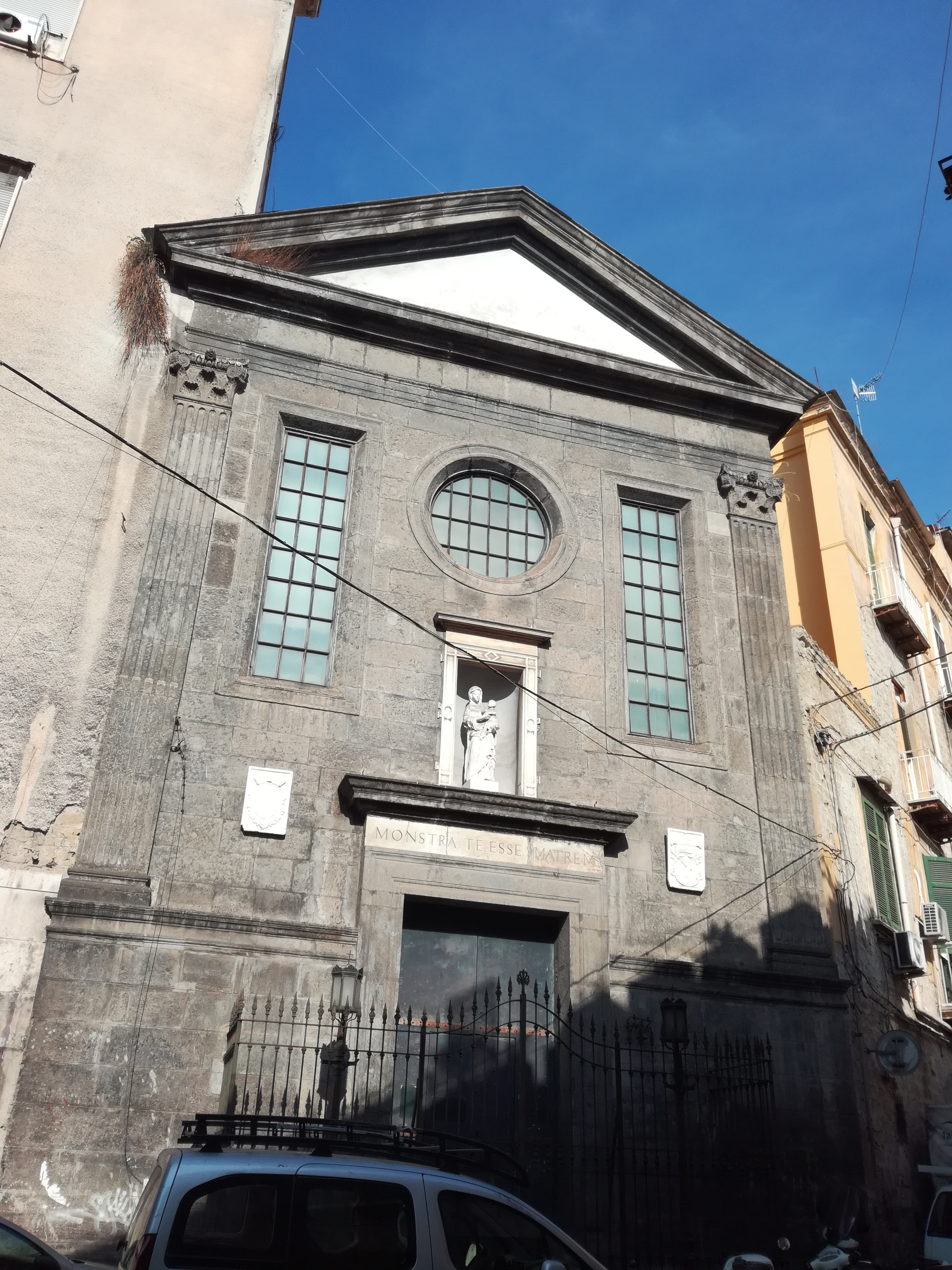
Façade

== History ==
The church was founded in 1573–75 by the Fabrizio Pignatelli, brother of the second duke of Monteleone, knight of the Priory of Jerusalem (Gerosolimitani or Knights Hospitaller), and former Bailiff of Santa Eufemia in Calabria. As a knight or leader of knights, Pignatelli had fought in the defense of the Siege of Rhodes (1522), Tripoli (1544)(see Siege of Tripoli (1551), and Siege of Malta (1565). The church was constructed adjacent the Hospital of "Santissima Trinità dei Pellegrini". Upon the death of the patron, the church was then ceded to Archiconfraternity which already ran the hospital.

The façade was designed by Giovanni Francesco Di Palma. On the entry door was a Madonna con Bambino by Francesco Laurana (15th century), now found on the main altar. The interior contains the marble and bronze Funereal Monument of Fabrizio Pignatelli, commissioned in 1590 from Michelangelo Naccherino and completed in 1609. To the left of the monument is a painting depicting the Virgin with Pilgrims and Charity (1721) by Leonardo Olivieri, a pupil of Solimena On the right of the tomb is a painting by Nicola Malinconico depicting Virgin with Saints Gennaro and Francesco di Paola. The church also has a 19th-century Funereal Monument of Maria Luisa Colonna di Stigliano, by Francesco Liberti.

== Bibliography ==
- Vincenzo Regina, Le chiese di Napoli. Viaggio indimenticabile attraverso la storia artistica, architettonica, letteraria, civile e spirituale della Napoli sacra, Newton and Compton editor, Naples 2004.
- Giuseppe de Simone, Le chiese di Napoli descritte ed illustrate da Giuseppe de Simone con tavole. First Volume. (1845), Tipografia Genio, Naples. page 61–62.
