= Proculus and Nicea =

Two Christian martyrs

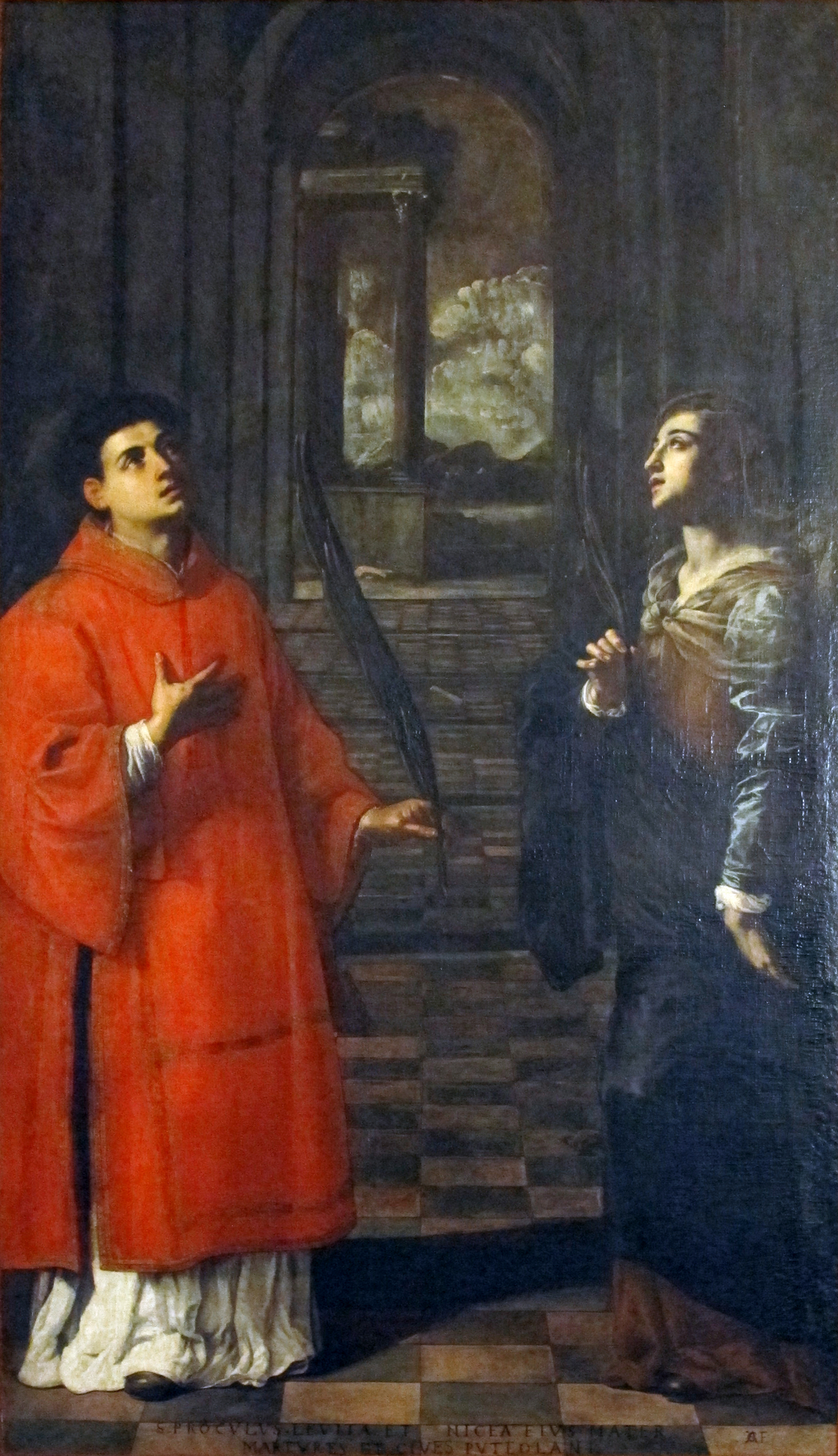
Artemisia Gentileschi, Saints Proculus and Nicea (1637), Pozzuoli Cathedral

Proculus and Nicea were two Christian martyrs. According to Jean Bolland and Camillo Tutini, they were martyred in 249 during the Decian persecutions; Proculus was a deacon (with the same name as the city's patron saint) and Nicea was his mother. According to tradition they are buried in Pozzuoli Cathedral, where they are venerated. They were painted in 1637 by Artemisia Gentileschi.

== Bibliography (in Italian) ==
- Scipione Mazzella, Sito, et Antichità della città di Pozzvolo e del svo amenissimo distretto, Napoli 1591
- Angelo D'Ambrosio, Storia di Pozzuoli… in pillole, Pozzuoli 1959
