= Sergius Orata =

Ancient Roman civil engineer and inventor

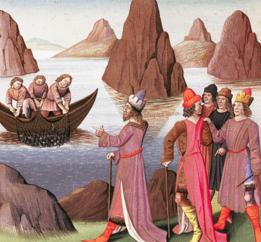
Sergius Orata demonstrates his method of oyster cultivation. From a medieval French illustration.

Gaius Sergius Orata (fl. c. 95 BC) was an Ancient Roman who was a successful merchant, inventor and hydraulic engineer. He is credited with inventing the cultivation of oysters and refinement to the hypocaust method of heating a building to provide, in addition, heated water for bathing.

== Origins of his name ==
The writer Festus noted "The Orata", the gilt-headed bream, "is a kind of fish so called for its golden color (aurata, "golden," also spelled orata)." ... "Because of this, it's said about the very wealthy Sergius that they called him orata, because he wore two big rings of gold. Some authorities assert that his nickname just comes from the commercialization of those fishes."

== Biography ==
Sergius was well known to his contemporaries for the breeding and commercialization of oysters, of which he was a noted innovator. Orata wanted to take advantage of the wealthy Romans' liking for shellfish as food, so he developed many new techniques for breeding oysters. This included the practice of surrounding mature oysters with twigs, to which their young (known as "spats") could affix themselves and thus be easily transplanted wherever desired. This allowed for the creation of artificial oyster beds, which he surrounded with channels and dams in order to protect them from the sea tides.

He based his business at the Lucrine Lake in Campania, which was adjacent to the luxurious and popular spa town of Baiae. This brought him into conflict with the local Roman tax farmer Considius, in a dispute over his use of the public resource of the lakefront for his business. Consilius was successfully defended in the legal case by the orator Crassus.

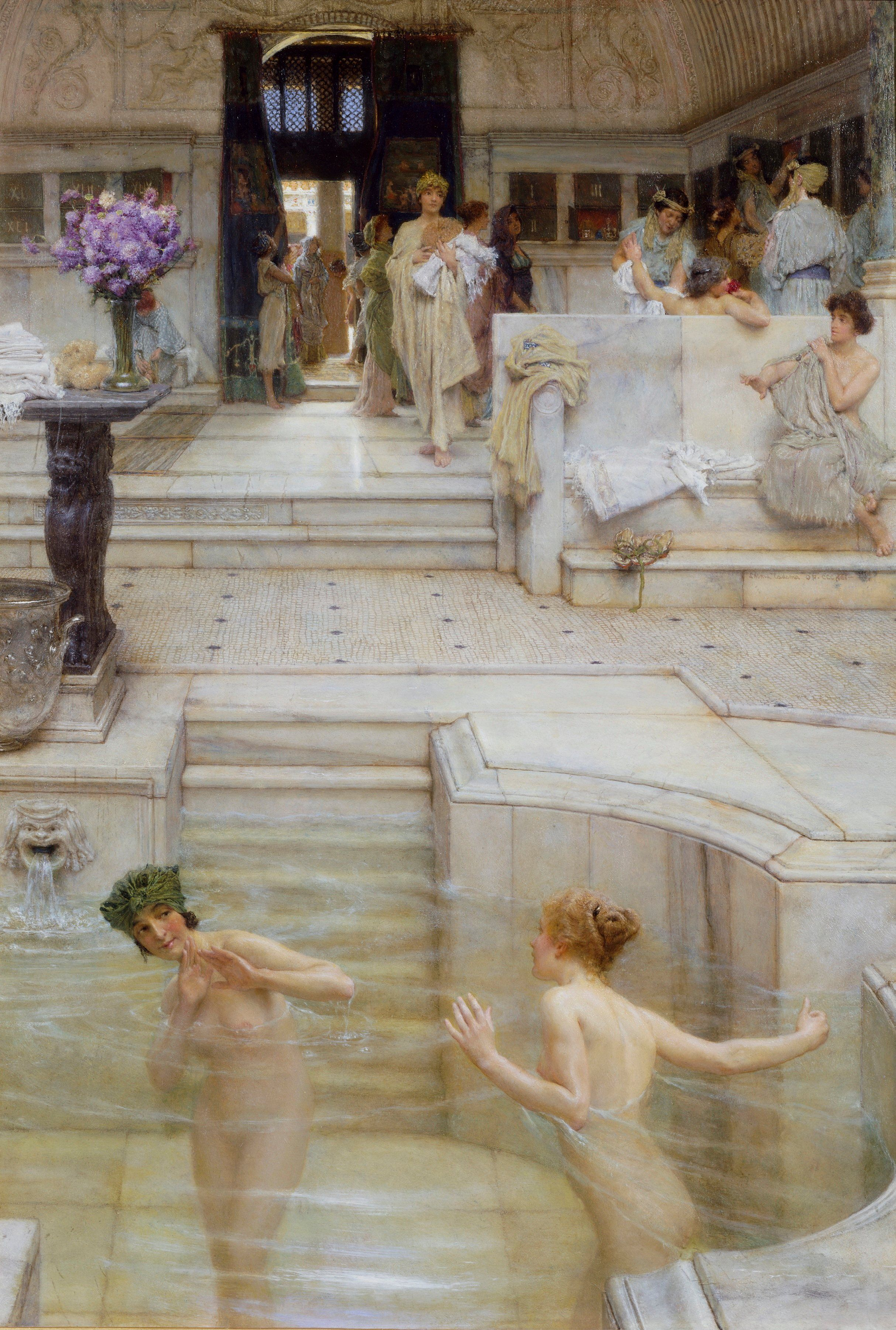
A Roman indoor heated bathing pool. A Favourite Custom by Lawrence Alma-Tadema, 1909

Orata was also a significant developer and builder of luxury villas in the area, Crassus made a joke based on the common use of terra cotta tiles both as surfaces for artificial oyster beds and also in the roofs of structures, saying that "even if Orata were deprived of the waters of the lake, he would still find oysters on his roof-tiles".

Orata was also credited by the writer Vitruvius with the invention of the hypocaust (underfloor heating), although this is not fully established. What is certain is that he invented a new type of "hanging baths" ("bal(i)nea pensilia"), which were a kind of relaxing thermal spa baths; that are usually considered to be related to hypocausts. He commercialized them as he had his oyster business. He claimed healing and soothing properties to his invention and this helped Orata to market it successfully. They became fashionable among the wealthy, to the point that no luxury mansion could be considered complete without one of Orata's pools.

Sergius Orata became rich due to his inventions; he was himself noted for his love for luxury and refinement.

== See also ==
- Hypocaust
- Sergia gens

== Bibliography ==
- Smith, William (1849). Dictionary of Greek and Roman Biography and Mythology. Vol. 3. C. C. Little and J. Brown; [etc., etc. ]. pp. 40, 185–186. LCCN 07038839.
- Holland, Tom. (2003). Rubicon. Doubleday. ISBN 9780385503136.
