= Santissima Trinità dei Pellegrini, Naples =

Church of Most Holy Trinity of Pilgrims
- Chiesa della Santissima Trinità dei Pellegrini
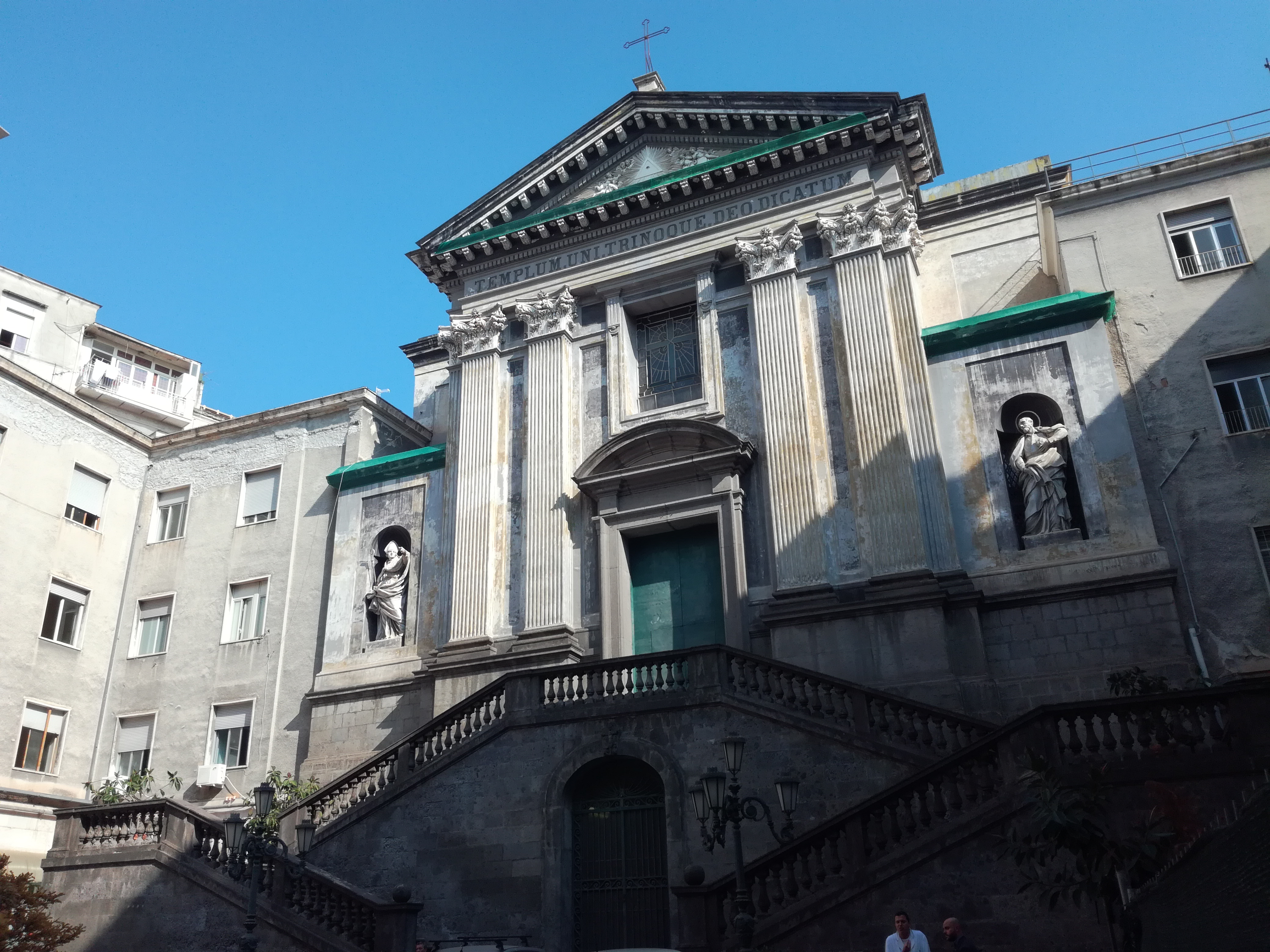
- Facade and steps.
- Church of Most Holy Trinity of Pilgrims
- 40.847540°N 14.247450°E
- Location: Via Portamedina; Naples; Province of Naples, Campania
- Country: Italy
- Denomination: Roman Catholic

History
- Status: Active

Architecture
- Architectural type: Baroque architecture

Administration
- Diocese: Roman Catholic Archdiocese of Naples

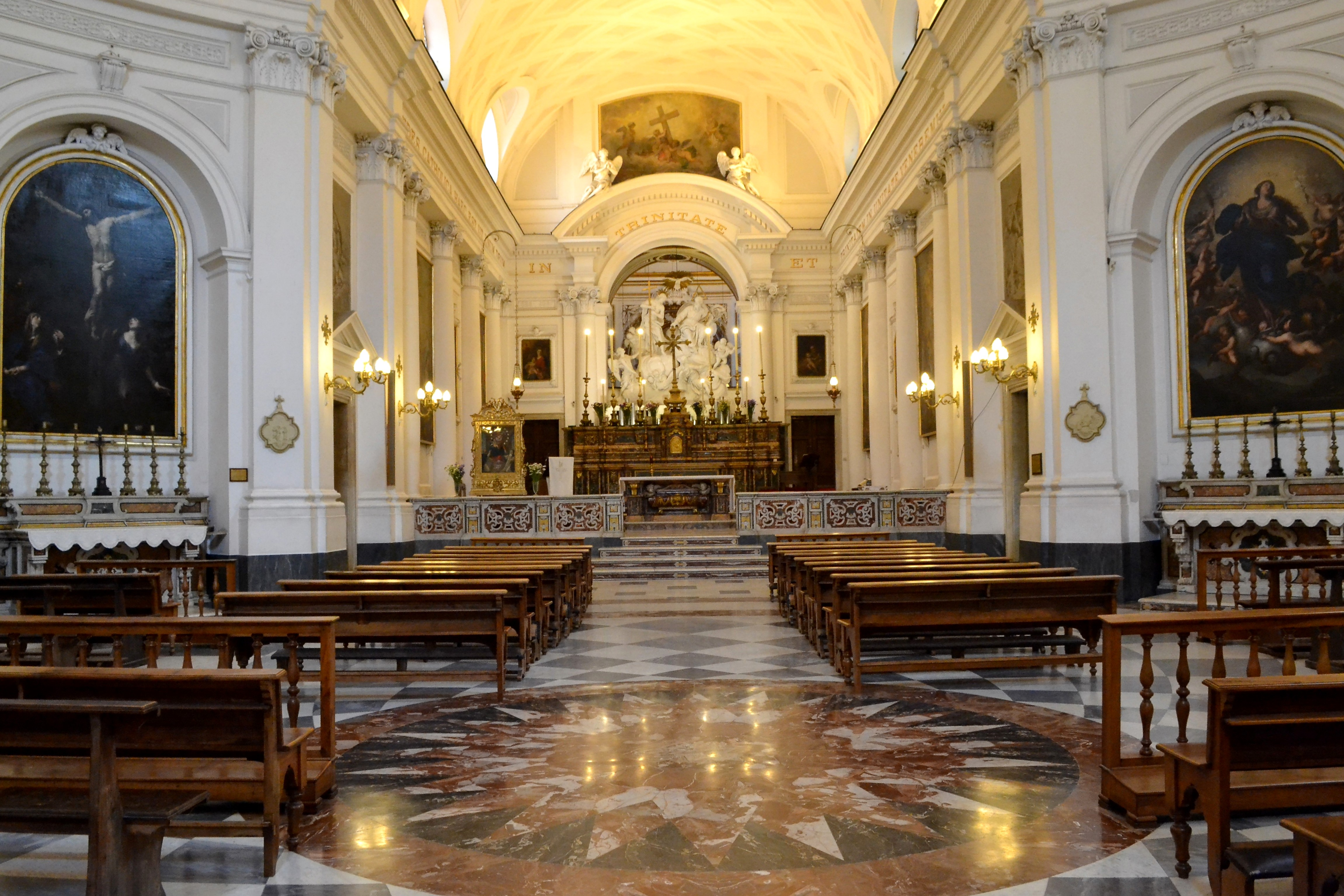
Sculptures round the high altar

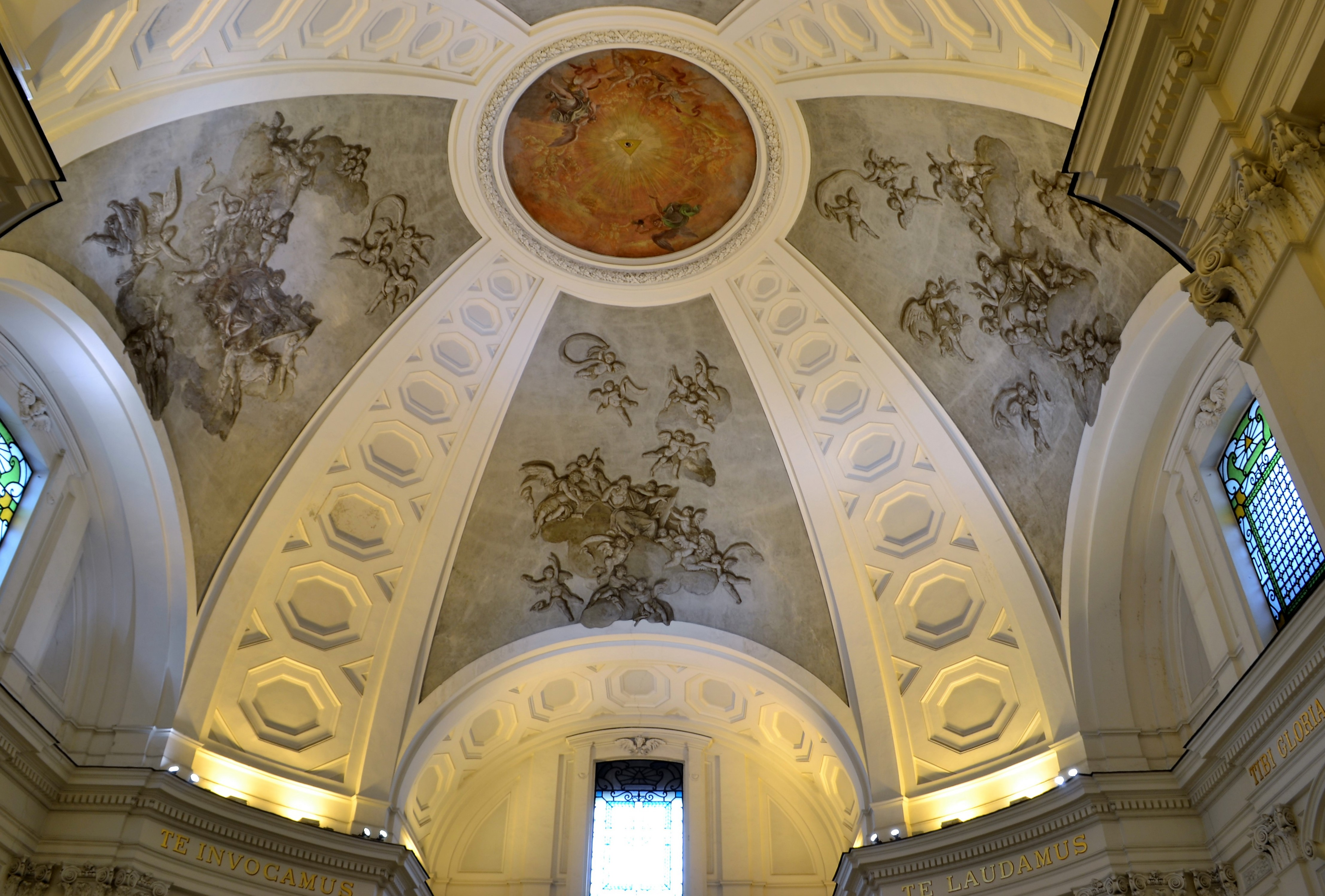
Dome.

The Santissima Trinità dei Pellegrini (Most Holy Trinity of Pilgrims) is a church on via Portamedina in the historic city centre of Naples, Italy.

== History ==
The church building and the eponymous hospital was founded in the sixteenth century by Fabrizio Pignatelli di Monteleone, a member of the Knight of Jerusalem, and later, the complex, was given to the Brotherhood of the Holy Trinity. The hospital attached therein, the structure was designed by Carlo Vanvitelli, and enlarged along with the church in 1769. The church connects on the right nave with the small church of Santa Maria Materdomini.

== Description ==
The facade is characterized by fine stucco statues of Angelo Viva, representing San Filippo Neri and San Gennaro.

The architecture of the temple is somewhat unusual; the floor plan is formed by two octagons joined by a rectangle, with the first octagon which assumes the function of the nave and the second serving as oratory, while the rectangle is the presbytery. On the high altar there are works in stucco by Viva, with the two sides as many paintings by Paolo De Matteis, both representing St. Joseph with Child Jesus, while other paintings are attributed to the school of Giuseppe Bonito. The choir of the church (1754) was designed by Giovanni Antonio Medrano with a rich decoration, also in stucco. Giovanni was in charge of the restructuring of all the buildings of the Archconfraternity of the Santissima Trinità dei Pellegrini, including the church, which he conceived according to a Latin cross layout. On the first altar on the left, by Onofrio Palumbo is a San Gennaro protecting Naples from lightning. In the church there is also a bust of the adviser Ferrante Magdalene, first counselor of the king, who is buried there.

== See also ==
- 18th-century Western domes
