= Gulf of Pozzuoli =

Small gulf in the northwestern end of the Gulf of Naples

Coordinates: 40.82147°N 14.09391°E

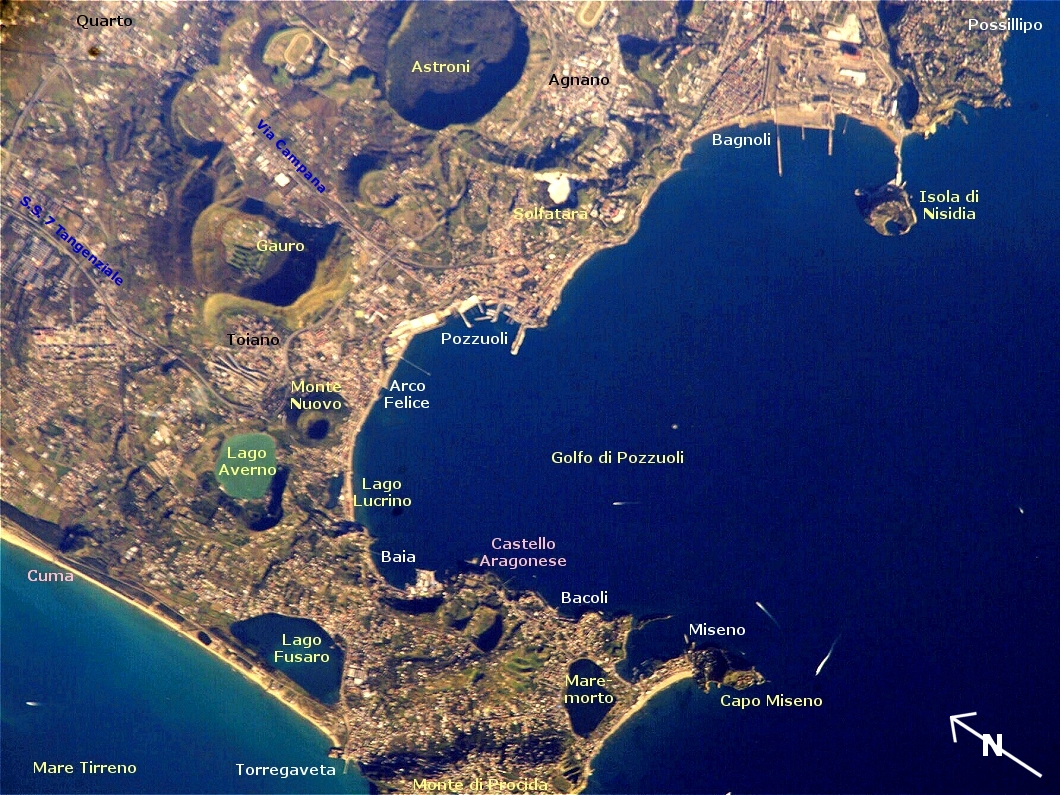
Gulf of Pozzuoli and surroundings

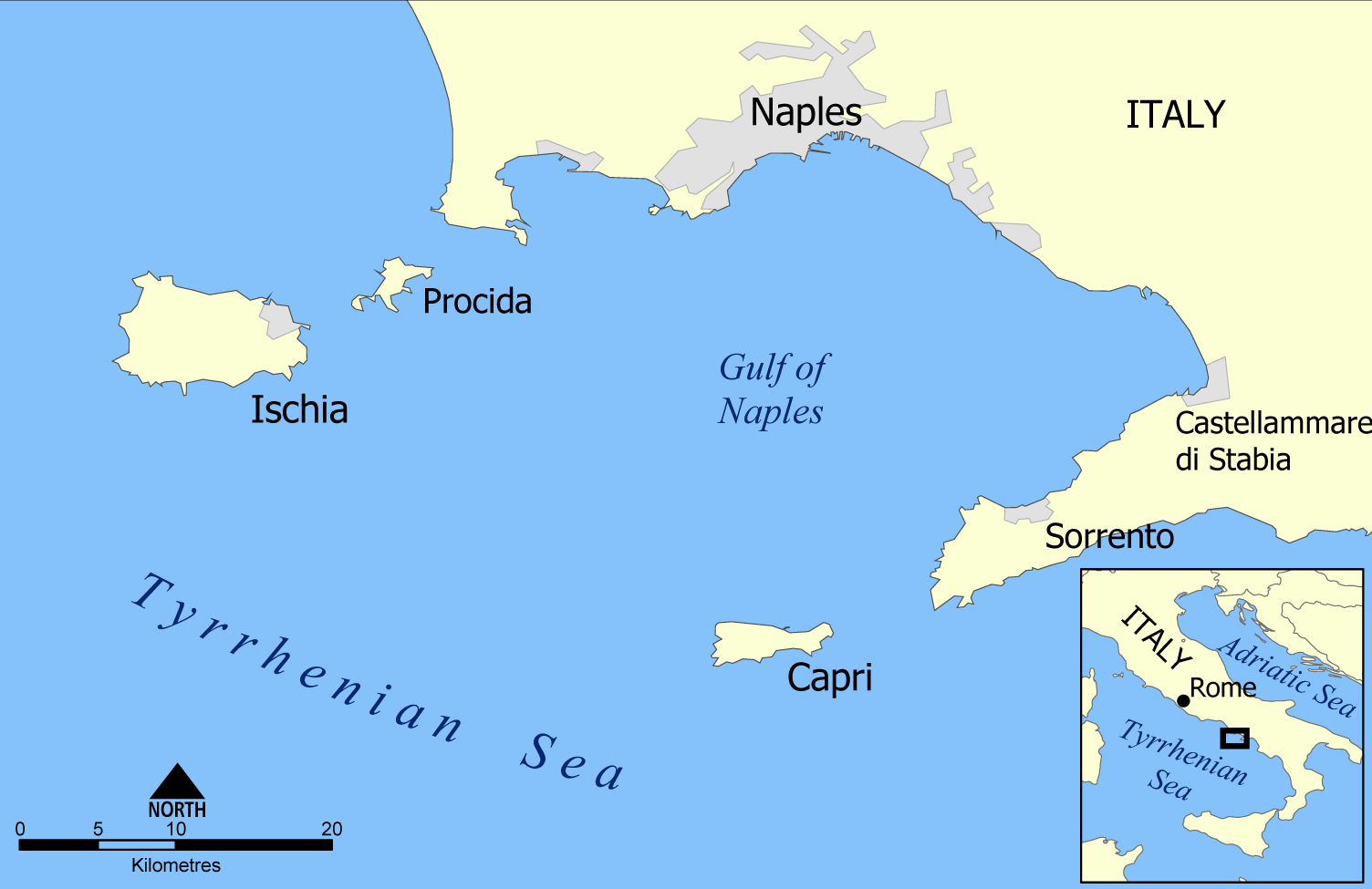
The Gulf of Pozzuoli lies on the northwestern end of the Gulf of Naples.

The Gulf of Pozzuoli (Italian: Golfo di Pozzuoli; Neapolitan: Gurfo 'e Pezzulo), formerly known as the Gulf of Puteoli, is a large bay or small gulf in the northwestern end of the Gulf of Naples in the Tyrrhenian Sea. It lies west of Naples and is named for its port of Pozzuoli. The Roman Sinus Baianus was located within it, near the resort town of Baiae.

Along with the island of Ischia and gulfs of Naples and Gaeta, local waters are rich in productions enough to support various species of whales and dolphins, including fin and sperm whales.

== See also ==
- Geography of Italy
