= Monte Nuovo =

Mountain in Italy

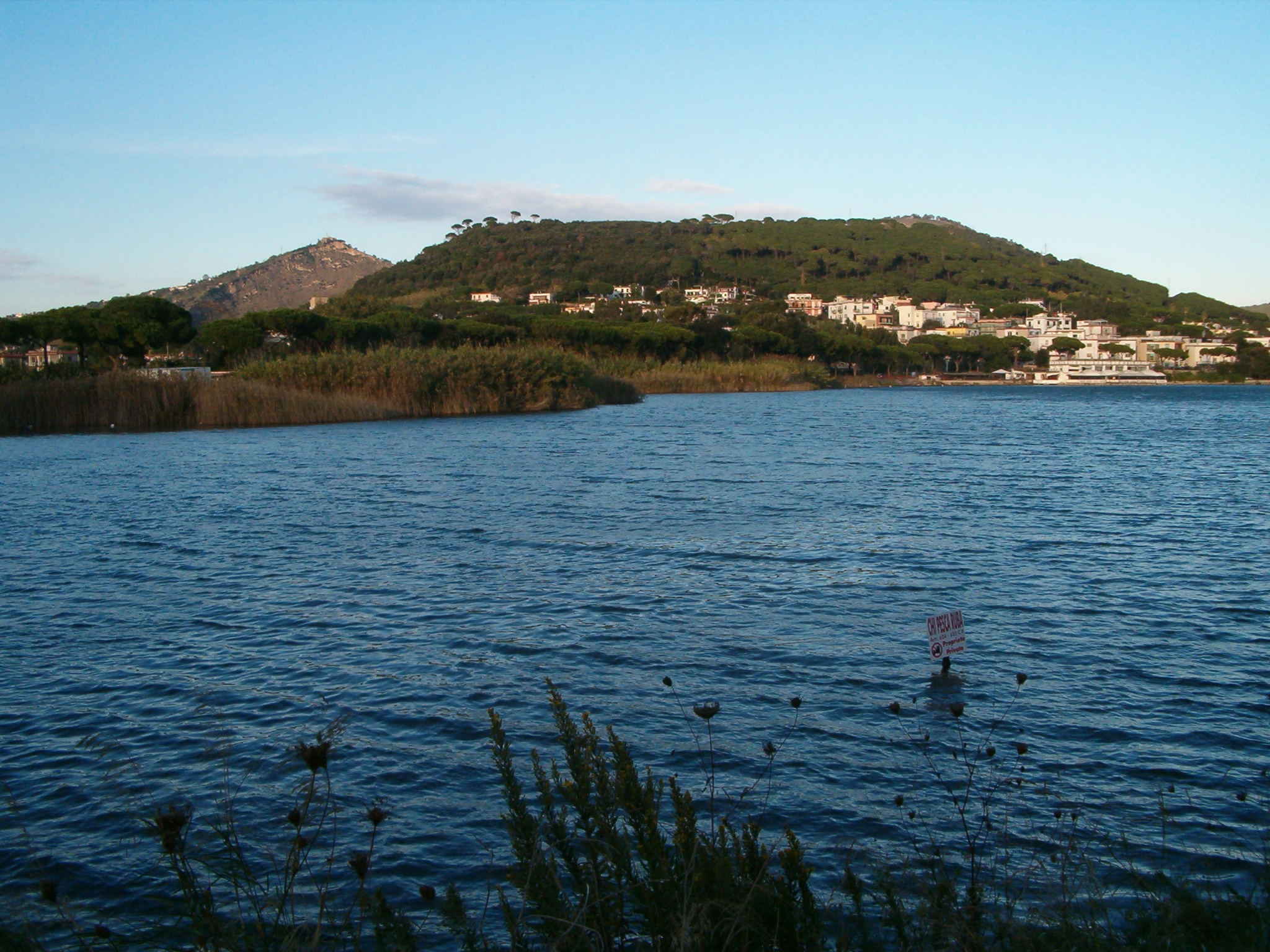
- Monte Nuovo. View from Lucrine Lake.

Highest point
- Elevation: 132 m (433 ft)
- Coordinates: 40°50′7″N 14°5′17″E

Geography
- Location within Italy
- Location: Campania, Italy

Geology
- Mountain type: Cinder cone
- Volcanic arc: Campanian volcanic arc
- Last eruption: 1538

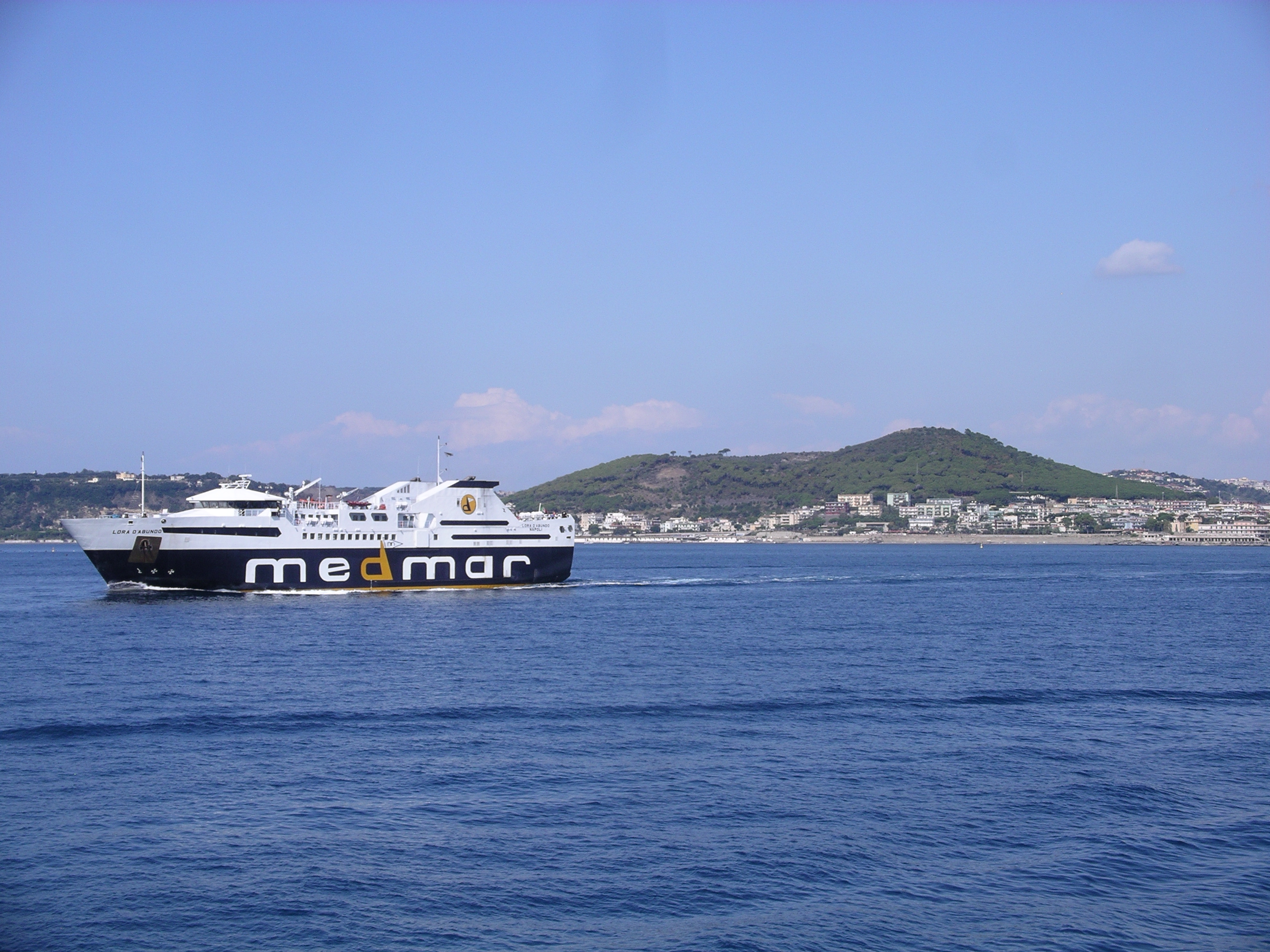
Monte Nuovo

Monte Nuovo ("New Mountain") is a cinder cone volcano within the Campi Flegrei caldera, near Naples, southern Italy. A series of damaging earthquakes and changes in land elevation preceded its only eruption, during the most recent part of the Holocene, which lasted from September 29 to October 6, 1538, when it was formed. The event is important in the history of science because it was the first eruption in modern times to be described by a large number of witnesses. The eruptive vent formed next to the medieval village of Tripergole on the shores of the then-much larger Lake Lucrino. The thermal bath village, which had been inhabited since ancient Roman times and was home to notable Roman-era buildings including Cicero's villa, was completely buried by ejecta from the new tuff cone. Tripergole's ruins and its important thermal springs completely disappeared under Monte Nuovo such that the exact location of the village can no longer be identified.

Volcanologists feared another eruption between 1969 and 1984, when there were again earthquakes and changes in land elevations in the area.

In September 2023, after an earthquake, concerns over a possible eruption were again raised by volcanologists.
