= Pozzuoli Cathedral =

Church in Pozzuoli, Italy

Coordinates: 40.8214°N 14.1206°E

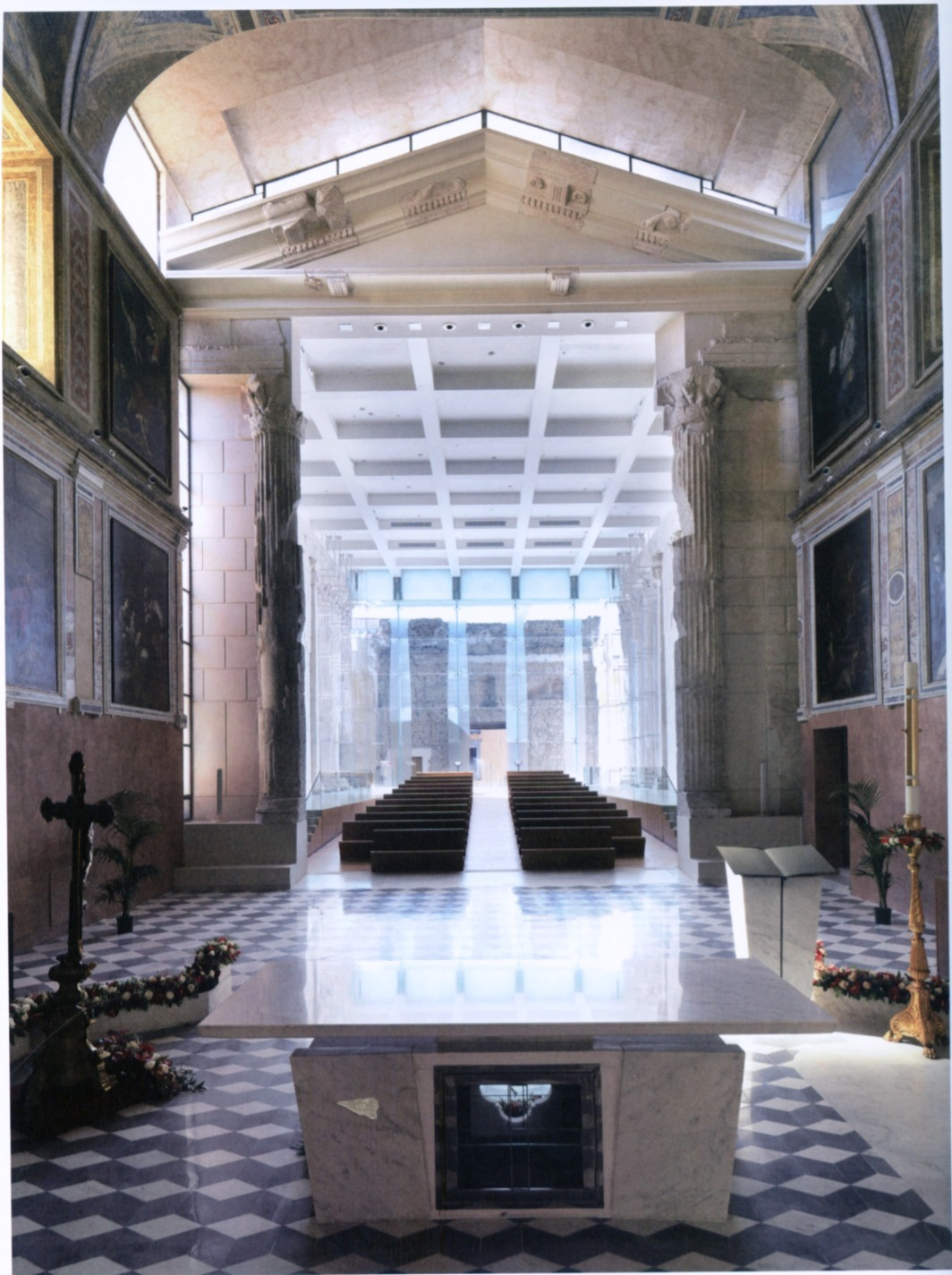
Interior of the nave

Pozzuoli Cathedral or the Basilica of San Procolo martire is the main Roman Catholic church in Pozzuoli and the seat of the Diocese of Pozzuoli. It sits at the top of the Rione Terra and is built around an ancient Roman temple.

== History ==
=== Origins ===
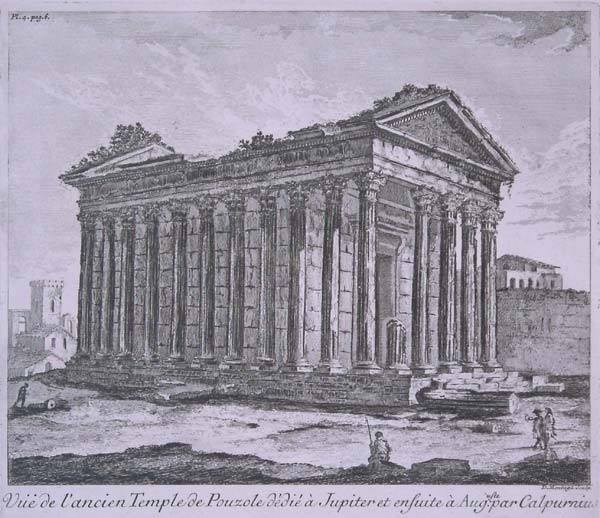
18th century reconstruction of the temple

The site probably originated as part of the town's capitolium of the Greek or Samnite era, radically rebuilt in the Republican and Augustan eras. The church was first housed in a former Roman temple, the Temple of Augustus built by the rich merchant Lucius Calpurnius. Its dedicatory inscription survives, reading L. Calpurnius L.f. templum Aug. cum ornamentis d.s.f. (Lucius Calpurnius, son of Lucius, dedicated this temple and its ornamentation to Augustus at his own expense). It was designed by the architect Cocceius Auctus on the remains of an earlier Republican temple built in 194 BC, which had been restored by Sulla in 78 BC. The Temple of Augustus was a pseudoperipteral hexastyle temple, with nine fluted Corinthian columns along each long side and a rectangular cella formed of white marble blocks. The whole temple was built without the use of mortar. Between the end of the 5th and the start of the 6th century the inhabitants of the town decided to rededicate the temple as a church to Proculus of Pozzuoli. In 1538 it suffered major damage as Tripergole subsided and Monte Nuovo was formed. Bishop Gian Matteo Castaldo restored it, funding it by selling off all the episcopal stable-ware of the value of 200 gold ducats or less, for which he was given permission by Pope Paul III on 16 June 1544.

=== 1800–present ===
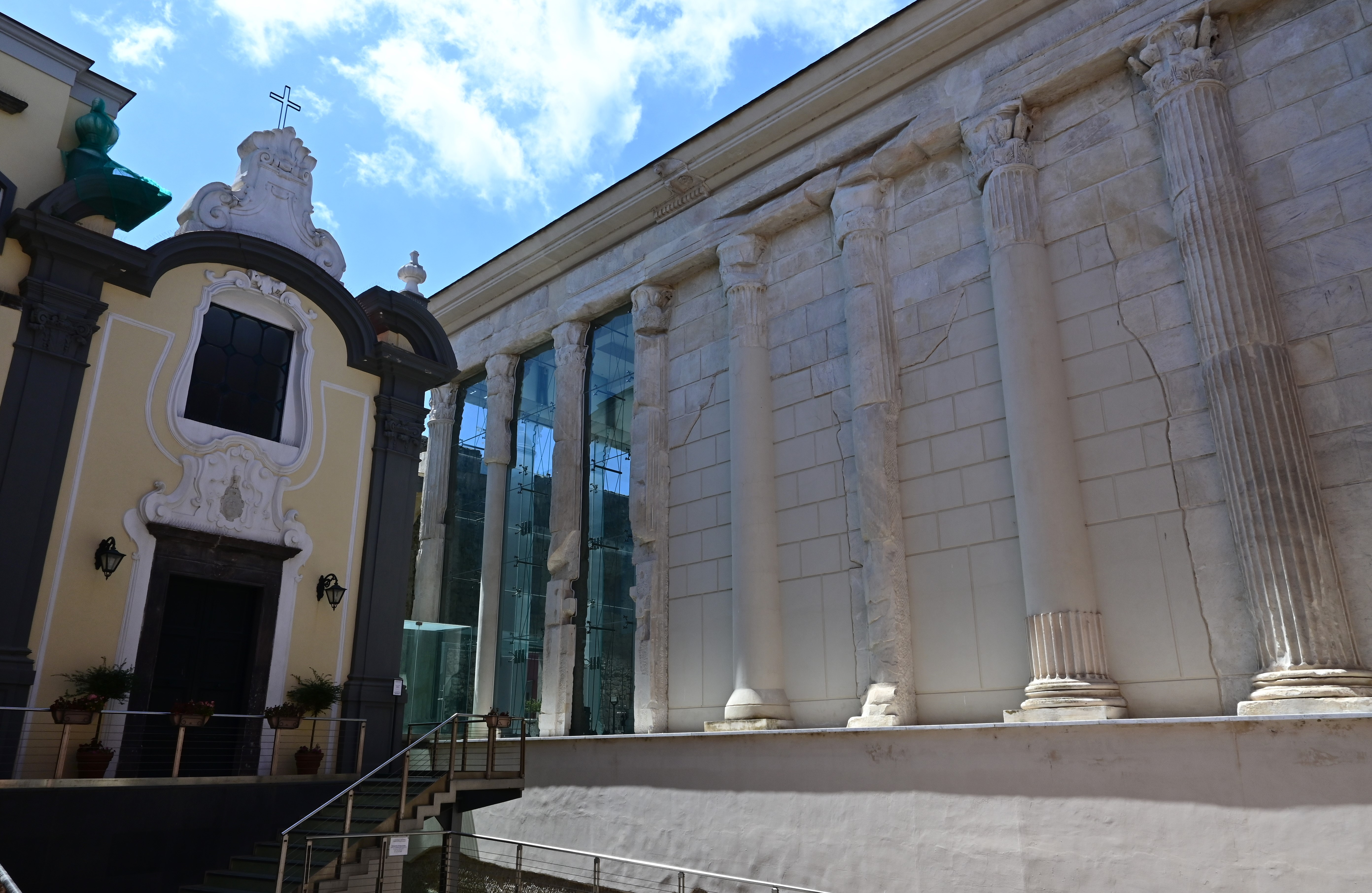
Remains of the Roman temple, side view

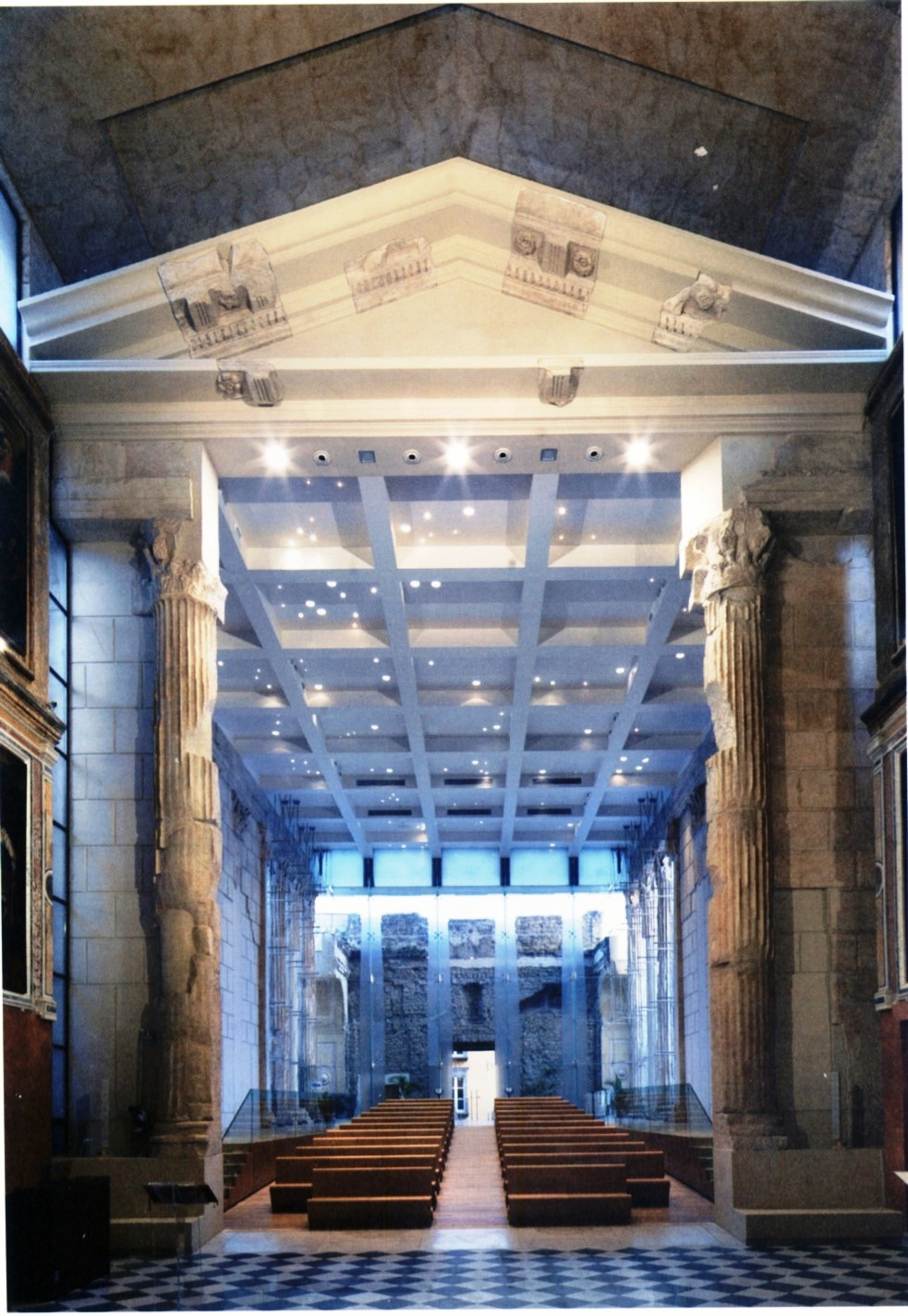
Remains of the Roman temple, rear view

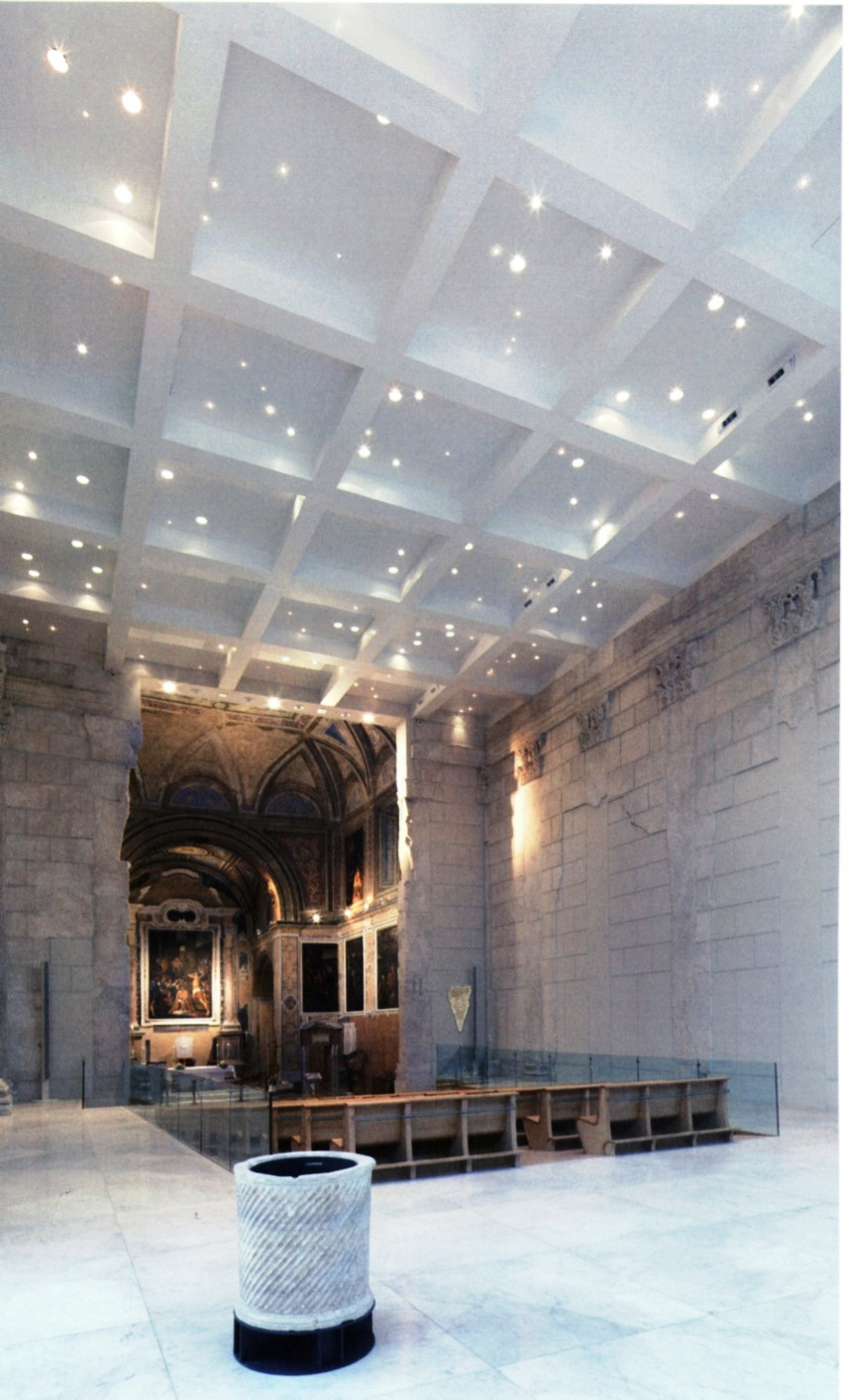
Remains of the Roman temple, interior view

Next to the church was a chapel, initially dedicated to James the Great and first built in 1354 by prince Louis of Taranto, husband of Joanna I of Naples. It had been handed over to the canons of Pozzuoli in 1363 and rededicated as 'San Giacomo Reale' in 1500, possibly to distinguish it from the nearby Cioffis chapel or from what is now Santa Maria della Consolazione. It was rebuilt following the eruption of Monte Nuovo in 1538 and entrusted to the confraternity dedicated to the Most Holy Body of Christ (Santissimo Corpo di Cristo), to which the chapel was rededicated at the same time. In 1817 it was annexed to the cathedral by bishop Carlo Maria Rosini and bishop Michele Zezza linked it to the former 12th century church of Santissima Trinità (reduced to a small chapel by various rebuilds and collapses) by knocking a hole to the right of the altar. He turned the Santissimo Corpo di Cristo chapel into a parish office. The cathedral itself was declared a national monument by a royal decree of 21 November 1940 and became a minor pontifical basilica by a bull of pope Pius XII on 25 November 1959.

The central nave was completely destroyed by a fire on the night of 16–17 May 1964. It broke out in the upper regions of the wooden ceiling which covered the vaulted ceiling and became so hot that it affected the stone walls and Roman marble. The paintings were saved and re-housed in the sacristy, the Santissimo Corpo chapel, the Capodimonte, the San Martino and other museums and galleries in Naples. Restoration work began under the museologist Ezio De Felice in 1968 and for the next forty years Santa Maria della Consolazione served as the city's cathedral, with San Paolo added as a co-cathedral in 1995. The 1633 bell-tower was demolished in 1968 after removing three of its four historic bells and has not yet been replaced.

Work was delayed by the total evacuation of the Rione Terra in 1970 due to bradyseism and poor housing conditions, by bureaucratic delays, by difficulties in raising funds and by an earthquake on 23 November 1980. Accelerated bradyseism in 1983–1984 led to the monument being totally abandoned in 1992, leading to vandalism and looting. A consortium named "Rione Terra" was formed and work resumed in 1994. Finally the Regione Campania launched an architectural competition for the restoration in July 2003. This was won by a group of architects under Marco Dezzi Bardeschi.

The entrance is through the remains of the facade and the first two chapels of the Baroque cathedral, now presented as an uncovered narthex in front of the new glass facade, engraved with the destroyed front columns of the pronaos. Inside, it has a single nave formed of the ancient cella and pronaos, with the gaps between the columns along its long sides filled with glass. The temple floor has been raised back to its original level, creating an inclined stylobate floor with benches connecting to the chancel, which is on a lower level. This also creates space to display the archaeological remains of the Republican temple's podium in the basement. A new west-facing altar has been installed in the chancel, with an episcopal chair on the site of the old altar and a new marble ambo. The early 20th century frescoes in the choir have been restored and the paintings reinstated. The former sacristy and Santissimo Sacramento chapel have resumed their previous functions, now with a new tabernacle for the reserved sacrament.

== Bibliography ==
- (in Italian) La cattedrale di Pozzuoli. Riscoperta del Rione Terra (Iniziative editoriali Quarto), curato da Giovanni Barrella.
