= Manuel de Acevedo y Zúñiga =

The Most Excellent Manuel de Acevedo y Zúñiga GE
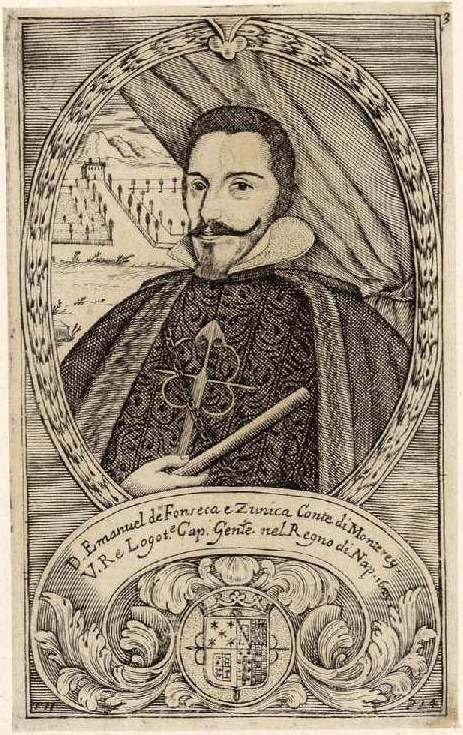
- Anonymous engraving of Manuel de Acevedo y Zúñiga in Teatro eroico, e politico de'governi de'Vicere del Regno de Napoli, by Domenico Antonio Parrino, Naples, 1692 Biblioteca Nacional de España

Personal details
- Born: 1582 or 1583 Salamanca
- Died: 22 March 1653 (aged 70–71) Madrid
- Spouse: Leonor María de Guzmán
- Parents: Gaspar de Zúñiga, 5th Count of Monterrey (father); Inés de Velasco (mother)

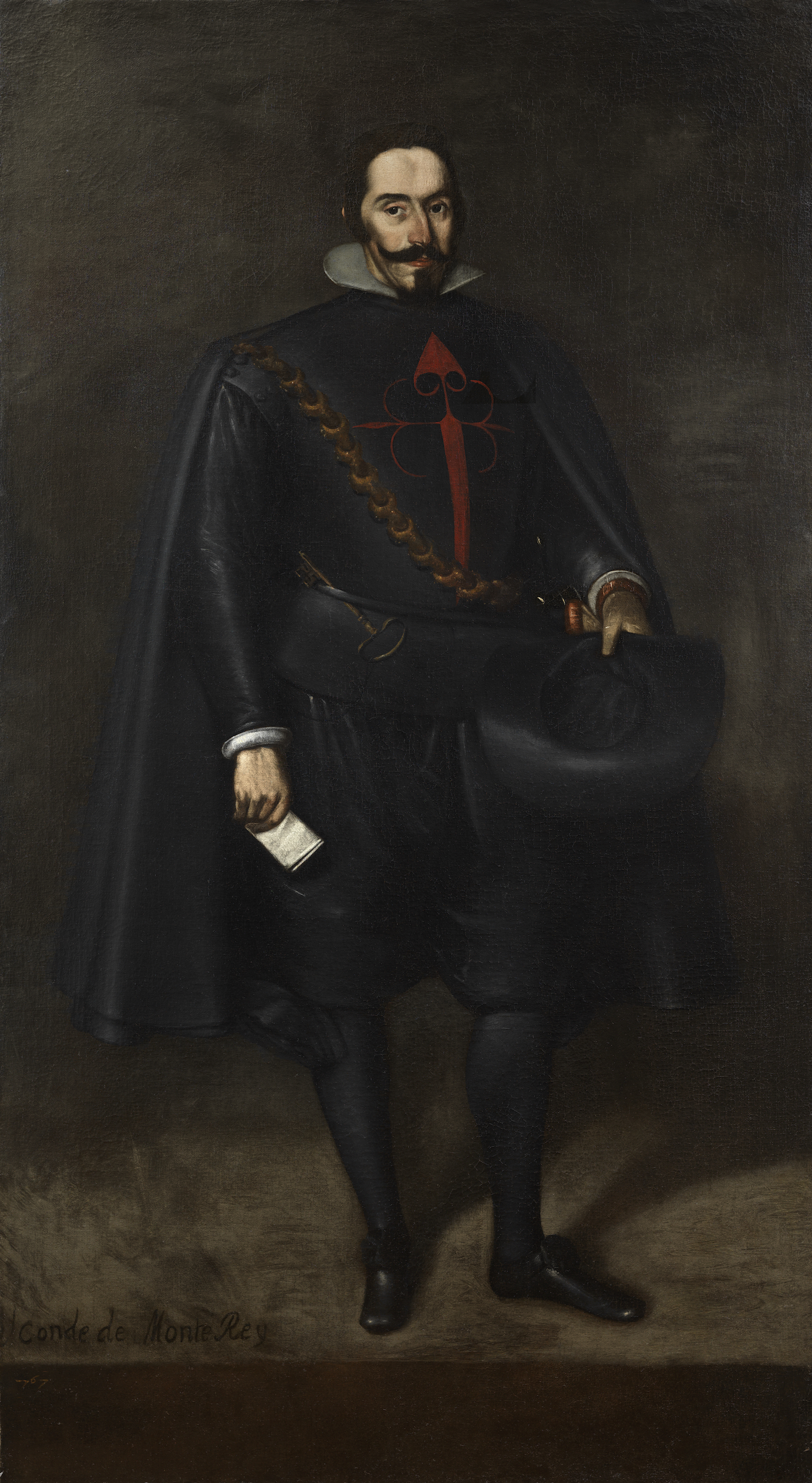
Portrait of Manuel de Acevedo y Zúñiga

Manuel de Acevedo y Zúñiga, 6th Count of Monterrey, 2nd Count of Fuentes de Valdepero (c. 1582 – 1653), was a politician and diplomat. He was Viceroy of Naples from 1631 to 1636.

== Family ==
Born in Salamanca, he was the son of Gaspar de Zúñiga, 5th Count of Monterrey, Viceroy of Mexico and of Peru and Inés de Velasco, daughter of Iñigo Fernández de Velasco, 4th Duke of Frías.

He married Leonor María de Guzmán, daughter of Enrique de Guzman y Ribera, Viceroy of Naples, and one of his sisters, Inés de Acevedo y Zúñiga married Leonor's brother, Gaspar de Guzmán y Pimentel, the Count-Duke of Olivares.

== Appointments ==
Monterrey became a Grandee in 1621, presided the Council of Italy in 1622 and was appointed ambassador to Rome in 1628.
