= The Three Philosophers =

Painting by Giorgione

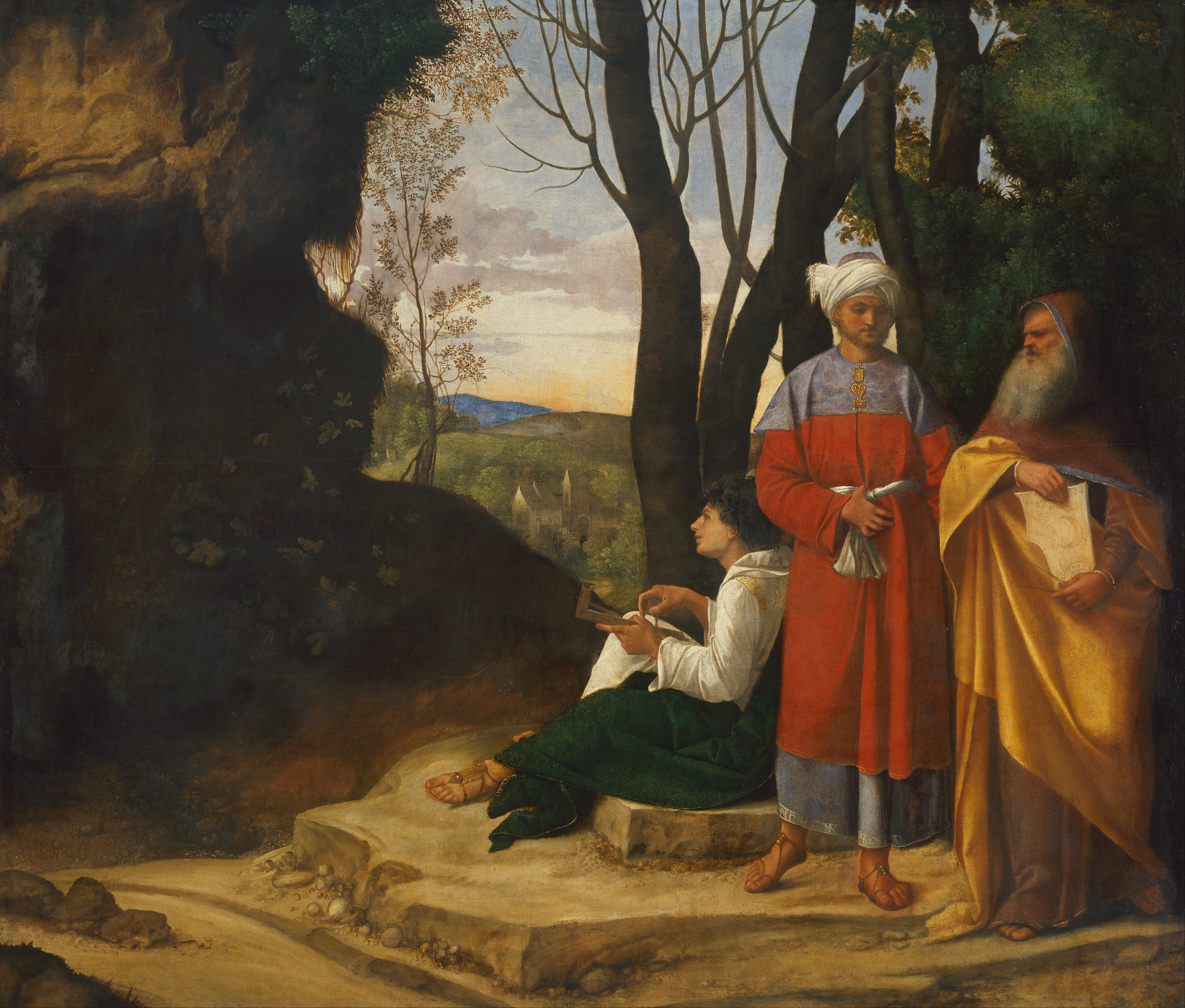
- Artist: Giorgione
- Year: c. 1505–1509
- Medium: Oil on canvas
- Dimensions: 123 cm × 144 cm (48 in × 57 in)
- Location: Kunsthistorisches Museum; Vienna

The Three Philosophers is an oil painting on canvas attributed to the Italian High Renaissance artist Giorgione. It shows three philosophers – one young, one middle-aged, and one old.

The work may have been commissioned by the Venetian noble Taddeo Contarini, a Venetian merchant with an interest in the occult and alchemy. The Three Philosophers was finished one year before the painter died. One of Giorgione’s last paintings, it is now displayed at the Kunsthistorisches Museum in Vienna.

The painting was thought to have been finished by Sebastiano del Piombo, but a "new infrared reflectogram lends no support to the theory".

== Description ==
The Three Philosophers was finished around 1509, and the current name of the work derives from a writing of Marcantonio Michiel (1484–1552), who saw it just some years after in a Venetian villa. The three figures portrayed are allegorical: an old bearded man, possibly a Greek philosopher; a Persian or Arab philosopher; and a sitting young man, enclosed within a natural landscape. In the background is a village with some mountains, the latter marked by a blue area whose meaning is unknown. The young man is observing a cave on the left of the scene, and apparently measuring it with some instruments. Since the end of the 19th century scholars and critics rejected on various grounds the earlier view that it is a representation of the three Magi gathered before Jesus' grotto.

== Interpretations ==
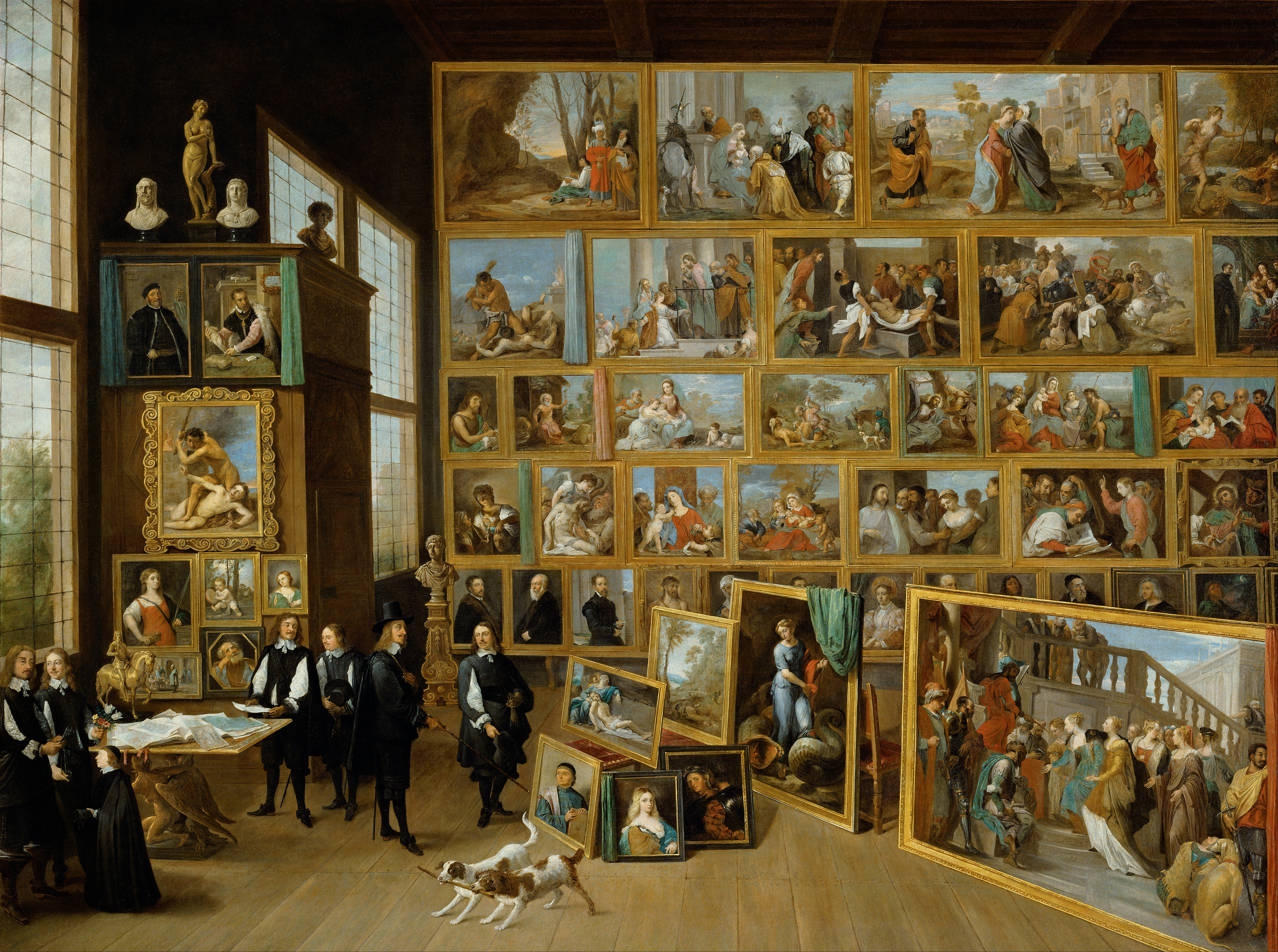
Archduke Leopold Wilhelm and the artist in the archducal picture gallery in Brussels. The painting shows rather faithfully the original painting as displayed in the dukes collection, high up left corner, by David Teniers the Younger (c. 1650, in Kunsthistorisches Museum, Vienna).

Various interpretations about Giorgione's picture have been proposed. The Three Philosophers — the old man, the Arab figure, and the young man — could depict the transmission of knowledge, the Transmission of the Classics from the ancient Greeks philosophy through the Arab translations, that became actual again around the Italian Renaissance. The old man is representing a Greek philosopher, such as Plato or Aristotle, whose writings have been copied and transmitted through the Arab philosophers to the Italian Renaissance. The Arab philosopher is possibly representing the polyhistor Avicenna or Averroes, both Arab philosophers and Arab scientists from the Islamic Golden Age.

The young man could be seen as the new Renaissance science with roots in the past, looking into the empty darkness of the cave, symbolizing the yet undiscovered secrets. The cave might also symbolize the philosophic concept of Plato's Cave. "The emphasis on light and darkness in relation to philosophy has suggested one of the most credible interpretations of the painting, originally proposed by [Peter] Meller, who argues that it represents the education of philosophers, as described in book 7 of Plato's Republic, whose famous allegory concerns the cave, the sun, and the dividing of the line".

New hypotheses about the figures, their identities and the symbolism are still currently advanced. In a note about the picture G. C. Williamsom, early in the 20th century, stated that "It represents Evander and his son Pallas showing to Aeneas the future site of Rome". The possibility that the three men are King Solomon, Hiram I, King of Tyre, and Hiram Abiff has been advanced by Neil K. MacLennan and Ross S. Kilpatrick.

It has been suggested that the figure of the young man can be inscribed neatly in a right-angled triangle for which the Pythagorean theorem applies. Karin Zeleny, relying on a reading of Polydore Vergil has proposed that the philosophers are the teachers of Pythagoras – Pherecydes of Syros and Thales. Thales has been painted as a Jew, while Pherecydes was mistakenly believed to be a Syrian. This interpretation was modified by Frank Keim who claimed that the older philosopher is in fact Aristarchus of Samos

Other scholars have asserted that the figures are typical representations for three stages of humanity (youth, middle and old age), three epochs of European civilization (Antiquity, Middle Age, Renaissance), the three Abrahamic religions or some combination of such general conceptions.

Augusto Gentili proposed that the picture illustrates the waiting for the Antichrist, based on conjunctionist astrology. On the sheet held by the oldest philosopher the word "eclipsis" and an astronomical diagram can be seen. The great conjunction of 1503 and the eclipse the same year were believed to be signs announcing its coming.

James Panero writes that, in interpreting The Three Philosophers, he is "partial to the poetic approach proposed by art historian Tom Nichols in his book Giorgione’s Ambiguity, in which he suggests that our interpretation is meant to remain free-floating and open-ended. Deliberate ambiguities, he writes, are Giorgione’s 'visual traps set to capture the viewer's curiosity and speculation.'"

== Theatrum Pictorium ==
This painting was documented in David Teniers the Younger's catalog Theatrum Pictorium of the art collection of Archduke Leopold Wilhelm in 1659 and again in 1673, but the portrait had already gained attention from Teniers' portrayals of the Archduke's art collection: Tenier's copies that he made of the exhibits have long been recognised as a valuable historical resource.

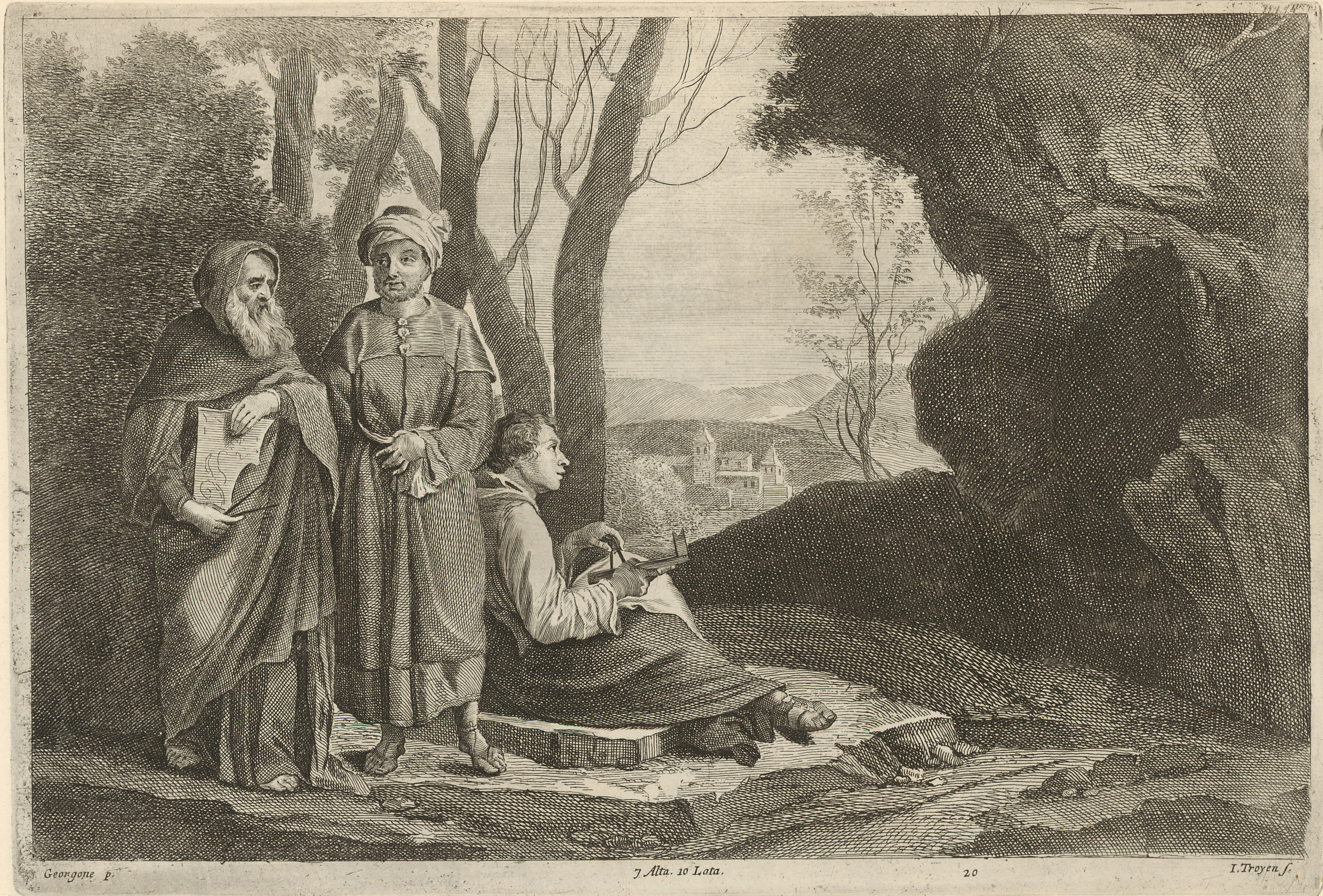
1673 engraving from Teniers' catalog, by Jan van Troyen

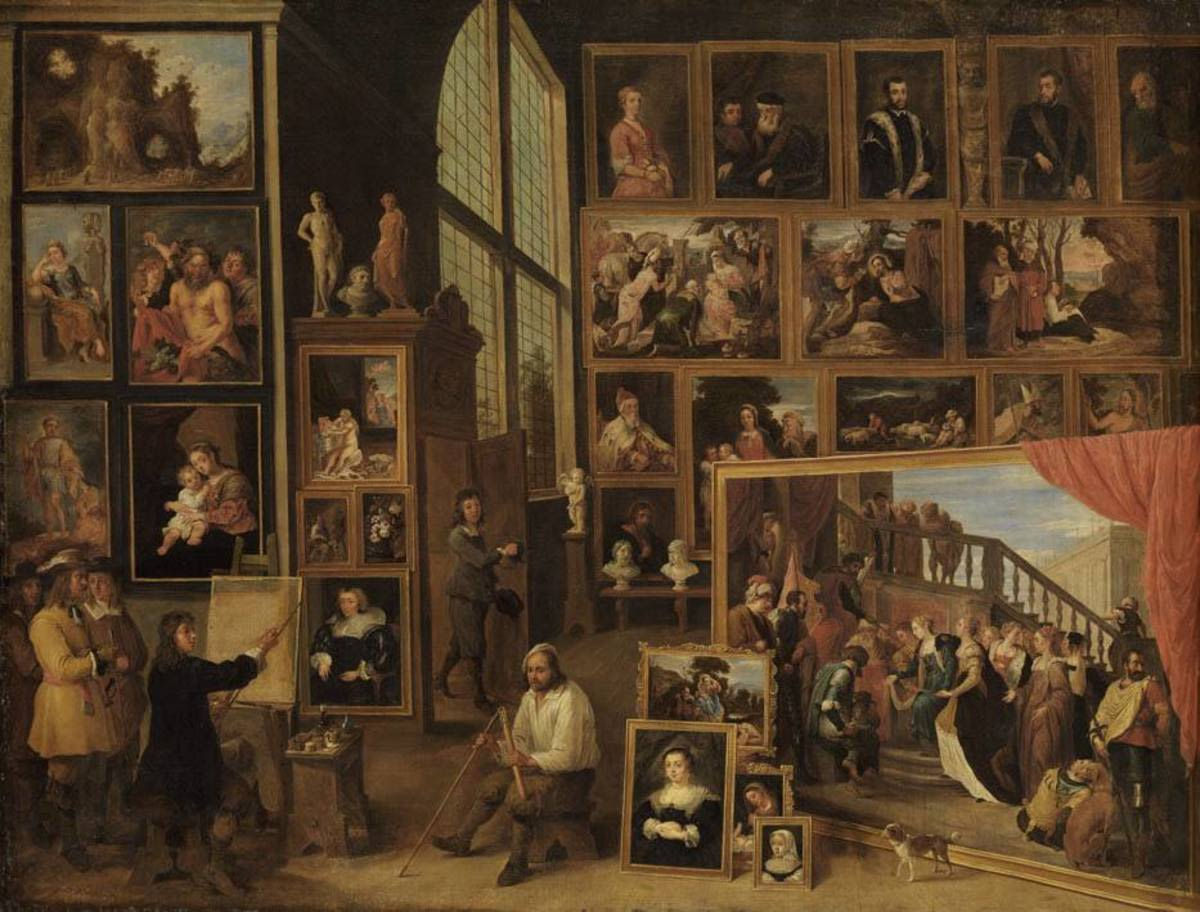

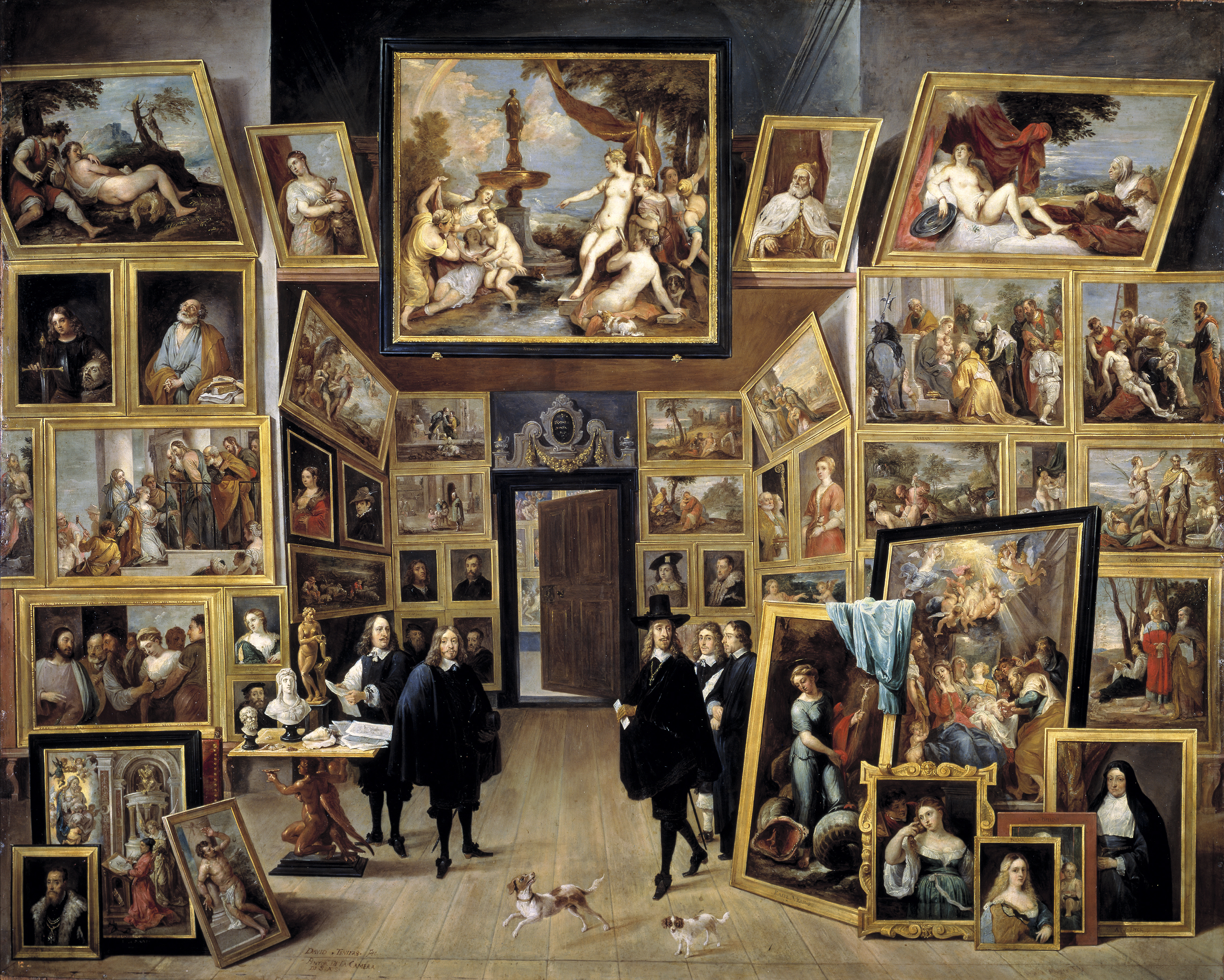
1650

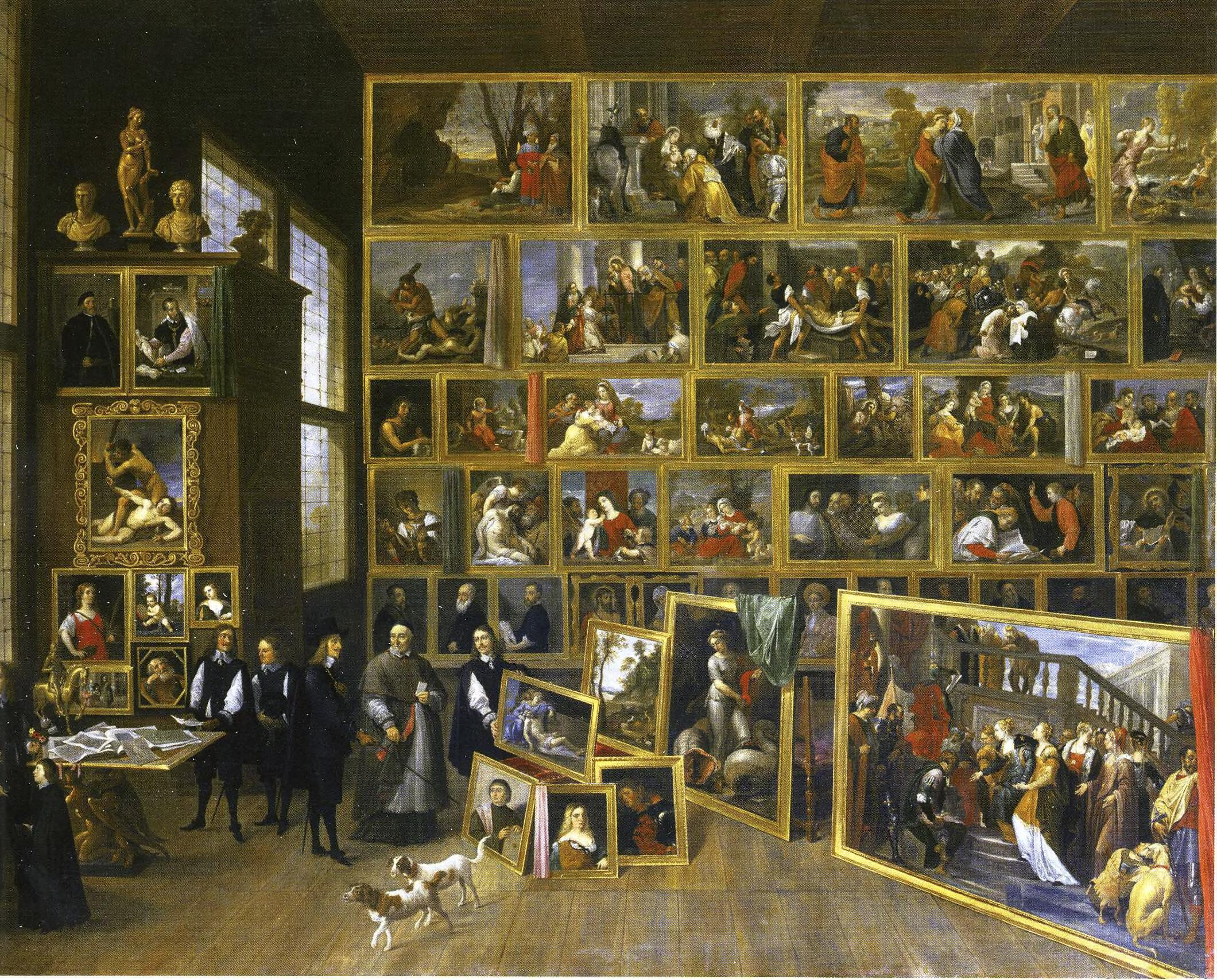
Gallery of Archduke Leopold Wilhelm in Brussels (Petworth), 1651

This painting is displayed at the Kunsthistorisches Museum in Vienna. While working on his picture, David Teniers the Younger made tiny separate copies of each and every picture as a study for the final big painting, depicting the duke's collection. It is a small copy that measures 21.5 x 30.9 cm.
