= Giustiniani Portrait =

Painting attributed to Giorgione

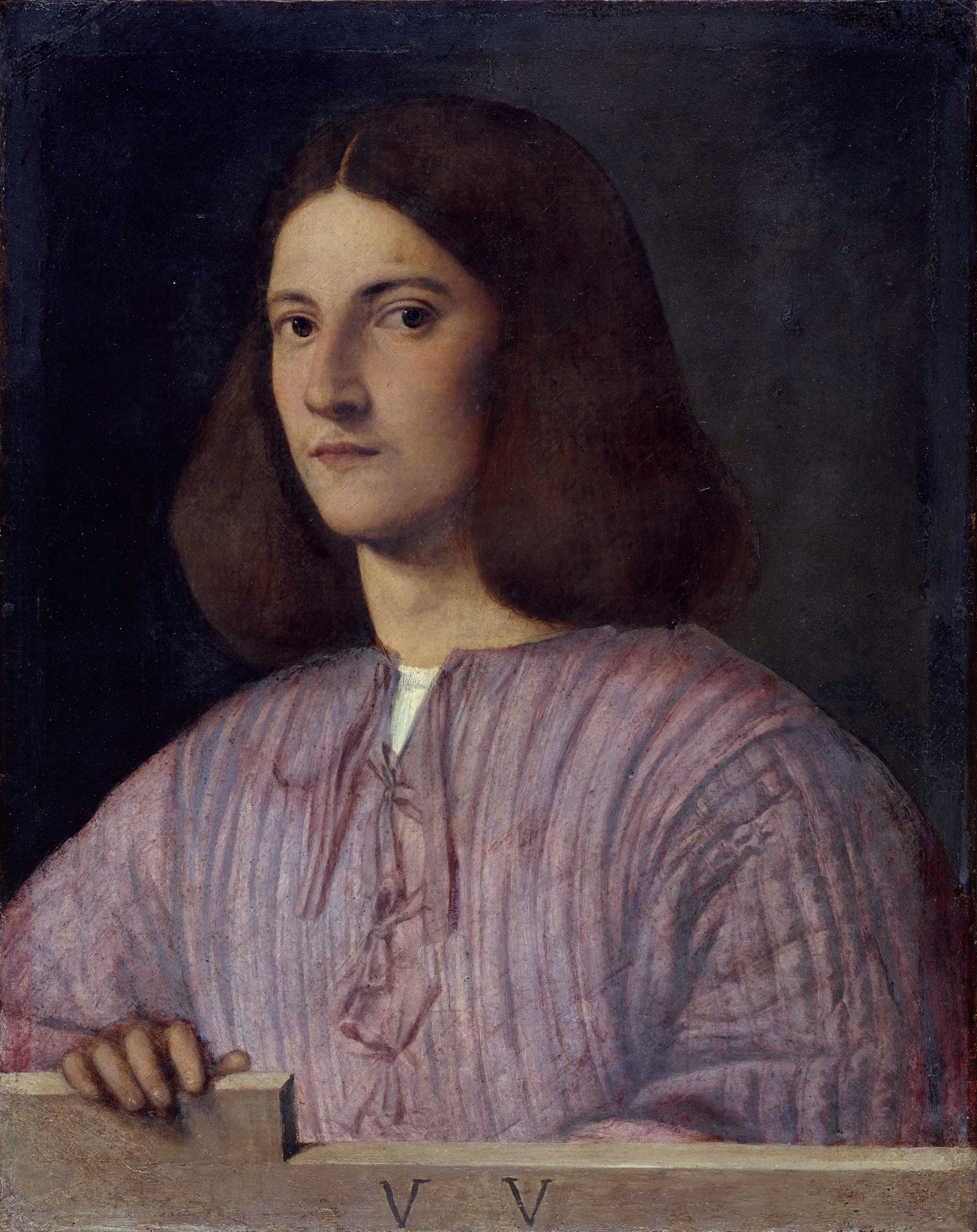
Giustinani Portrait (c. 1503–1504) attributed to Giorgione

The Giustiniani Portrait or Portrait of a Young Man is a painting, usually dated to approximately 1503. The work is frequently, but not universally, attributed to Giorgione, and it is now in the Gemäldegalerie, Berlin.

Prior to 1884, the painting was part of the Giustiniani Collection in Padua, Italy. Between 1884 and 1891, it was in the possession of the art historian Jean Paul Richter. He in turn sold the work in 1891 to Wilhelm von Bode, through whom it came to be part of the collections of the Staatliche Museen zu Berlin (Berlin State Museums).

== Bibliography ==
- Alessandra Fregolent, Giorgione, Electa, Milano 2001. ISBN 88-8310-184-7
