= The Old Woman (Giorgione) =

1506 painting by Giorgione

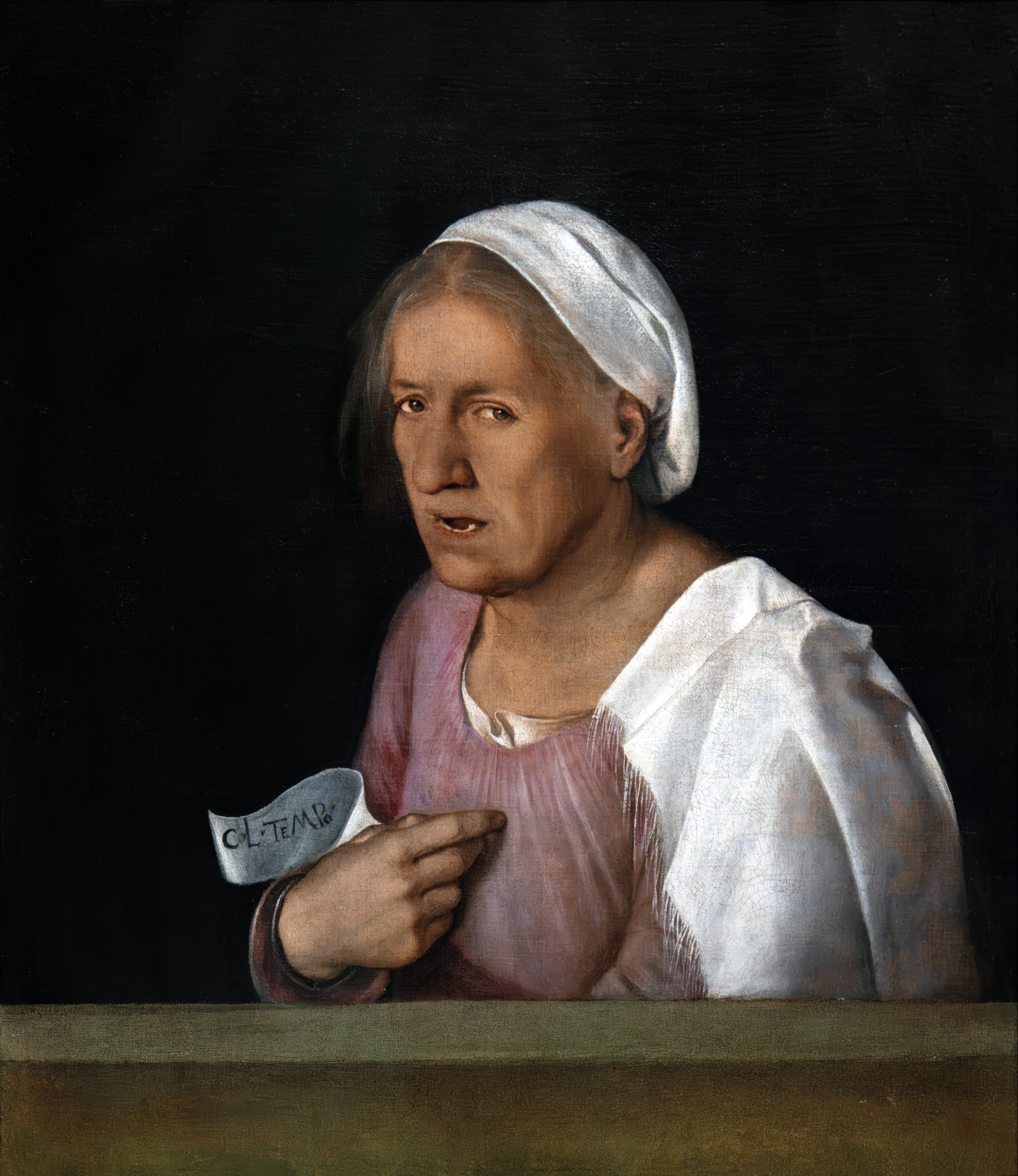

The Old Woman is a 1506 oil on canvas painting by Giorgione, still in its original frame and now in the Gallerie dell'Accademia in Venice.

== History ==
An allegory of old age and passing time, the woman is shown three-quarter length behind a parapet, with her mouth open to speak, possibly the words on the small scroll in her hand "With Time". Some art historians have linked it to Albrecht Dürer's 1507 Avarice, produced during the German artist's second trip to Venice. If Dürer's work was the prototype for Tintoretto's, the latter would probably have to be re-dated to 1508.

A 1569 inventory states the work shows "Giorgione's mother, by Giorgione". It may have been seen by Michelangelo during the latter's trip to Venice and influenced the Sibyls in his Sistine Chapel ceiling.

== Bibliography ==
- (in Italian) Alessandra Fregolent, Giorgione, Electa, Milan, 2001. ISBN 88-8310-184-7
- (in Italian) Pierluigi De Vecchi et Elda Cerchiari, Le temps de l'art, volume 2, Bompiani, Milano, 1999. ISBN 88-451-7212-0
