= Portrait of a Young Man (Giorgione, Budapest) =

Painting attributed to Giorgione

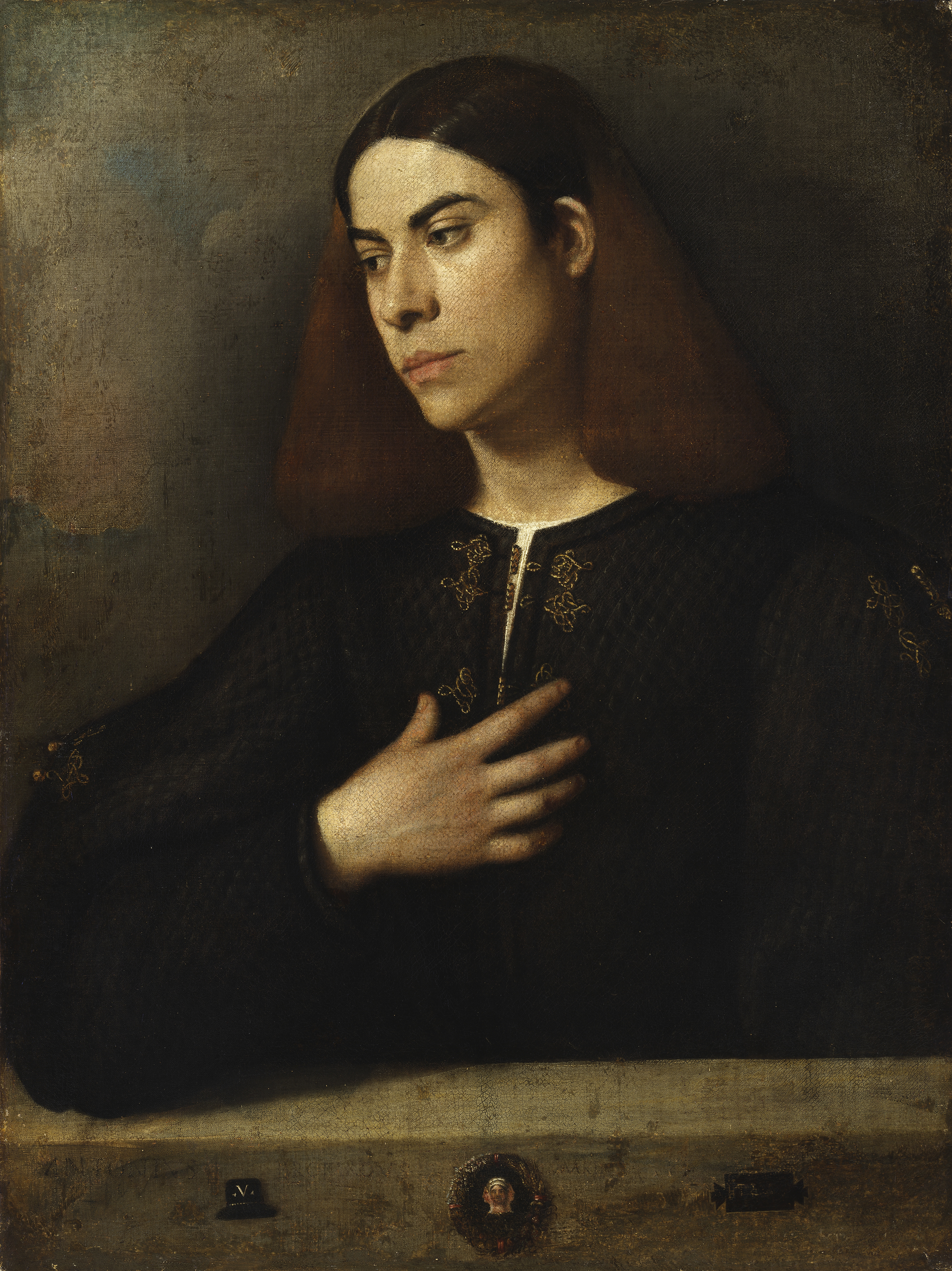
Portrait of a Young Man (c. 1508-1510) attributed to Giorgione

Portrait of a Young Man or Portrait of a Youth is a c.1508-1510 painting, attributed to Giorgione and now in the Museum of Fine Arts in Budapest. Some have instead attributed it to Giorgione's collaborator Giovanni Cariani.

The work was produced late in the artist's career, with the parapet and dark background showing the influence of Flemish models. The parapet bears the inscription "V" on a shield, possibly a symbol of the Latin word "virtus", meaning virtue or courage, and an ancient Roman cameo with a triple female head and a tiny cartouche with a near-illegible inscription. Some thus identify the work's subject as the poet Antonio Broccardo.
