= Judith (Giorgione) =

Painting by Giorgione

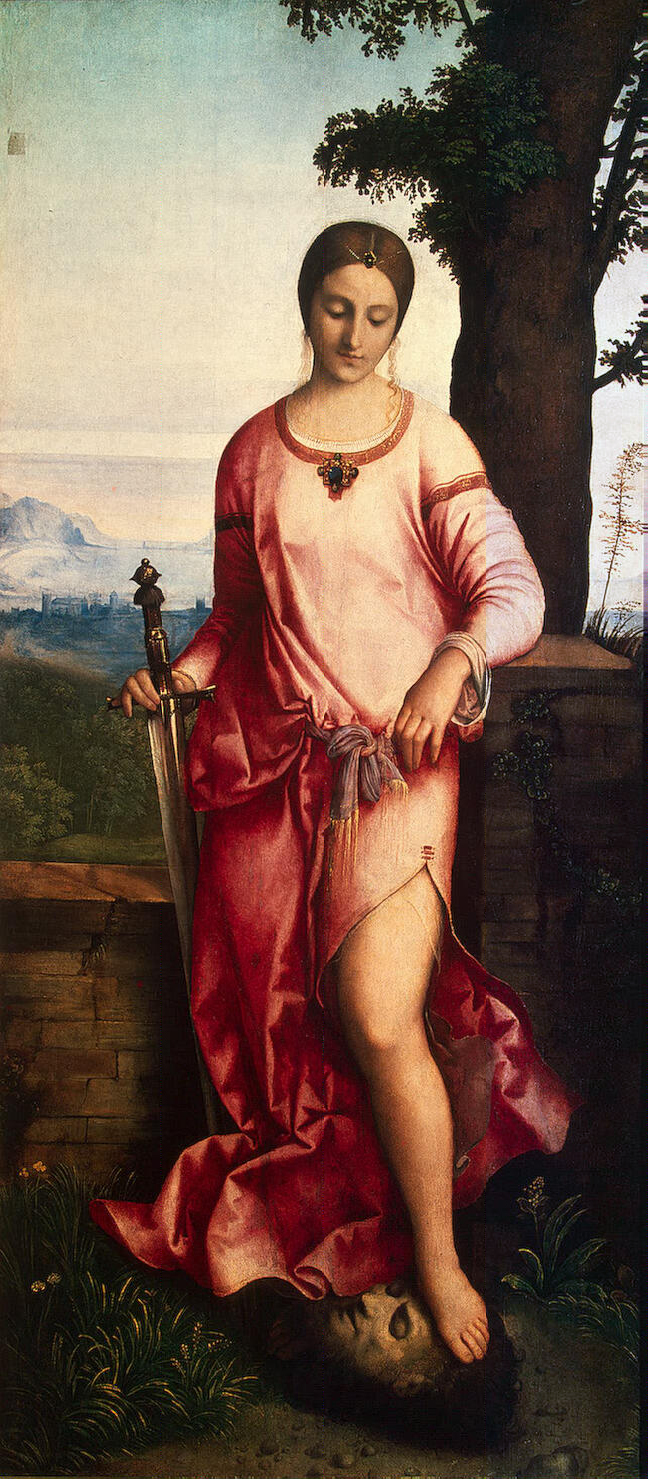
- Artist: Giorgione
- Year: circa 1504
- Type: Oil on canvas (transferred from panel)
- Dimensions: 144 cm × 66.5 cm (57 in × 26.2 in)
- Location: Hermitage, Saint Petersburg

Judith is a painting by the Italian painter Giorgione, executed around 1504. It is one of the few authentic works by Giorgione owned by the Russian Hermitage Museum. The painting, originally attributed to Raphael, came to the Hermitage in 1772 from Paris. Like many other paintings, it refers to the Judith and Holofernes motif.

== Restoration works ==
In the late 19th century, a thick layer of dark yellow varnish covered Judith, which completely distorted the original painting; in addition, restorations conducted at different times had falsified the artist's intentions. In 1839 the Hermitage restorer A. Sidorov accurately transferred the painting from panel to canvas. In 1967 it was decided to clean it, and the task was entrusted to A.M. Malova, a highly qualified restorer under the supervision of A.V. Brianzev, head of the easel paintings restoration workshop. General control consisted of experts from Leningrad and Moscow.

The painting was first thoroughly studied with UV rays and binocular microscope. UV and infrared images were taken, as well as X-rays. The examination showed that most of the damage was on the grass, ground and trunk. The old repaints covered broader areas than was necessary to restore the inflicted areas. The varnish was removed with a cotton tampon wetted in a special solution; other additional material was cleaned out using a very sharp scalpel under a microscope. Between two and six cm^{2} of original painting was restored per day.

The restoration was finished in 1971. The paints became bright and deep, and a tower and hilly landscape on the background were revealed.
