= Adoration of the Shepherds (Giorgione) =

Painting by Giorgione

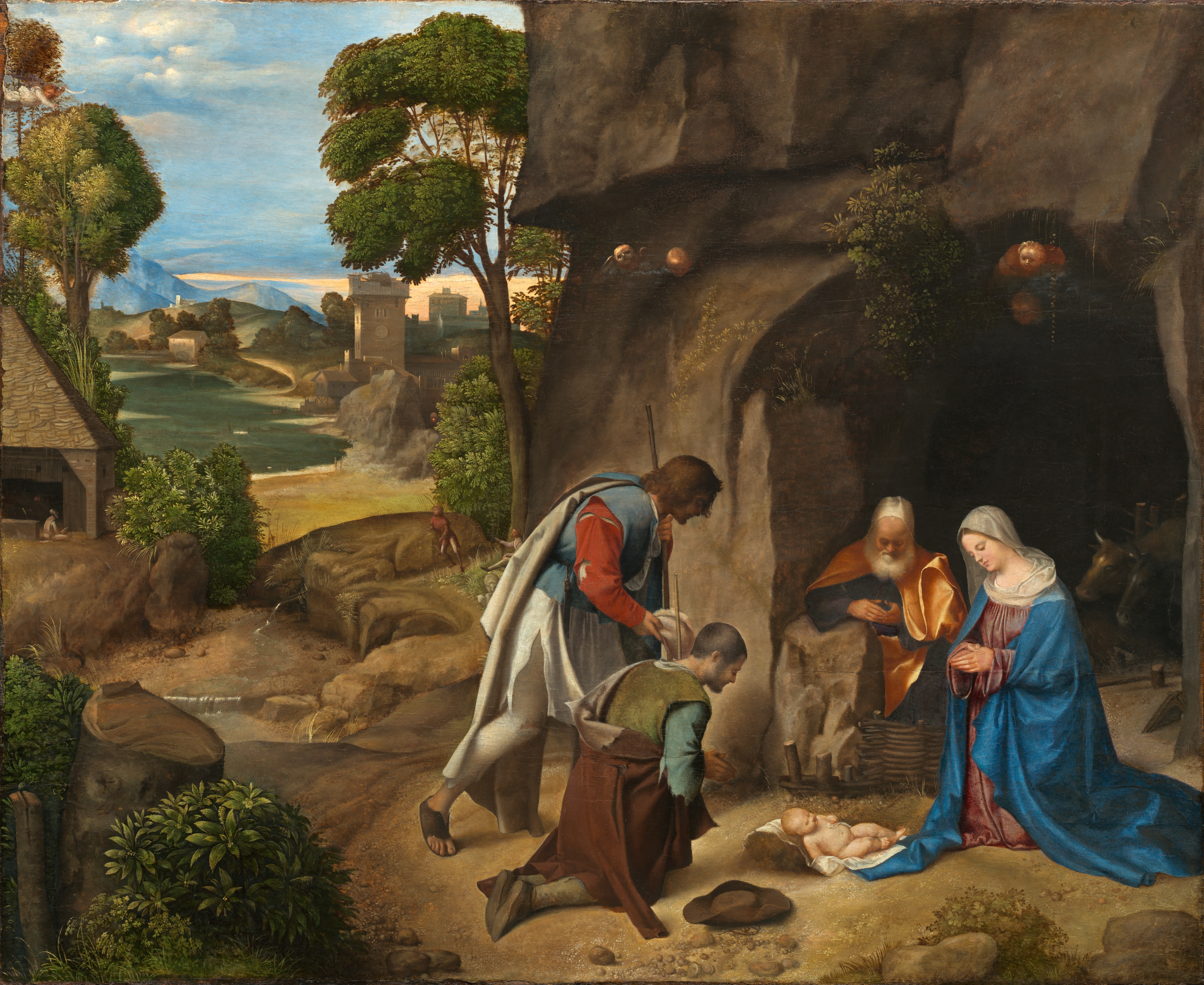
- Artist: Giorgione
- Year: ca. 1505 to 1510
- Medium: oil on panel
- Subject: Adoration of the Shepherds
- Dimensions: 90.8 cm × 110.5 cm (35.7 in × 43.5 in)
- Location: National Gallery of Art; Washington, D.C.
- Owner: National Gallery of Art
- Accession: 1939.1.289
- Website: www.nga.gov/content/ngaweb/Collection/art-object-page.432.html

The Adoration of the Shepherds, sometimes still known as the Allendale Nativity, after a former owner, is a painting by the Italian Renaissance painter Giorgione, completed in about 1505 to 1510. The attribution is now usual, although not universal; the usual other view is that it is an early Titian. It is certainly a Venetian painting of that period. It is displayed in the National Gallery of Art of Washington, D.C., United States.

A group of paintings is sometimes described as the "Allendale group", after the Allendale Nativity. This group includes another Washington painting, the Holy Family, and an Adoration of the Magi predella panel in the National Gallery, London. This group, now often expanded to include another Adoration of the Shepherds in Vienna, and sometimes further, are usually included (increasingly) or excluded together from Giorgione's oeuvre.

== Composition ==
Giorgione portrayed the main scene on the right, in front of a dark grotto, while on the left is bright landscape crowned by trees. A sincere dramatic tension is obtained by the choice to place the kneeling shepherd pilgrims in the centre of the painting. The entire group of parents, child, and pilgrims form an anchored rectangle that forms a counterpoised focal point to the receding landscape on the left. A "diminutive angel [is] among the branches in the upper left".

== Provenance ==
This work was probably completed by Giorgione while he was part of the workshop of Vincenzo Catena, a strict follower of Giovanni Bellini's style. (Note: Dates given to the painting have varied; the National Gallery claims between 1505 and 1510".)

It was owned by Cardinal Joseph Fesch (1763–1839) and sold at the Palazzo Ricci, Rome on 18 March 1845 (lot 874) as Adoration des bergers by "Giorgon (Giorgio Barbarelli dit le)" for 1,760 scudi (£370.53 at a rate of 4.75 scudi to the pound). The Cardinal was an uncle of Napoleon and a collector of gargantuan proportions. The sale of 17 and 18 March featured 1,837 pictures; the Louvre had 1,406 at the time. The collection included Fra Angelico's Last Judgement and Poussin's A Dance to the Music of Time.

It was next owned by Claudius Tarral of Paris and sold at his sale at Christie's, London on 11 June 1847 (lot 55) as Adoration of the Shepherds by Giorgione. The sale featured 55 pictures and fetched £3,383. The Giorgione sold for 1,470 guineas (£1,544). This large sum relative to the sale total and the fact that it was the last lot cried indicates that it was the premier item of the sale.

It was at the 1847 sale that the painting came into the ownership of Thomas Wentworth Beaumont (1792–1848) of Bretton Hall, West Yorkshire, England. From him it passed to Wentworth Beaumont, 1st Baron Allendale (1829-1907), to his son, Wentworth Beaumont, 1st Viscount Allendale [1860-1923] and to his son, Wentworth Beaumont, 2nd Viscount Allendale (1890-1956).

Joseph Duveen concluded negotiations to acquire the Nativity from Lord Allendale on 5 August 1937. (Note: In the Duveen Brothers General Stock Book for the period 1 June 1937 to April 1941, it is annotated "Purchased Aug. 3, 1937".) It was acquired by Duveen Brothers at, according to Duveen's colleague Edward Fowles, "a Giorgione price" ($315,000 and $5,000 to dealer Charles Ruck). Duveen's expert, art historian Bernard Berenson fervently believed the painting to be early Titian, and a battle of wills ensued. The Allendale Nativity ultimately caused the rupture between Lord Duveen and Berenson, ending one of the most influential relationships in modern art history. (Note: The naming of the painting is the main plot in the play The Old Masters (play).) Duveen sold the painting, as a Giorgione, to Samuel Henry Kress, the department-store magnate, for $400,000 in 1938. He displayed the Nativity in the window of his store on Fifth Avenue during the Christmas season of that year.

== Attribution ==
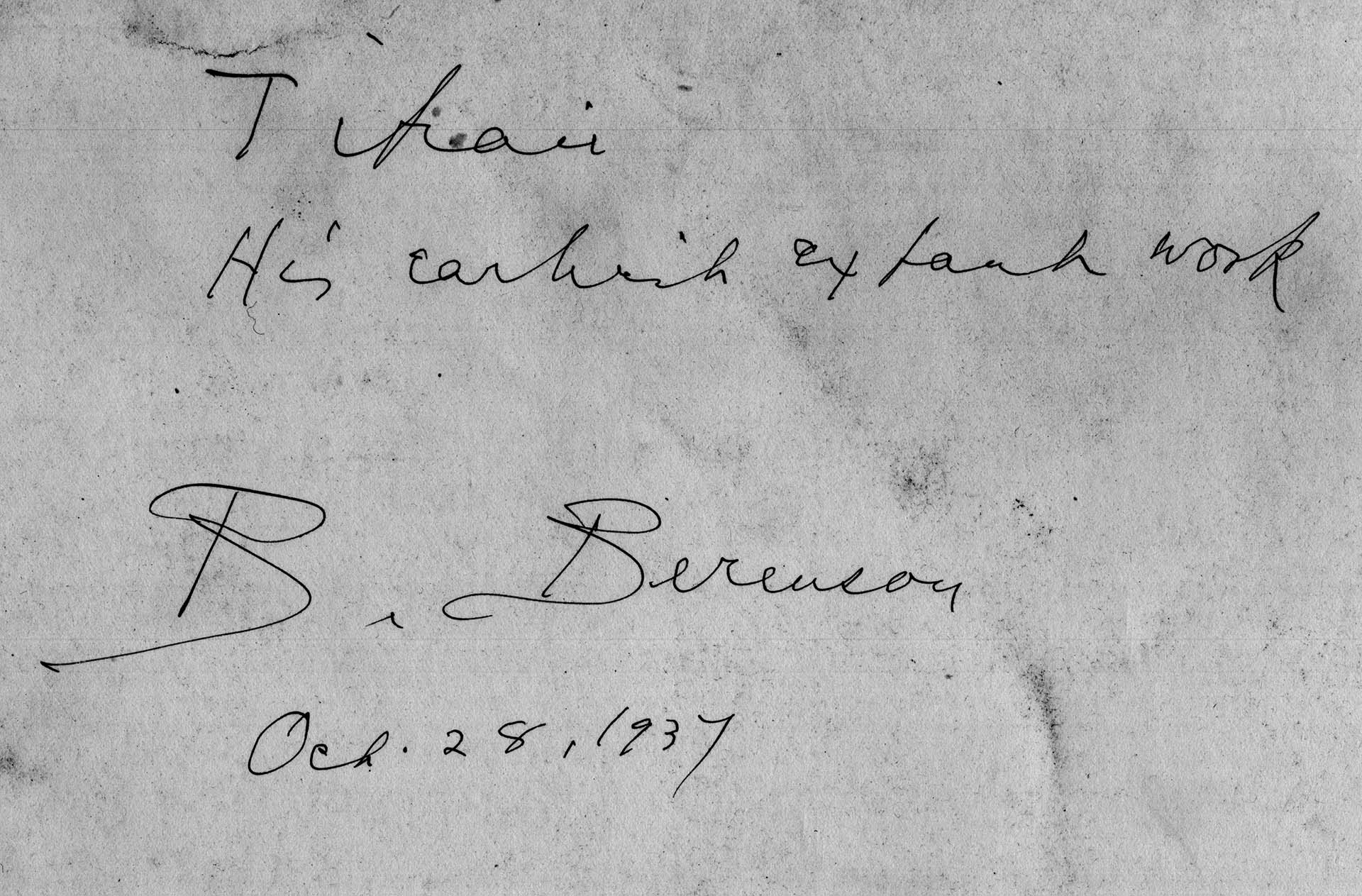
Back of a photograph of the Allendale Nativity where Berenson notes his opinion of the painting as by Titian, October 28, 1937, © Kress Collection of Historic Images, Department of Image Collections, National Gallery of Art Library, Washington, DC

Joseph Archer Crowe and Giovanni Battista Cavalcaselle concluded as early as 1871 that the painting was by Giorgione. Berenson's Venetian Painters (1894) tentatively attributes the painting to Vincenzo Catena. In 1912 Roger Fry wrote that "examination of the forms, particularly of the landscape and the foliage in the foreground leaves little doubt in my mind that it is by Cariani." In 1937 Berenson wrote "it must be Titian's, perhaps his earliest work, but only half out of the egg, the other half still in the Giorgionesque formula". He reiterated this opinion on the back of a photograph in 1937, "Titian, His earliest extant work."

In Berenson's 1957 list of the "Venetian School" the painting is attributed in part to Giorgione with "Virgin and Landscape probably finished by Titian". In the 1979 Shapley catalogue of the National Gallery of Art the painting is given as Giorgione with five dissenters, including Ellis Waterhouse and Sydney Joseph Freedberg.
