= Marcantonio Michiel =

Venetian noble

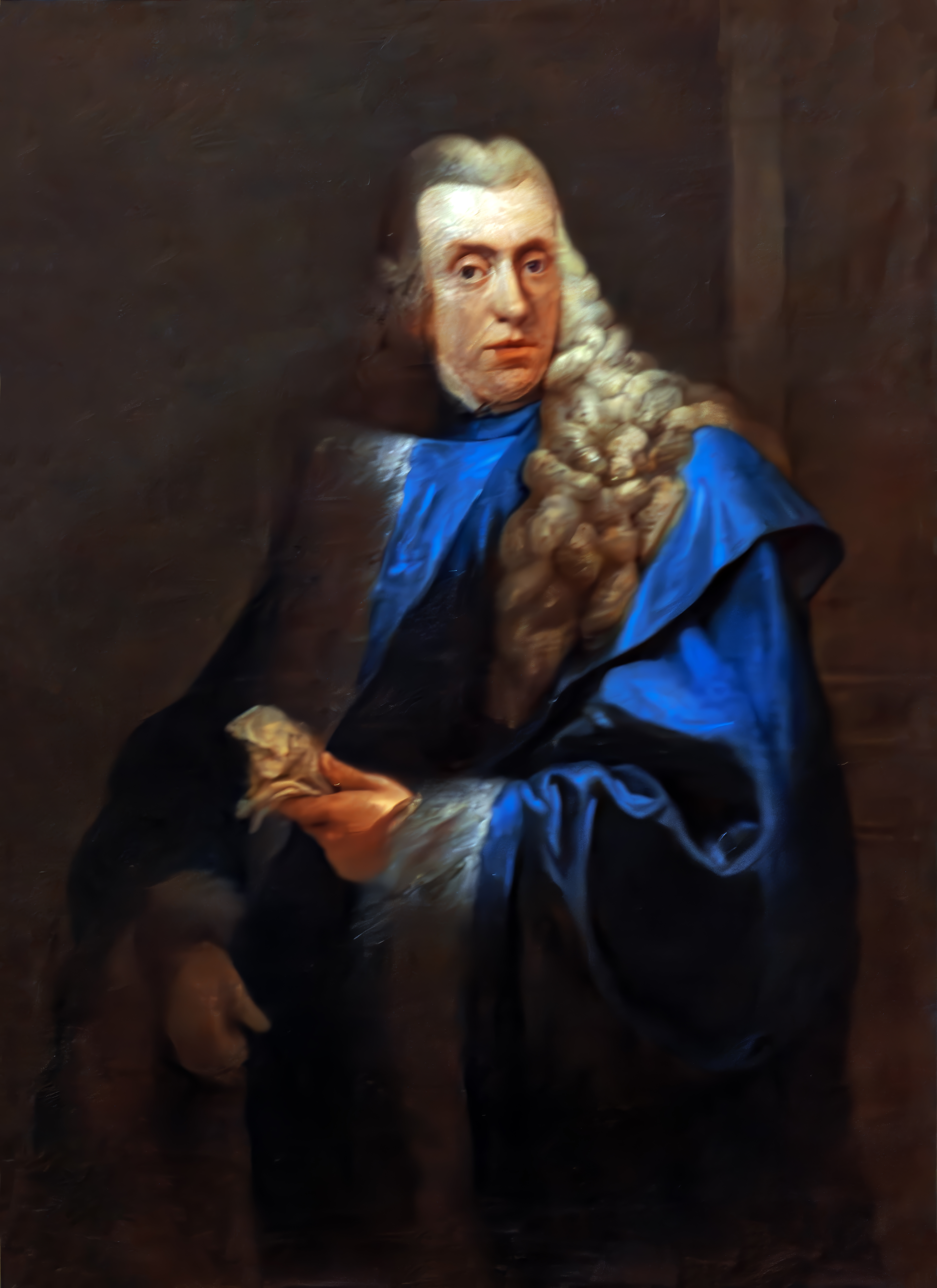
Marcantonio Michiel Museo Correr

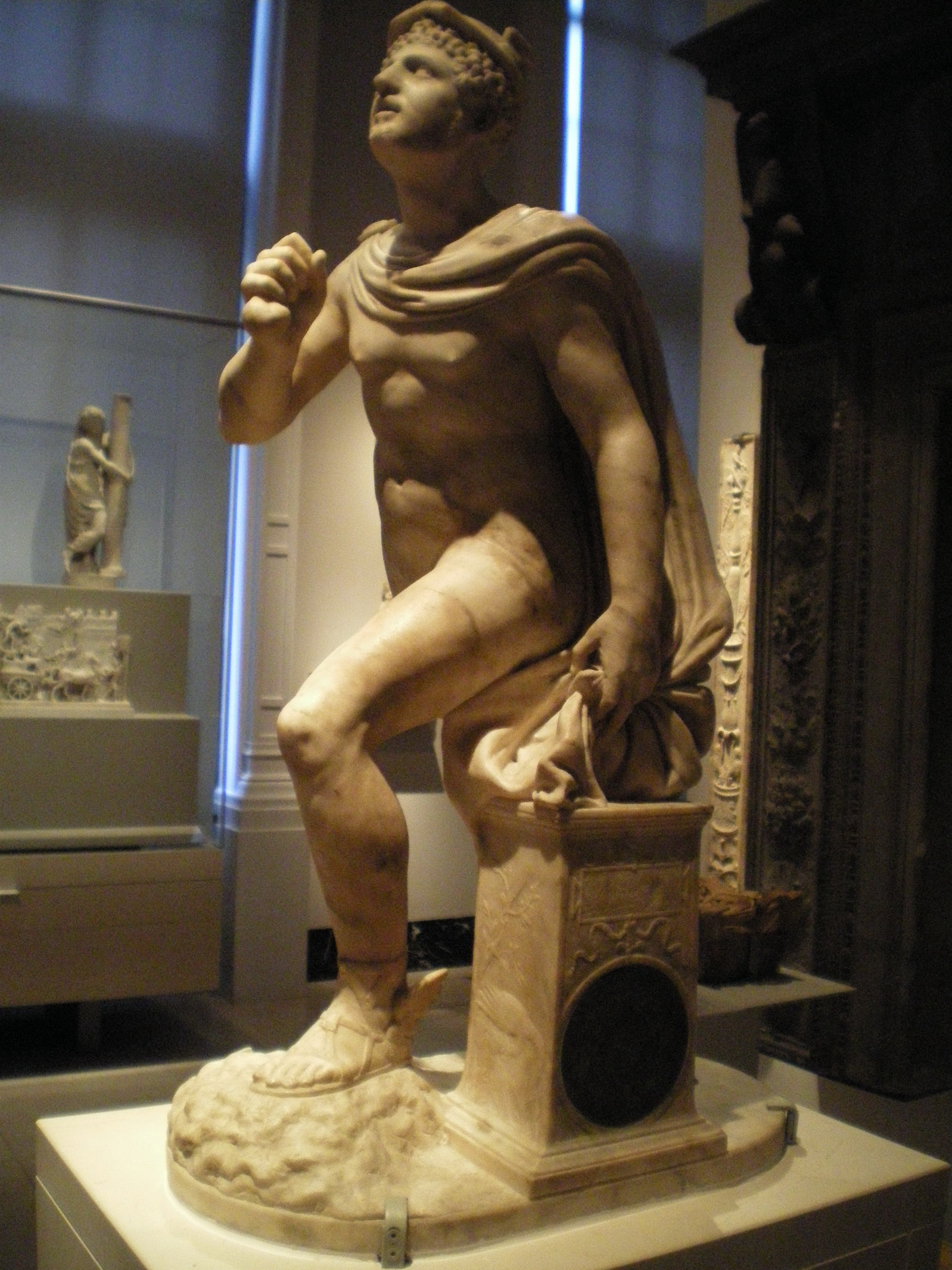
Mercury, with auspicious horoscope, commissioned by Michiel from Antonio Minelli, 1527 (Victoria and Albert Museum)

Marcantonio Michiel (1484–1552) was a Venetian noble from a family prominent in the service of the state who was interested in matters of art. His notes on the contemporary art collections of Venice, Padua, Milan and other northern Italian centres (Notizie d'opere del disegno), written sporadically between 1521 and 1543 and preserved in the Biblioteca Marciana, provide a major primary source for art historians and a less thoroughly inspected source for historians of décor.

Michiel never worked up his notes into a publishable itinerary of art collections; "his publication record is poor and mainly posthumous," Jennifer Fletcher has noted, "and letters from friends hint at a certain lack of perseverance." His diary was never intended to be read by the public, and his history of Venice was an endless project. Pietro Aretino wrote him a flattering letter praising his interests in painting, architecture and poetry. Iconography was his weak point: though his Latin was excellent, his knowledge of the Bible was desultory, and Jennifer Fletcher notes that no one ever took particular notice of his piety.

He was comfortably well off, but not rich. He lived in the modest Ca' Michiel on a side canal and married the beautiful Maffea from the Soranzo family, built a villa, raised five sons and lived a private family life. In his youth he followed his father to Bergamo when the elder Michiel was appointed Capitano, and he spent two years in Rome at the court of Pope Leo X, as a member of the familia of Cardinal Pisani. His peers apparently did not want to entrust him with ambassadorial duties in spite of his rank and connections, and it is as a collector and connoisseur that he is remembered.

== Notes ==
- Notizia d'opere di disegno..., his notes compiled by J. Morelli, Bassano, 1800 on Google books
