= Judith Slaying Holofernes (Artemisia Gentileschi, Florence) =

Painting by Artemisia Gentileschi

Judith Beheading Holofernes
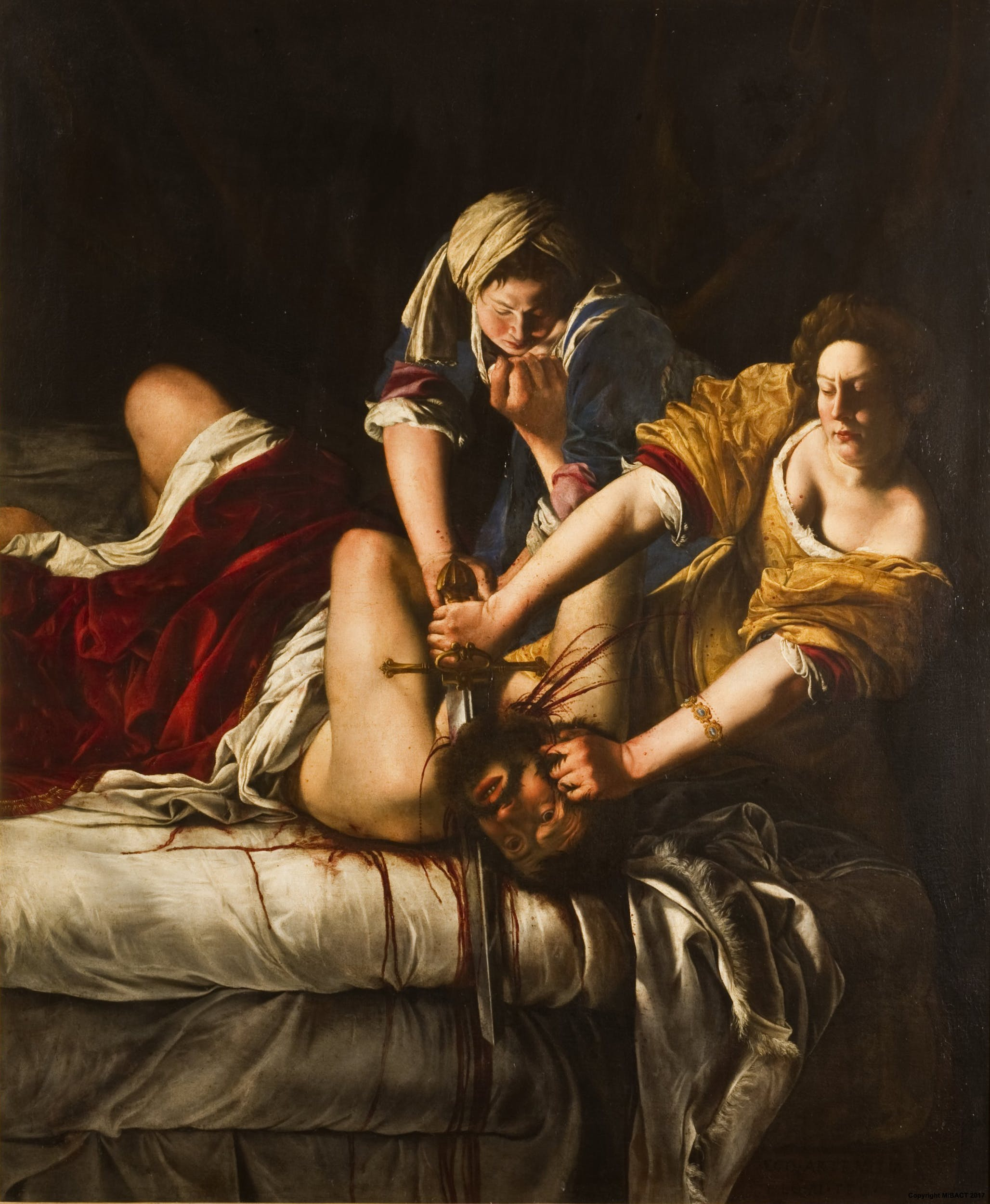
- Artist: Artemisia Gentileschi
- Year: c. 1620
- Medium: Oil on canvas
- Dimensions: 6′ 6″ x 5′ 4″
- Location: Uffizi, Florence

Judith Beheading Holofernes c. 1620, now at the Uffizi Gallery in Florence, is the renowned painting by Baroque artist Artemisia Gentileschi depicting the assassination of Holofernes from the deuterocanonical Book of Judith. When compared to her earlier interpretation from Naples c. 1612, there are subtle but marked improvements to the composition and detailed elements of the work. These differences display the skill of a cultivated Baroque painter, with the adept use of chiaroscuro and realism to express the violent tension between Judith, Abra, and the dying Holofernes.

== Description ==
Gentileschi centers her work on the labor of the killing, which forces the gaze to start amid the tangle of blood, limbs, and metal. Her ability to display brutal realism is shown particularly in the details, such as the arc of carotid blood that spatters across the frame. This scene displays the use of chiaroscuro, or the drastic contrast between light and dark, both literally and figuratively.

Holofernes struggles in vain to press against Abra as the two women force him down with distinctly strong arms. Their sleeves are rolled up, as though they are performing an unavoidable domestic chore, and their faces express a staunch resolve. Judith drives the sword, which is noticeably vertical and shaped in a way that alludes to a cross, into flesh with an exertive force. Abra is depicted as almost a mirror to Judith, with a youthful appearance that departs from earlier portrayals of her character. She holds firm to the left arm of their victim as he pushes against her breast in desperation. Holofernes, whose blood puddles and spurts a deep red to contrast the white sheets of his deathbed, is overpowered and without hope.

== Subject ==
Judith and her maidservant by Artemisia Gentileschi
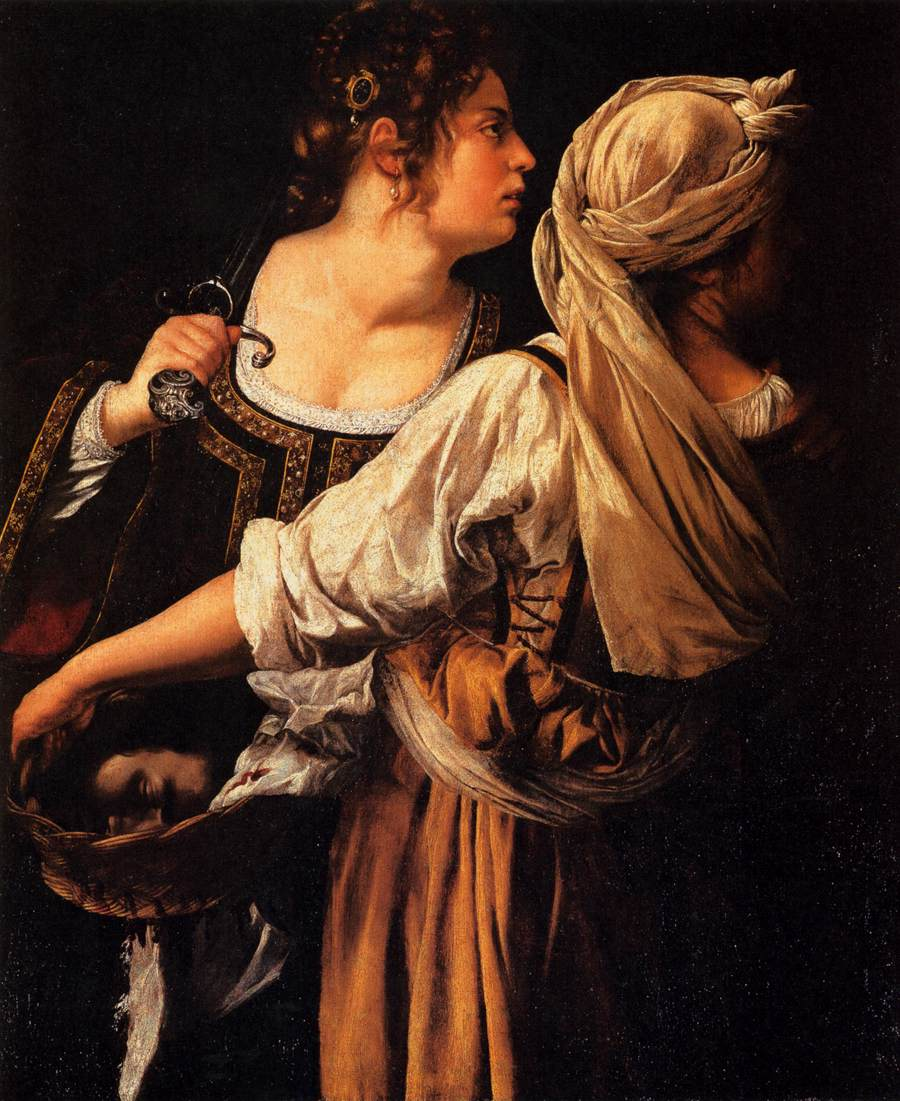
Artemisia Gentileschi, Judith and her Maidservant, c. 1618, oil on canvas. Galleria Palatina, Palazzo Pitti, Florence

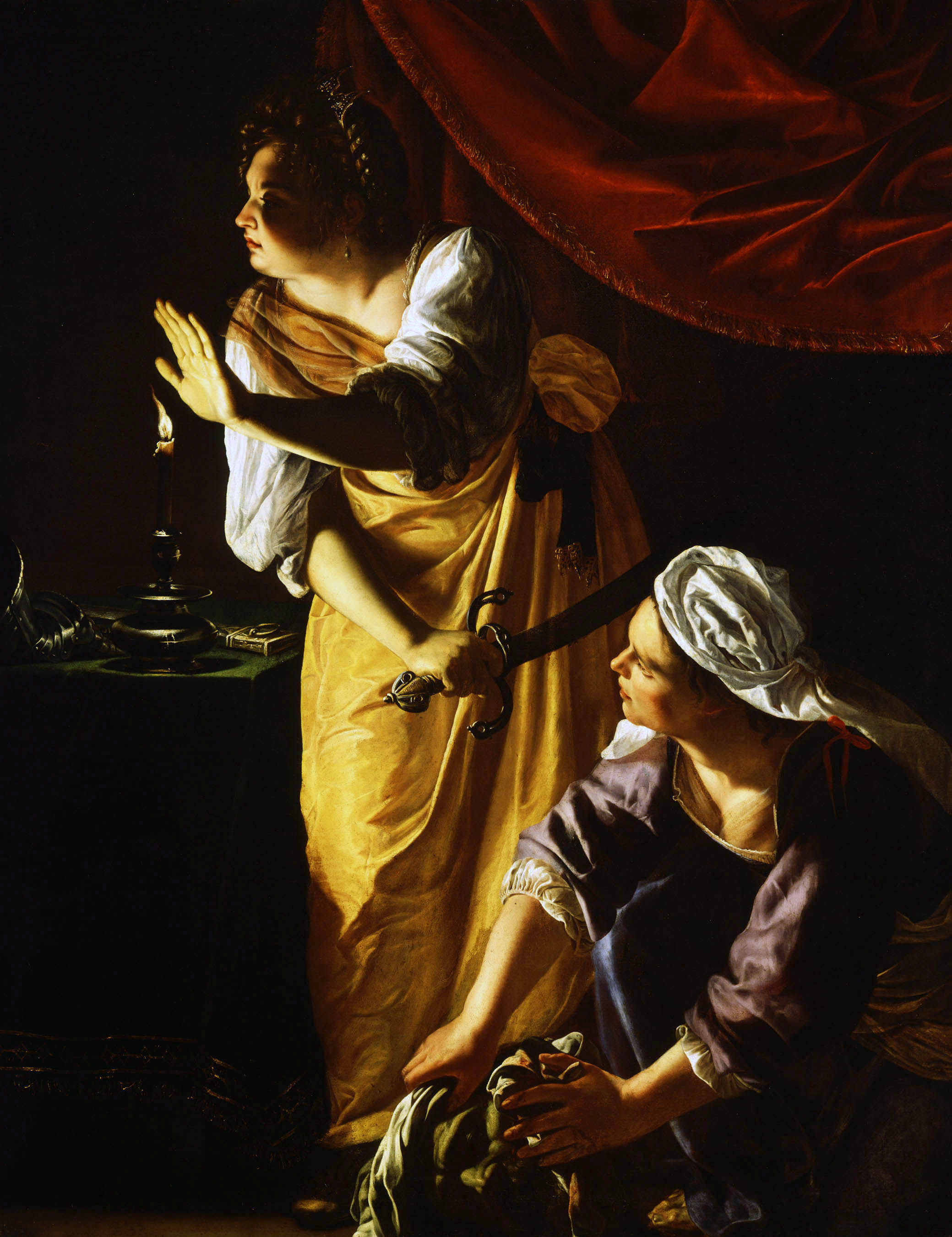
Artemisia Gentileschi, Judith and her Maidservant, c. 1625, oil on canvas. Detroit Institute of Arts, USA

=== The Book of Judith ===
Her sandal ravished his eye,

Her beauty made captive his soul,

The sword passed through his neck.

— Book of Judith, 16:9

The Book of Judith is a deuterocanonical text that follows the triumph of Judith, a Jewish widow from Bethulia, in her assassination of the Assyrian General Holofernes. Bethulia was under siege and on the verge of surrender following the invasion of the Assyrian army. Unable to stand by while her people suffered, Judith set out to enact divine justice by killing their general, Holofernes, and ultimately dismantling the Assyrian forces.

With a scheme to feign surrender, Judith adorned herself in finery to seduce Holofernes. Along with her handmaiden, Abra, the two women approached the enemy encampment with an act of deference that granted them entry. Holofernes quickly succumbed to Judith and invited her to a banquet in his private quarters soon after her arrival.

Holofernes drank himself into a stupor on the night of the banquet while celebrating his perceived victory. Judith, who he had hoped to bed, used this as her opportunity to finish her task. With his sword, she beheads Holofernes in two fell blows. Judith and Abra then return to Bethulia with the severed head of the general in a sack, effectively ending the conflict.

=== The Catholic Reformation ===
Baroque art came about during the Catholic Reformation (also known as the Counter-Reformation) in the 17th century. This was a period when Protestantism was rapidly gaining ground in Europe, as an alternative to Catholicism, which threatened the might of the Roman Catholic Church. This new theology fundamentally rejected the perceived worship of religious iconography on the grounds of idolatry, with the guidance of figures such as John Calvin and Martin Luther. In response, the Council of Trent reaffirmed the importance of the visual arts for the Catholic faith. Baroque art served as an extension of the influence of the Catholic Church, most often depicting historical and religious imagery through heightened realism.

Judith is a figure that has been both embraced and rejected by the Catholic and Protestant denominations through time. Indeed, depending on the potential use of Judith within a Christian narrative, she is either a symbol of purity or temptation. But during the Catholic Reformation Judith remained most often a symbol of divine virtue to contrast the heretical Holofernes.

== History ==
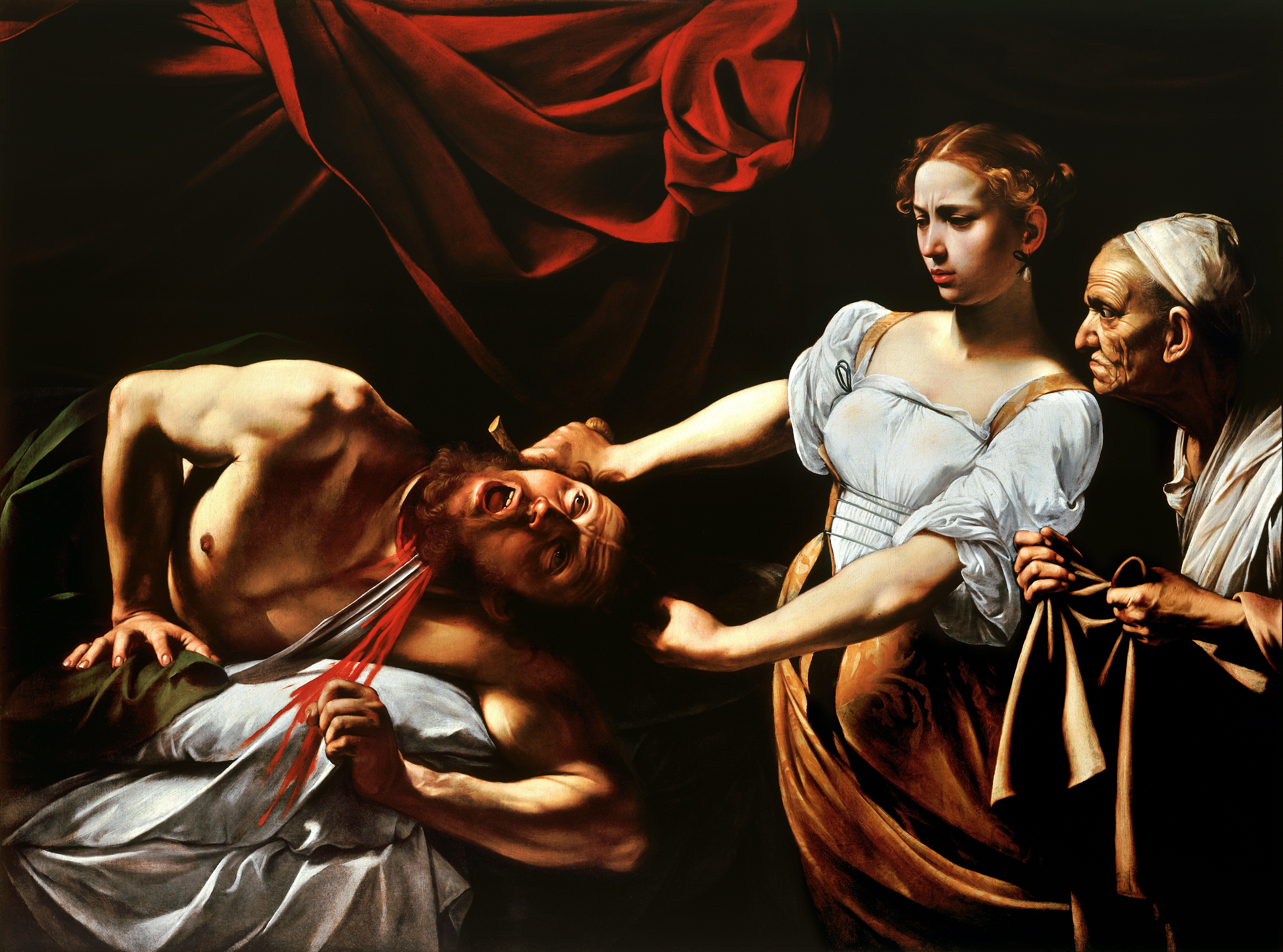
Judith Beheading Holofernes, c. 1598–99, by Caravaggio

Gentileschi was one of many artists who used Judith as a prominent and recurring subject throughout the Baroque period. In fact, Orazio Gentileschi, Artemisia Gentileschi's father, painted Judith and Her Maidservant with the Head of Holofernes c. 1610. Both artists assign the scene with a sense of urgency by choosing moments within the story that are filled with tension.

This similarity in theme and composition may have been due to the work of Michelangelo Merisi da Caravaggio, whose style so influenced Gentileschi's. His famous painting of Judith Beheading Holofernes (c. 1598–99) depicted the brutality of the action with an unprecedented realism.The Uffizi Judith was commissioned by Grand Duke Cosimo II de' Medici who was responsible for art patronage at the Medici court. Presumably, Cosimo had seen the original Naples Judith and requested a variation to be made for his wife, Maria Magdalena. The painting would ultimately be included in a larger collection of artworks at the Pitti Palace which portrayed biblical heroines. Gentileschi received 50 scudi as payment for her work.

In the late 1700s, a Grand Duchess disapproved of the gruesome depiction of a usually timid scene, and had the painting moved to an isolated part of the Uffizi. There it remained until the 20th century, when this painting, including many others, was damaged in the 1993 terrorist bombing of the Pitti Palace. Following its restoration, the painting was once again placed in a largely peripheral location within the gallery. Now, Gentileschi's most prominent piece shares space with other great Baroque artists, including Caravaggio.

== Interpretation ==
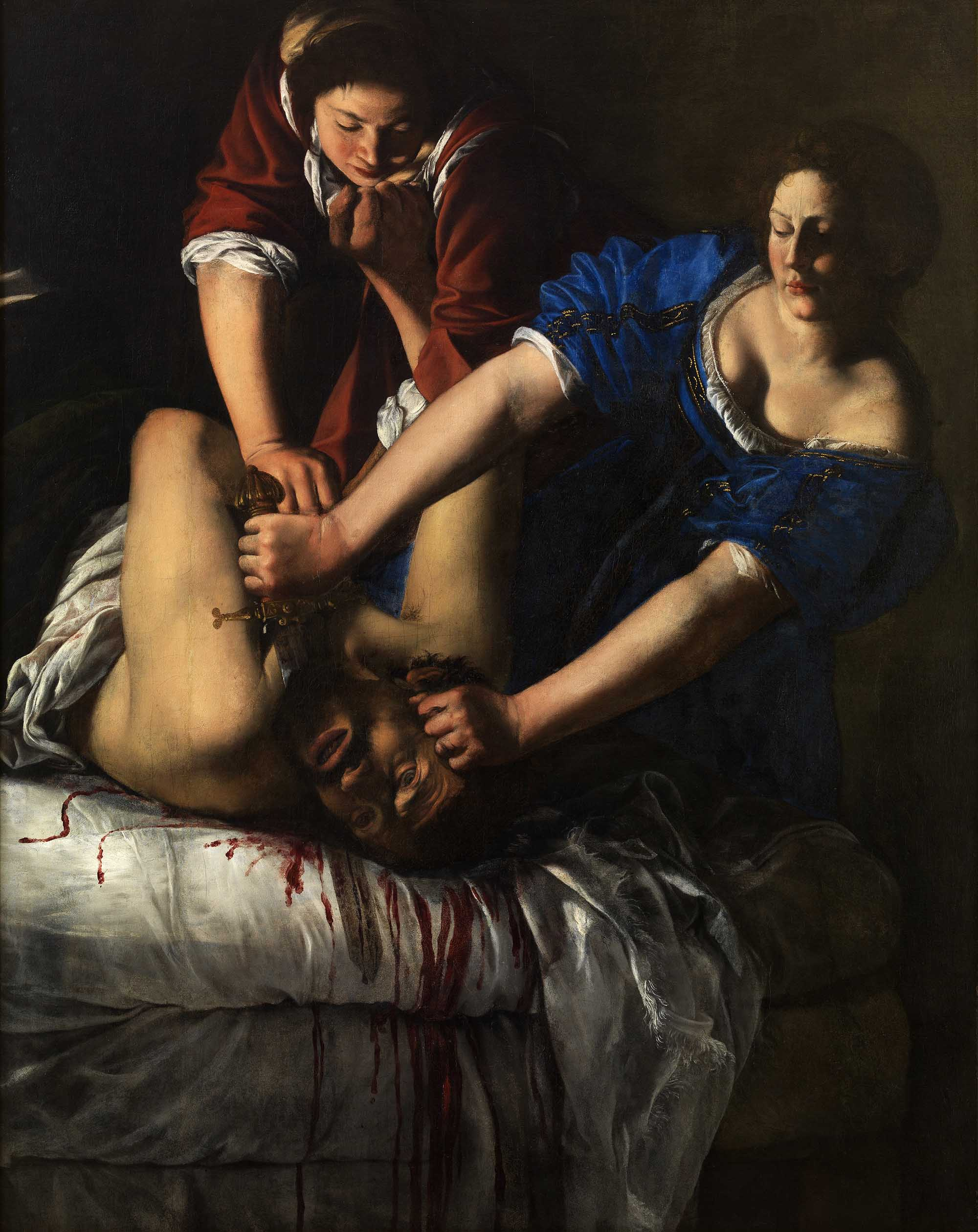
Artemisia Gentileschi, Judith Slaying Holofernes, c 1612, Museo e Real Bosco di Capodimonte, Naples, Italy

=== Artist ===
Artemisia Gentileschi was born in Rome in 1593 and was the only daughter of Mannerist painter Orazio Gentileschi and Prudentia Montone Gentileschi. Orazio took notice of Artemisia's potential as a painter at an early age and helped to cultivate it. By 1610 she had successfully produced Susanna and the Elders, which is known to be her first signed painting. Shortly after her artistic debut, the painter Agostino Tassi, a colleague of Orazio who was hired to teach Artemisia linear perspective, raped the young Artemisia. A public trial was later brought forward and lasted through the summer of 1612. While under oath, and throughout torture by the Sibille, Artemisia avowed: "It's true, it's true, it's true, everything that I said." Tassi was ultimately found guilty of the crime and temporarily banished from Rome.

This history is relevant as Gentileschi's early life has come to inform the perspectives of many contemporary feminist art historians, including Mary Garrard, and particularly in the case of Judith Slaying Holofernes.

==== Judith as a self-portrait ====
There exists a pattern of Gentileschi using her figure as a model in her work which has afforded the artist the innate ability to render the female form. Although this practice would not constitute every painting a self-portrait, there are those with that exact intention, including works such as the Self-Portrait as Saint Catherine of Alexandria from 1616 and the Self-Portrait as the Allegory of Painting, c. 1628. The genre of self-portraiture had been made popular at this time by artists such as Caravaggio and Rembrandt.

That said, whether or not the various Judiths are allegorical self-portraits is a rather contentious subject. Gentileschi's violent depiction of the Judith theme is, according to Mary Garrard, most often made parallel to the traumatic events within her early life and is centered on gendered defiance. To the contrary, scholars such as Griselda Pollock and Elena Ciletti push back against this perspective, arguing instead that the near-constant mention of her assault only succeeds in limiting Gentileschi's image.

Self-portraits by Artemisia Gentileschi
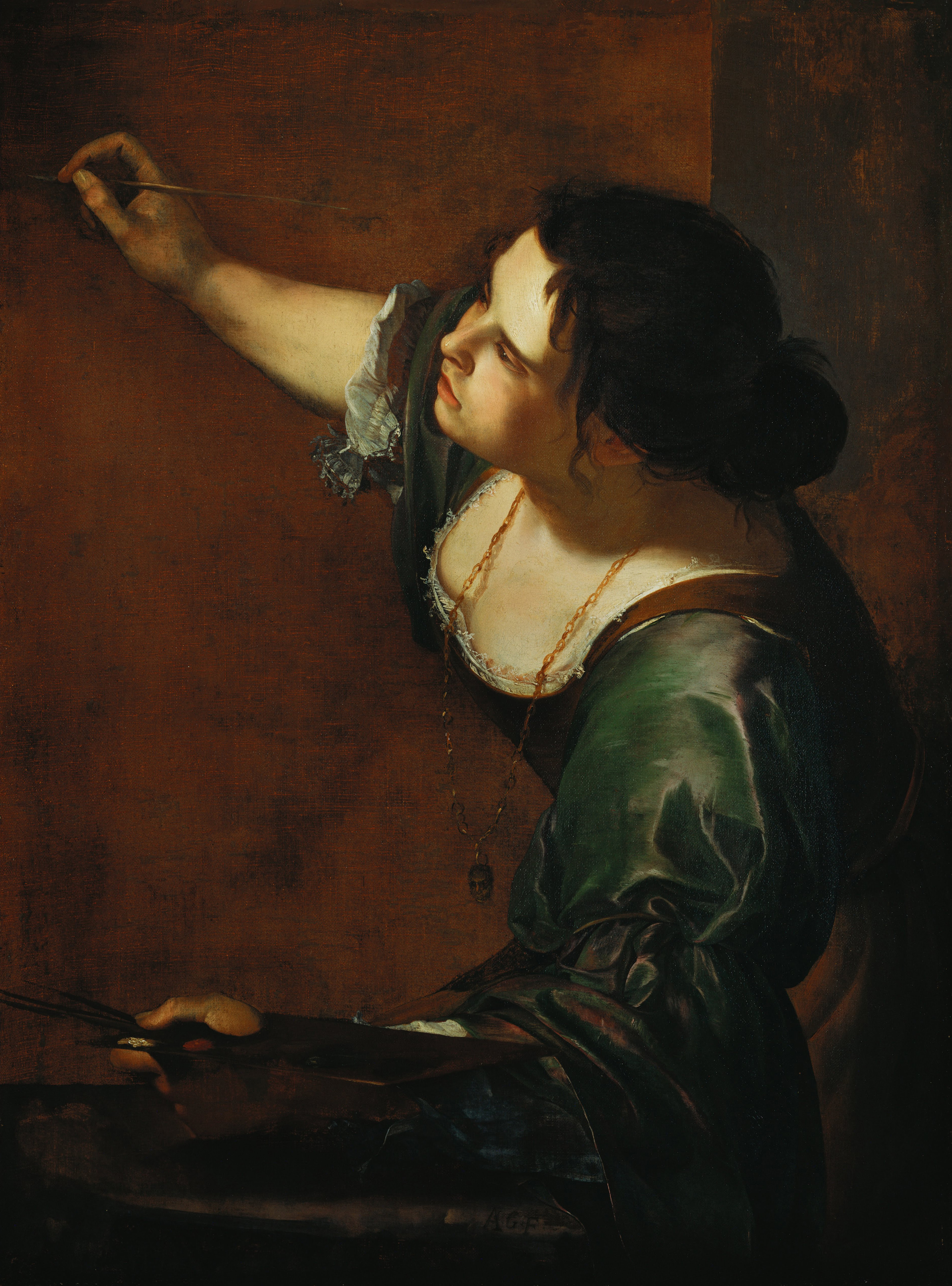
Self-Portrait as the Allegory of Painting

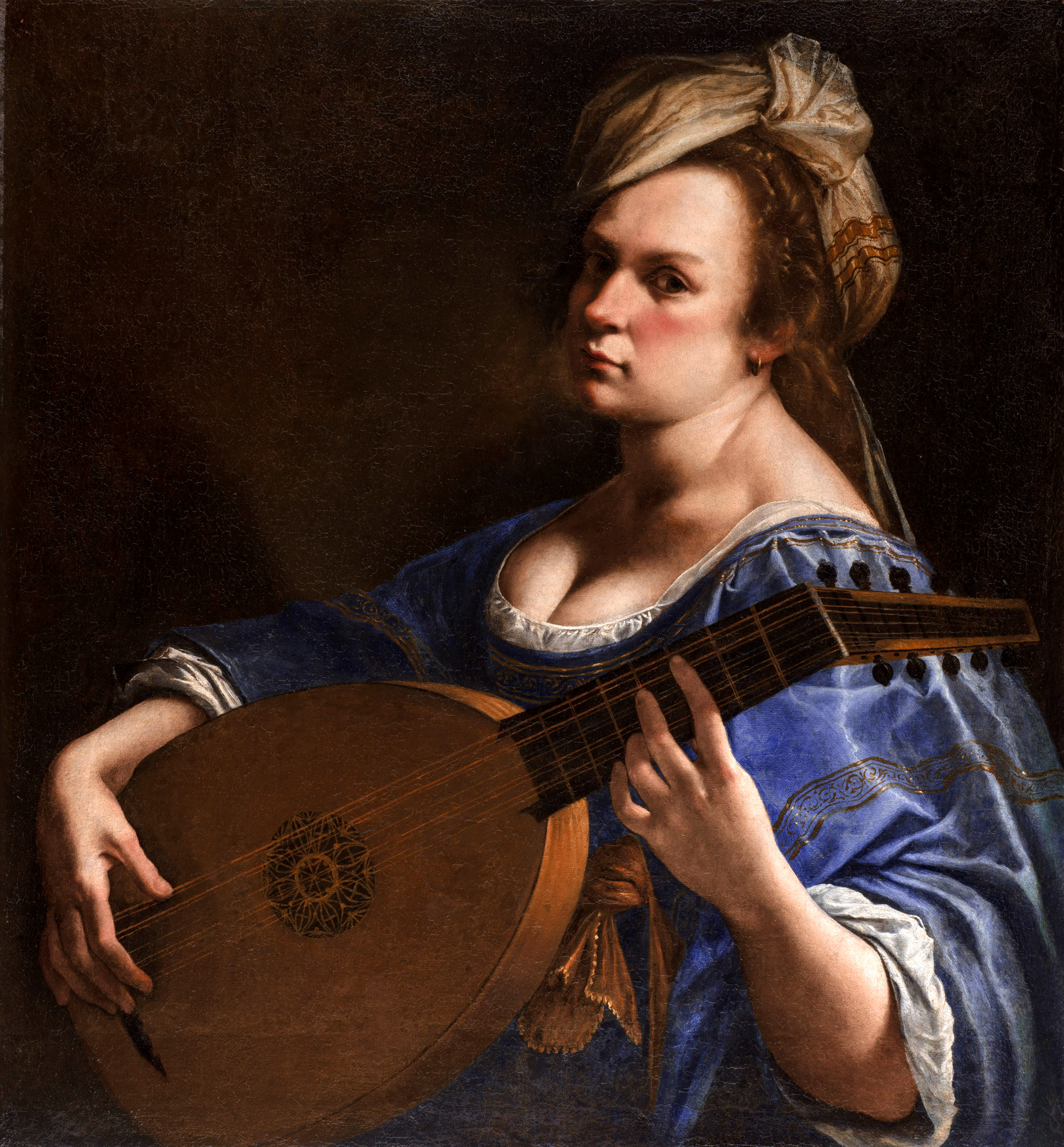
Self-Portrait as a Lute Player

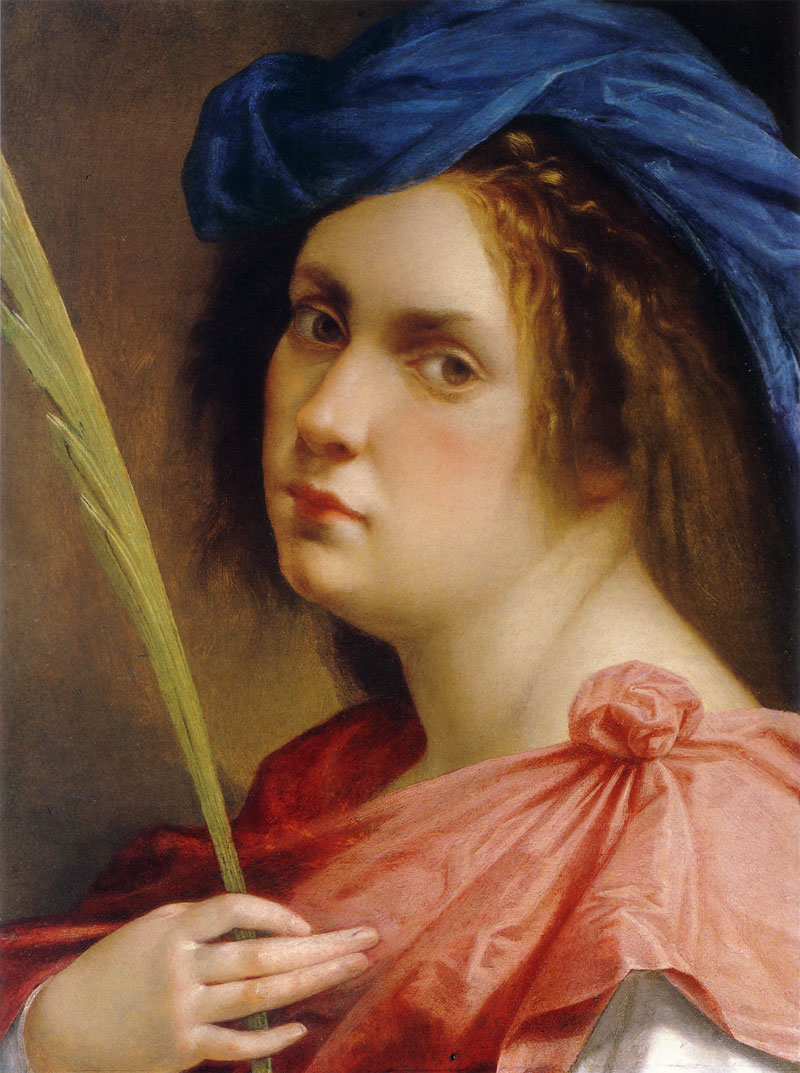
Self-Portrait as a Female Martyr

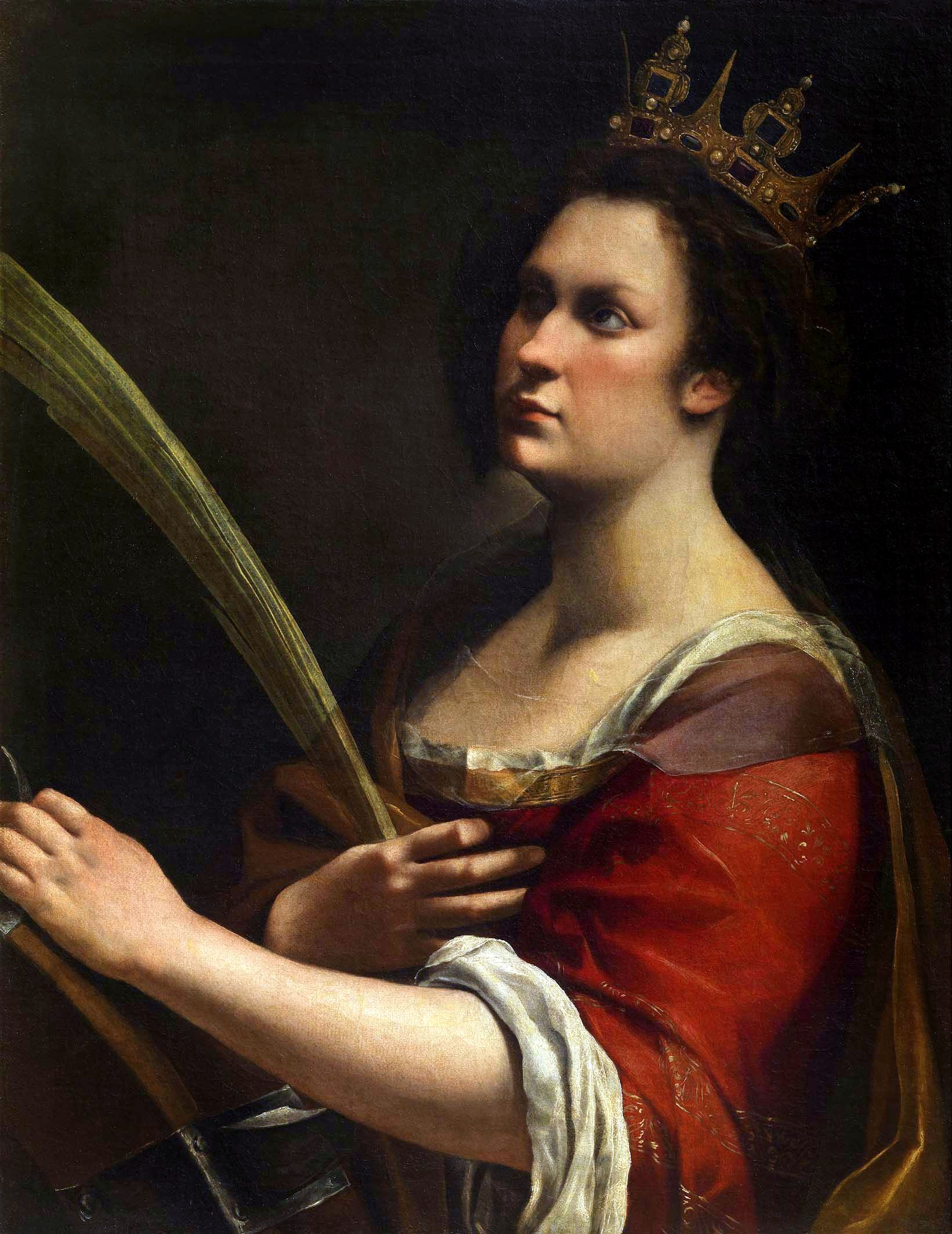
Saint Catherine of Alexandria, Uffizi

== See also ==
- List of works by Artemisia Gentileschi
