= Self-Portrait as a Female Martyr =

Painting by Artemisia Gentileschi

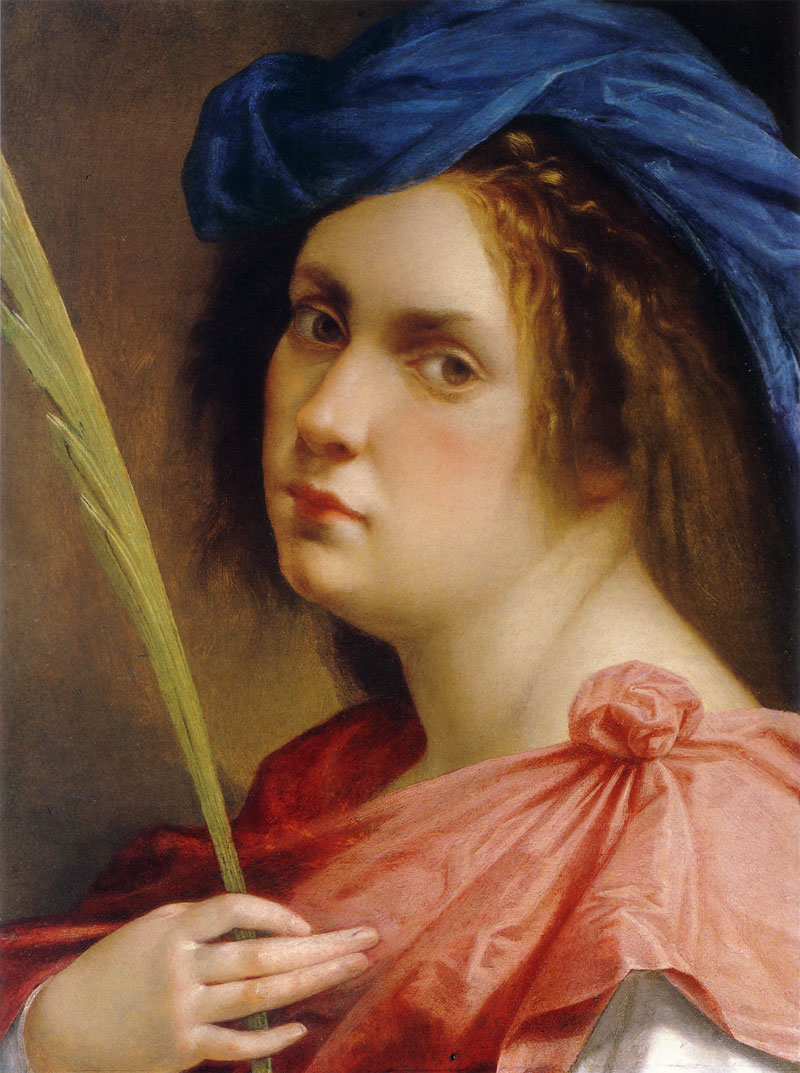
- Artist: Artemisia Gentileschi
- Year: c. 1615
- Medium: Oil on panel
- Dimensions: 31.75 cm × 24.76 cm (12.50 in × 9.75 in)
- Location: Private collection, USA

Self-Portrait as a Female Martyr, is also known as the Self-Portrait as a Martyr Saint. This painting was created by the Italian female artist, Artemisia Gentileschi. This self-portrait was made around 1615 depicting the artist herself as a martyr. It is one of two paintings by Gentileschi painted with oil on a wood panel. This self-portrait is currently in a private collection in the United States.

== Description ==
An inscription on the reverse confirms that it is painted by the artist Artemisia Gentileschi. The inscription is written in Italian which Inscribes: Di Mano di Artemisia figlia di A.rili.Lomi/Pisano Nipote di Orzio. This roughly translates to: Di Mano di Artemisia daughter of A.rili.Lomi/Pisano Grandson of Orzio.

There has been much debate over whether Gentileschi had painted herself or a specific saint. It was noted by Keith Christiansen that the painting had to be a self-portrait of the artist instead of a Christian saint because of the physical features in the self-portrait. The description of the woman’s bow lips, the dip in the nose, and round face are identical to Gentileschi’s features. These features were also similar to another one of Gentileschi's paintings she made around this time period, Allegory of Inclination. Lastly, Gentileschi's use of rose drapery and lapis blue paint is similar to the paint in Mary Magdalene, another of Gentileschi's works of art as well. This concluded the discussion of this painting being a self-portrait.

The artist depicts herself in the style of a martyr, which can be seen with the yellow palm frond in her hand. The depiction of palm fronds was a way to symbolize said martyrdom. This representation goes back as early as the Revelation in the Christian bible. If the palm frond was not there, the self-portrait of a woman martyr would turn into just a regular self-portrait painting. It was very common in the seventeenth century for women to be painted as biblical female martyrs; because paintings of woman were meant to emit innocence, having saint like features and doing saint like acts was seen as the ideal woman.

Enrica Guerra suggested that the awkward proportion of the hand in comparison to the head suggests that it may have been added at a later stage. The only major change besides the hand in the painting is that Gentileschi painted a turban on the woman, though it is unknown when this change occurred. It was very popular for many artists at this time to depict their self-portraits with a turban, but this was not done to depict a certain saint. Since the painting does not appear to have been cut down in size, the painting is also accurate to what Gentileschi painted. It is unusual in this time period for there to be a painting of a martyr that lacked the attribute of a specific saint in the painting. Artemisia Gentileschi painted self-portraits as several different people in many of her artworks, such as the Self-Portrait as the Allegory of Painting, Self-Portrait as a Lute Player, and Self-Portrait as Saint Catherine of Alexandria yet this was the only Gentileschi did where she depicted herself as the saint.

=== Painting Materials and Technique ===
The painting was made on a wood panel in oil paint. This was unlike Artemisia Gentileschi's usual method of painting, which was usually done with oil on a canvas. Gentileschi would use a technique called sfumato which is when paint is delicately blended together. She would usually use a black background while creating her artwork. Gentileschi also put an emphasis of realism in her works of art. Mary Gerrard mentions how the size of the panel can also hint at intimacy. The panel being smaller indicated that it was a more private meaning and may be a part of some sort of symbolism.

== History ==
This painting is a Baroque artwork. In the seventeenth century, Baroque could be seen as any medium of art from painting, sculpting, ceramics, to many more. Baroque art is also used in many Catholic settings, such as churches, and is used in public domains. The art represented important moments in the Bible that were revered, and artists would be hired to paint certain saints. The goal was to have the onlookers be filled with emotion while looking at the pieces. Baroque art was even used in political religious settings. This particular baroque painting is believed to have been made during the artist's time in Florence, based on both the appearance as well as some supplier records discovered in archives. The date is recorded as 1614 but since the new year in Florence did not begin until March the date is technically 1615. The work is signed "Artemisia Lomi", the name she assumed while working in Florence to associate herself with her uncle Aurelio Lomi, who had already established a reputation there. Yael Evan mentions that Gentileschi desired to be treated as if she was a male painter. During this time period, women were not allowed into any academy of arts. Being seen as a male painter in that century would have been a great honor.

The artist, Gentileschi painted this portrait depicting herself as a female martyr when she was twenty-two. Helen Clements describes Gentileschi’s painting as portraying herself in a gentle and more intimate manner. Clements commented on the way Gentileschi looked in the painting mentioning that the women looks very soft. There is no pity emitting from the painting. Clements examines the theory that Gentileschi was painting herself as a martyr saint to reflect how she felt when she was raped as a teenager years before. She concludes that Gentileschi's portraits revealed that she did not want to have her past be one of pity and dismay; she denounces the theory that Gentileschi painted herself as a martyr only because of her famous past. Susanna Scarparo portrays Gentileschi as a painter that struggled to be recognized for her skill in the arts rather than being famous for what happened to her in her past. She critiques how previous writing on Gentileschi focused on this rather than her artwork. Gentileschi is one of only a few famous female artists recognized in the 17th century and the first Italian women to specialize in Italian painting. Gentileschi's one of many great achievements was being the first women to join Florence’s Academy of Design. Over the years Gentileschi has made many self-portraits and painted mostly only women in different environments, but only one of her as a martyr.

== Provenance ==
The painting was originally made in Florence. The painting was in the collection of Ignazio Hugford, who lent it to an exhibition in Florence in the 1760s. The painting was in Hugford's possession until 1779. Later on, the painting was in the collection of Martha Beavan née Wallaston of Leintwardine, Herefordshire. At one point Newhouse Galleries had this painting in a private collection in 1995. The self-portrait was sold at Sotheby's London December 9, 1987.

== See also ==
- Self-portraiture
- List of works by Artemisia Gentileschi
