= Mary Magdalene (Artemisia Gentileschi) =

Painting by Artemisia Gentileschi

Penitent Magdalene
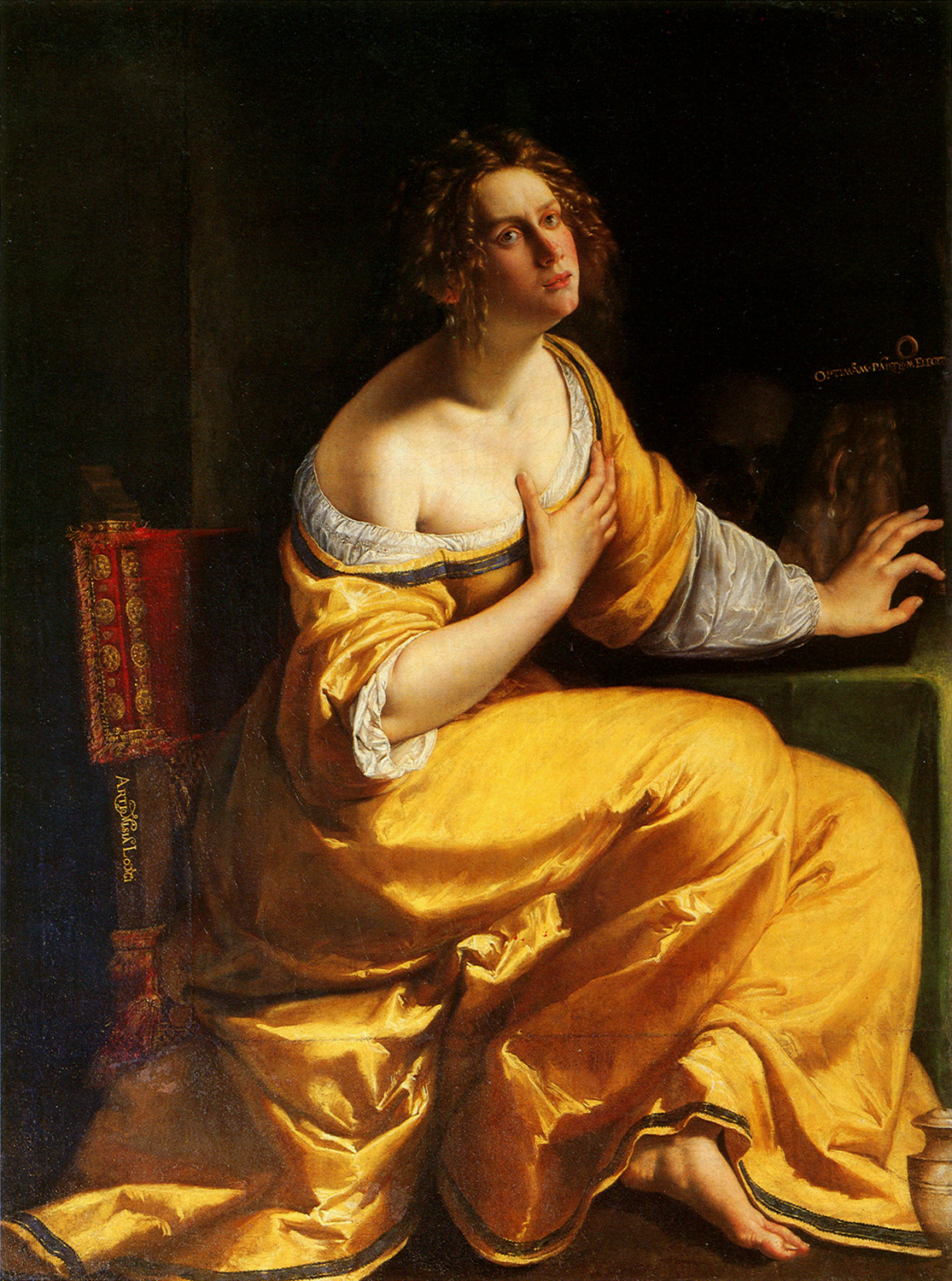
- Artist: Artemisia Gentileschi
- Year: 1616–1618
- Medium: Oil on Canvas
- Movement: Florentine Baroque
- Subject: Mary Magdalene
- Dimensions: 108 cm × 146.5 cm (43 in × 57.7 in)
- Location: Pitti Palace, Florence
- Website: https://www.uffizi.it/en/artworks/artemisia-saint-mary-magdalen

Penitent Magdalene is a 1616–1618 painting by the Italian baroque artist Artemisia Gentileschi. This painting hangs in the Pitti Palace in Florence. The subject is the biblical figure Mary Magdalene, but the painting references another biblical woman, Mary, the sister of Lazarus. This painting was likely painted during Gentileschi's Florentine period. A defaced replica of the painting was found in a cellar in Germany in 2011.

== Description ==
=== Subject matter ===
The figure portrayed is Mary Magdalene in a gown of yellow silk. This image of Mary Magdalene demonstrates the saint as a “model of Zealous devotion,” as she is shown in the moment of her changing from a sinner's path to one devoted to Christ. Magdalene's depiction departs from her traditional representation: Mary Magdalene is repentant and suffering, but she is not in landscape setting and there is no crucifix by her.

The work is signed "Artemisia Lomi" on the wooden upright of the chair, although this signature may be by a later hand. The painting is constructed from three pieces of canvas, with the strip running down the left hand side and the chair upon which the signature is found being a possible later addition.

=== Style and influence ===
Gentileschi would not have been welcome in workshops or academies because she was a woman. Despite this, Gentileschi became a member of the Accademia delle Arti del Disegno in 1616. The exaggerated gesture and expression, as well as the luxurious materials in this painting, are stylistic indicators that this painting was painted in Florence. Raymond Ward Bissell claims these elements, as well as the color scheme of gold, red and green, can be understood in this painting as the Florentine Baroque style.

Gentileschi was known for her innovative interpretations of traditional subjects: she brought a womanly perspective to an otherwise male-dominated field, and therefore commonly expressed stories of heroism by women.

Gentileschi was greatly influenced by the works of Caravaggio, who also painted scenes featuring Mary Magdalene as Gentileschi was growing up. Gentileschi would develop her dramatic use of light and shadows, known as chiaroscuro, from the paintings of Caravaggio she had access to, who made dramatic use of this technique. Chiaroscuro in the Penitent Magdalene is evident in the stark contrast between the figure and her background, and in the contrast between the fabric and folds of her dress.

== Interpretation ==
=== Iconography ===
This depiction blends elements from two different biblical women: Mary, the sister of Lazarus (as referenced by the engraving on the mirror) and Mary Magdalene, signified by the jar of ointment at her feet. The combination of the two biblical characters to form Mary Magdalene was to be expected, as they were considered the same person in the sixth century. Though Mary Magdalene's dress has slipped offer her shoulder, it does not reveal her body, alluding to Mary Magdalene's eroticized past, as she is often depicted. Mary Magdalene was a commonly depicted figure at this time due to her relatable story: Mary Magdalene underwent a transition from a sinner to a repentant sinner.

Her devotion is expressed in the upward glance toward heaven, and her intenseness as she leaves behind her erotic past. This scene is further supported as a moment of conversion as Mary pushes away a mirror (a symbol of vanity) inscribed with the words Optimam partem elegit (“You have chosen the best part”). The quote is from the Bible, Luke 10: 41–42, in which Jesus teaches Martha that her sister Mary has made a better choice in embracing a spiritual life. It is improbable that this phrase was added by Gentileschi, but at a later point in time, as is suggested by the words appearing in the gloss of the canvas.

Mary Magdalene's expensive clothing and her sensual appearance do not contradict the spiritual meaning of this piece. The exaggerated gesture of Mary's left arm and her turning away from the jewelry box next to her together indicate that she is refusing vanity.

=== Artemisia as Mary Magdalene ===
Scholars like Mary Garrard interpret Artemisia's works, such as the Penitent Magdalene, to be representing Gentileschi. This interpretation is often understood because both the saint and painter faced stigmatization for being sexually promiscuous. The situations between the two figures of Mary Magdalene and Artemisia differ, however, because Mary Magdalene's stigma derives from her background as a prostitute, while Gentileschi's stigma stems from her rape trial in 1612. This interpretation is made due to the inscription, "Optimam partem elegit," (“you have chosen the best part”), which is interpreted as Gentileschi making the most of her assault by placing herself in Mary Magdalene's position. This interpretation could be applied to her professional success though, rather than making the most of her assault.

In more recent scholarship academics such as Rebecca Mead have responded to the interpretation of Gentileschi's painting through the lens of her sexual assault, and subsequent understanding of Gentileschi's paintings as a channel for revenge, has been challenged. This perspective has been challenged because researchers want to view Gentileschi through multiple facets of her life; not just through her assault, but through her perspectives as a mother, as a successful business woman, and her “erotic passion”. Rather than see Gentileschi's paintings, such as the Penitent Magdalene, as a self portrait of Gentileschi for her similar features, one should view the Penitent Magdalene and think of the access Gentileschi had to source materials other than herself.

== History ==
=== Historical context ===
Artemisia Gentileschi was born and grew up in Rome in 1593, she is considered one of the most important painters of the Baroque and seventeenth century's styles, being credited for surpassing her artist father, Orazio Gentileschi in talent. She may have met Caravaggio when she was a child, whose use of light and shadow she derived her style from. Their interactions likely occurred before 1606, because Caravaggio was acquaintances with Artemisia's father, Orazio Gentileschi, and Caravaggio would flee Rome that same year. Though Gentileschi was not allowed to travel freely due to her gender and regard for her well-being, she had access to paintings by Caravaggio later in life through her local church, Santa Maria del Popolo, where she could view the Crucifixion of St. Peter and Conversion on the Way to Damascus. Because Artemisia did not create this form of rendering herself, she is considered an adopter of a style rather than a trend setter within the Baroque style.

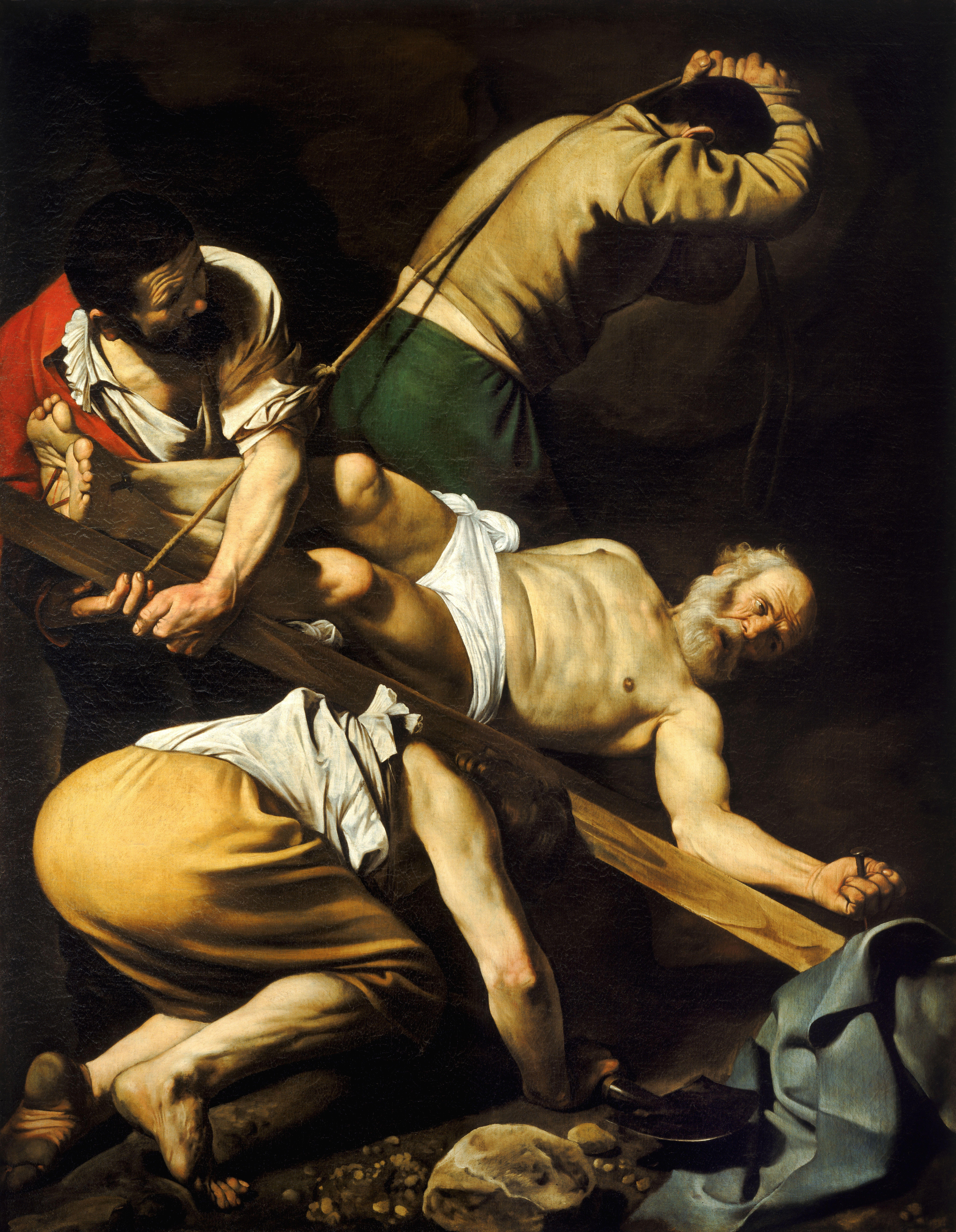
Crucifixion of Saint Peter, Caravaggio

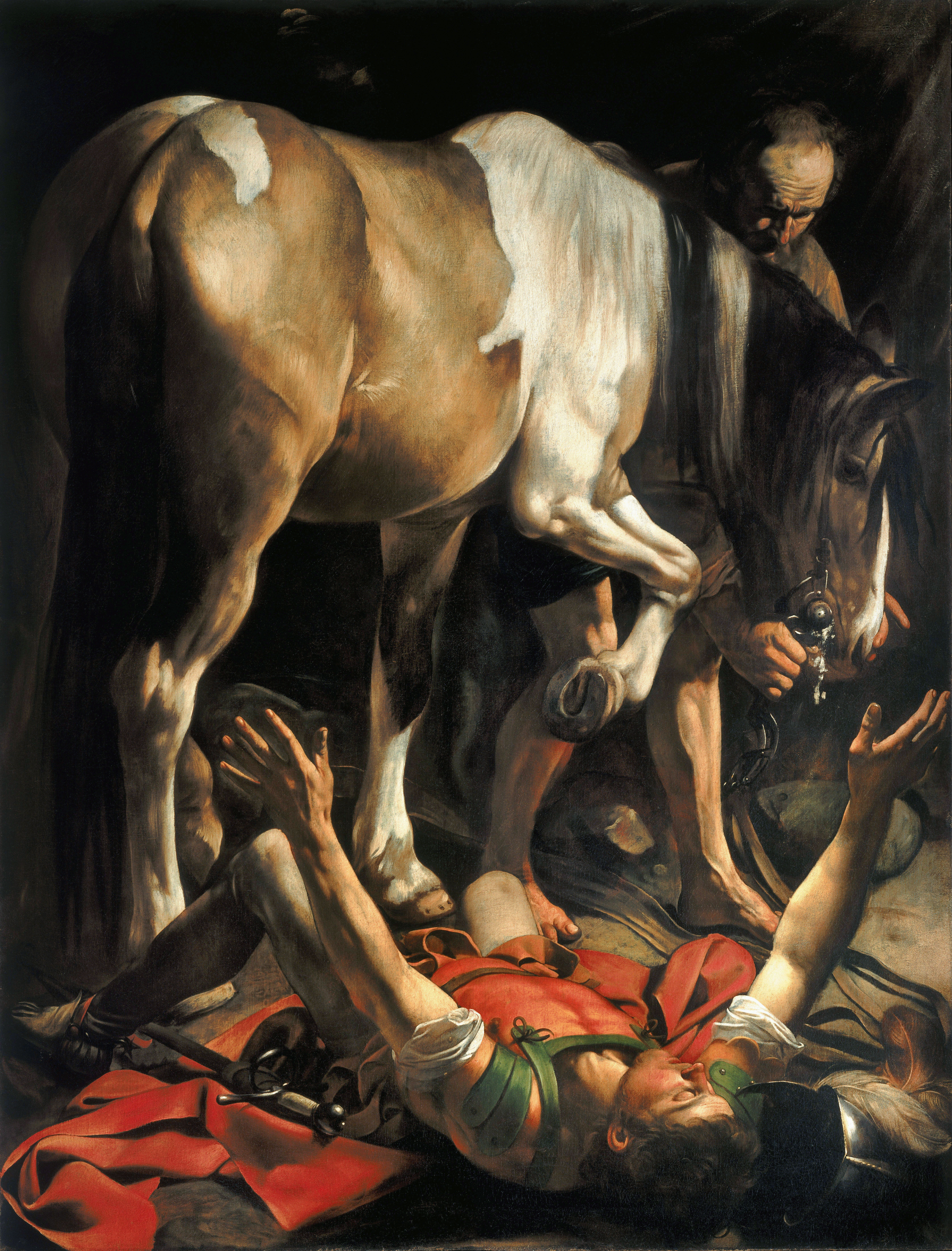
Conversion on the Way to Damascus, Caravaggio

From the years 1614 to 1620, Gentileschi went through her Florentine period: She became a member of the Accademia del Disegno in 1616. When in Florence, Gentileschi had begun using the last name "Lomi." The Penitent Magdalene was signed as “Artemisia Lomi,” rather than "Artemisia Gentileschi" because she was in Florence at the time. She may have chosen to use the name Lomi over her actual last name, Gentileschi, and over her husband's last name, Stiattesi, because Lomi was the last name of Aurelio Lomi, an artist who had more name recognition than either of her other options. In 1620, Gentileschi returned to the town where her father Orazio lived, Genoa, making her stay at the academy between the years 1616 and 1620, when the Penitent Magdalene was painted. A similar work was created by Artemisia in the years 1620-1622, Mary Magdalene in Ecstasy. Other works from Gentileschi's Florentine period include: Female Martyr, Saint Catherine of Alexandria, and the Jael and Sisera in the same period in which the Penitent Magdalen was created. The inclusion of women in workshops and academies was not common practice at this time. Despite this, and being illiterate, Gentileschi learned to read, and maintained correspondences with the like of Don Antonio Ruffo, Cassiano dal Pozzo, Duke Francesco I d’Este and Galileo Galilei. Her letters are mostly addressed to patrons of remarkable social standing, as she ran her own successful workshop.

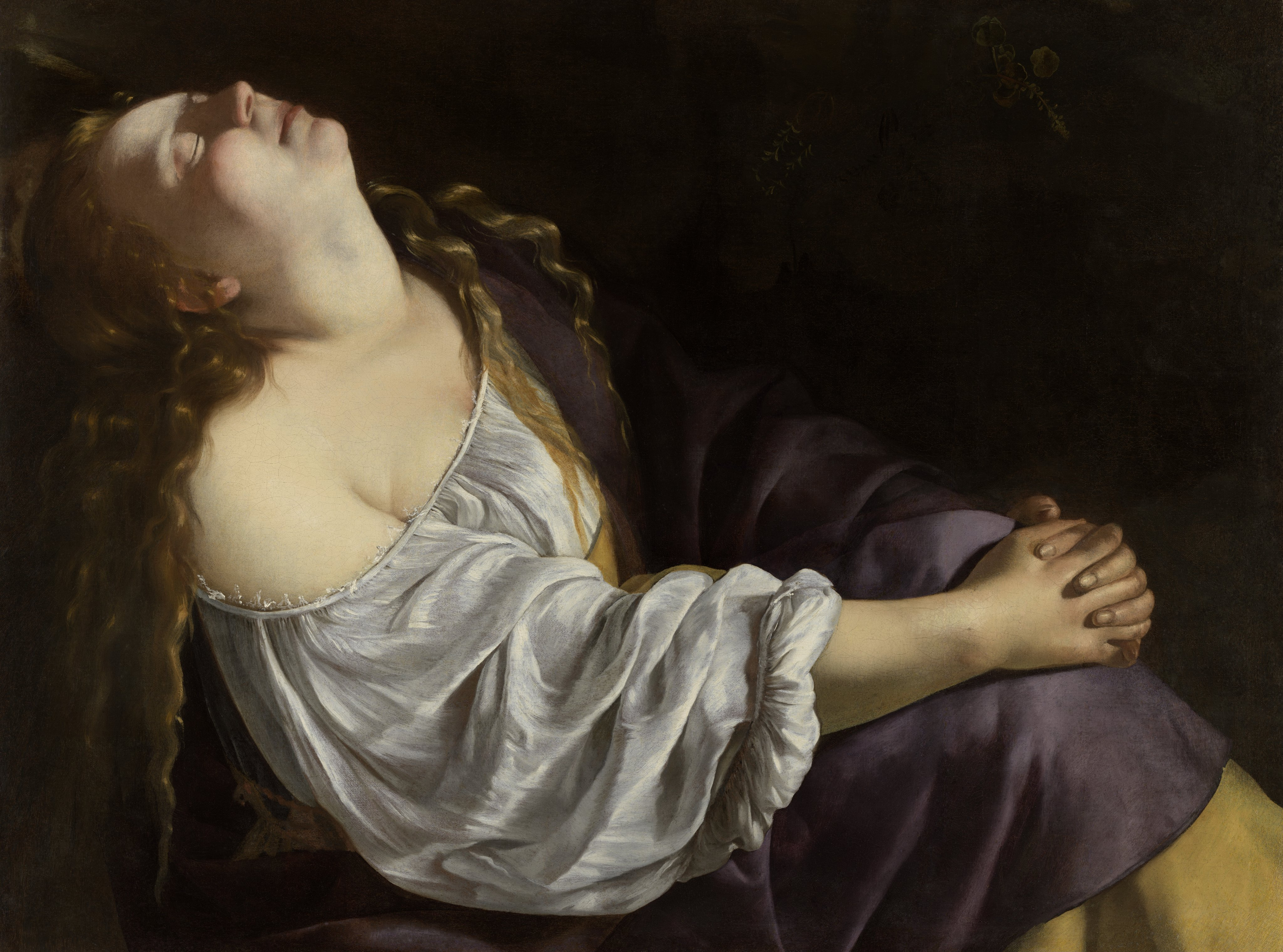
Mary Magdalene in Ecstasy, Gentileschi

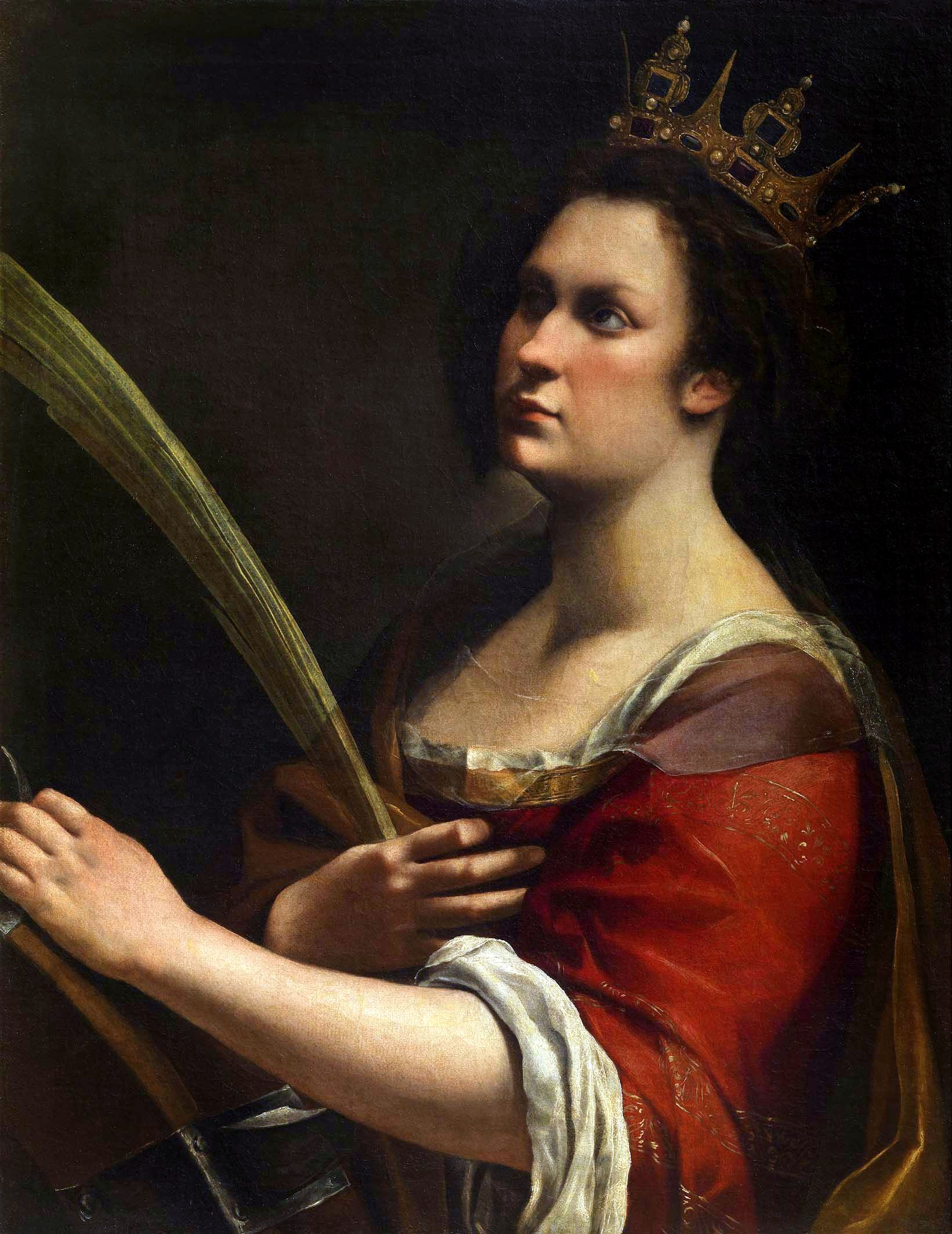
St Catherine of Alexandra, Gentileschi

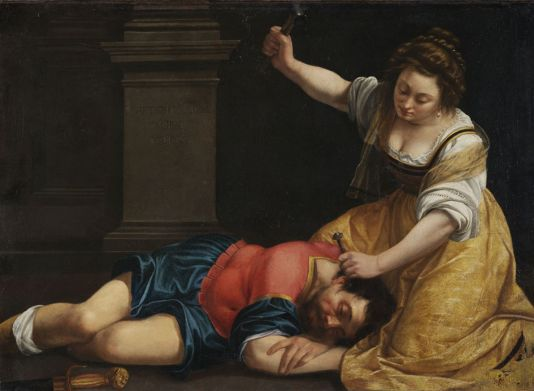
Jael and Sisera, Gentileschi

=== Patronage ===
The work was likely commissioned by the Grand Duchess Maria Maddalena, wife of Cosimo II de Medici. The patron likely ordered this scene specifically, for the similarities between Maddalena's name and Magdalen, so the saint's attributes of piety and penitence would be associated with her too. The luxuriousness of the women's clothing is thought to signal the artist's willingness to adapt her work to the tastes of her patrons. The painting is first mentioned as part of the Pitti Collection in 1826. The painting was restored in 1970 prior to an exhibition.

== See also ==
- List of works by Artemisia Gentileschi
