= Self-Portrait as Saint Catherine of Alexandria =

Painting by Artemisia Gentileschi

- Self Portrait as Saint Catherine of Alexandria
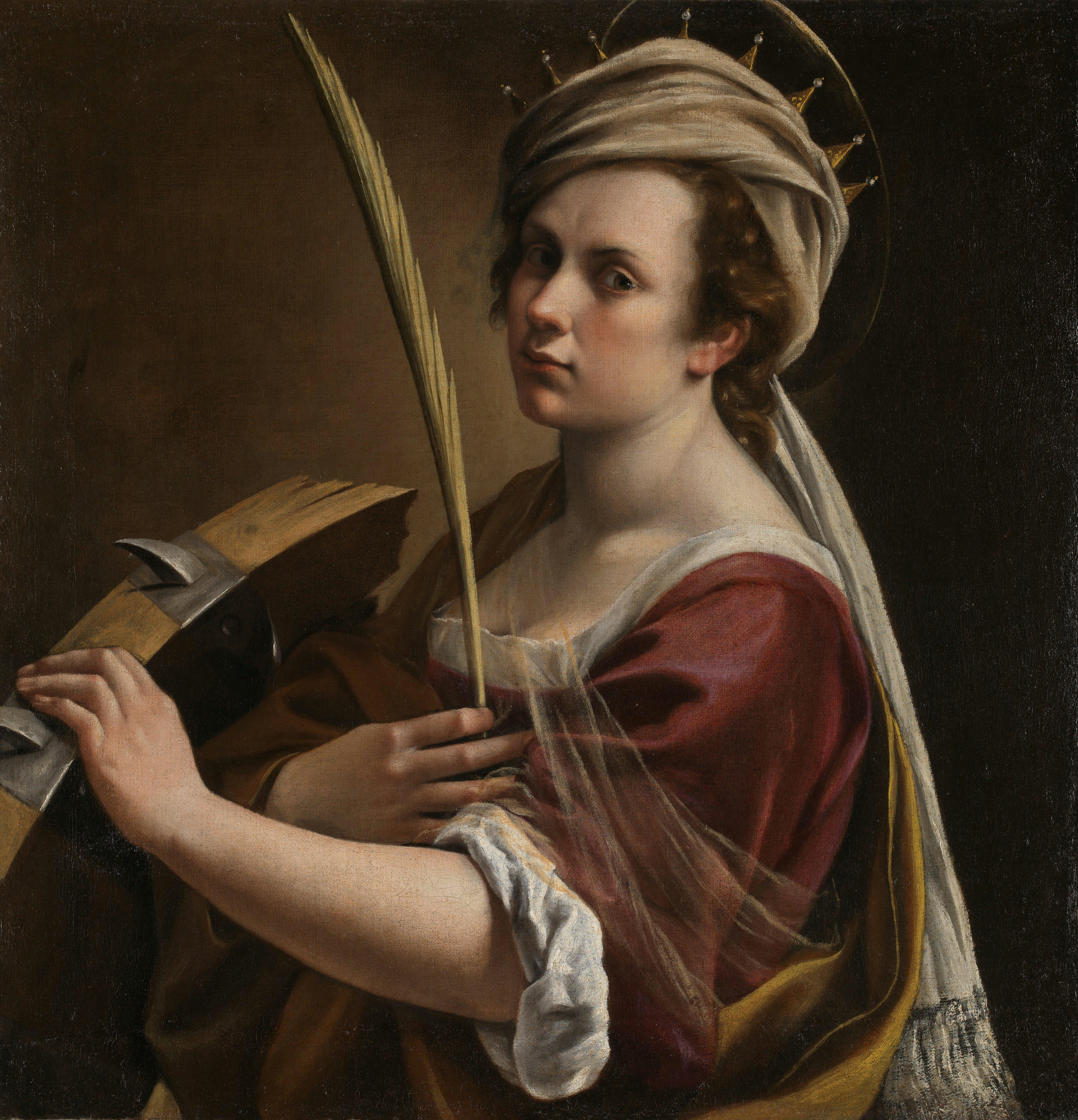
- Artist: Artemisia Gentileschi
- Year: c. 1616
- Medium: oil paint, canvas
- Dimensions: 71.4 cm (28.1 in) × 69 cm (27 in)
- Location: National Gallery
- Accession: NG6671

Self-Portrait as Saint Catherine of Alexandria is a 1615–1617 painting by the Italian Baroque artist Artemisia Gentileschi, showing the artist in the guise of Catherine of Alexandria. It is now in the collection of the National Gallery, London, which purchased it in 2018 for £3.6 million, including about £2.7 million from its American Friends group.

It was painted during Gentileschi's time in Florence, and is similar to her Saint Catherine of Alexandria (c. 1619), now in the Uffizi Gallery. It is one of several paintings of female martyrs that Gentileschi made after her famous 1612 rape trial, in which she (unlike the accused) was subject to torture to test the veracity of her testimony.

== Description ==
The figure is shown in three-quarter view with a broken spiked wheel; according to tradition this was the instrument of torture to which Saint Catherine of Alexandria was subjected before being beheaded. The palm frond she holds in her other hand was also a traditional symbol of martyrdom. The crown she wears under the headscarf suggests her royal status, however along with the halo it is believed to have been added a later date. Current research on the contemporaneous works Artemisia created suggests that this piece began as a self-portrait and was later modified to depict the saint.

== Provenance ==
The original owner of Gentileschi's Self-Portrait as Saint Catherine is unknown, and nothing is recorded of its whereabouts until the early 1940s when the painting was bequeathed by Charles Marie Boudeville to his son. The painting remained in the Boudeville private collection until it was sold at Hôtel Drouot in Paris on 19 December 2017 for €2.4m. The €1.9m hammer price was well above the original estimate of €300,000–€400,000.

It was acquired by London-based dealers Robilant+Voena, and surpassed the 2014 Gentileschi price record for her Mary Magdalene in Ecstasy. In July 2018, the National Gallery in London announced that it had purchased the painting from the dealers for £3.6 million (US$4.7 million). It is the first painting by a woman artist acquired by the National Gallery since 1991, when five paintings by Paula Rego were donated to the museum. On acquiring it, the National Gallery executed restoration on the painting.

== Other self-portraits by Artemisia Gentileschi ==
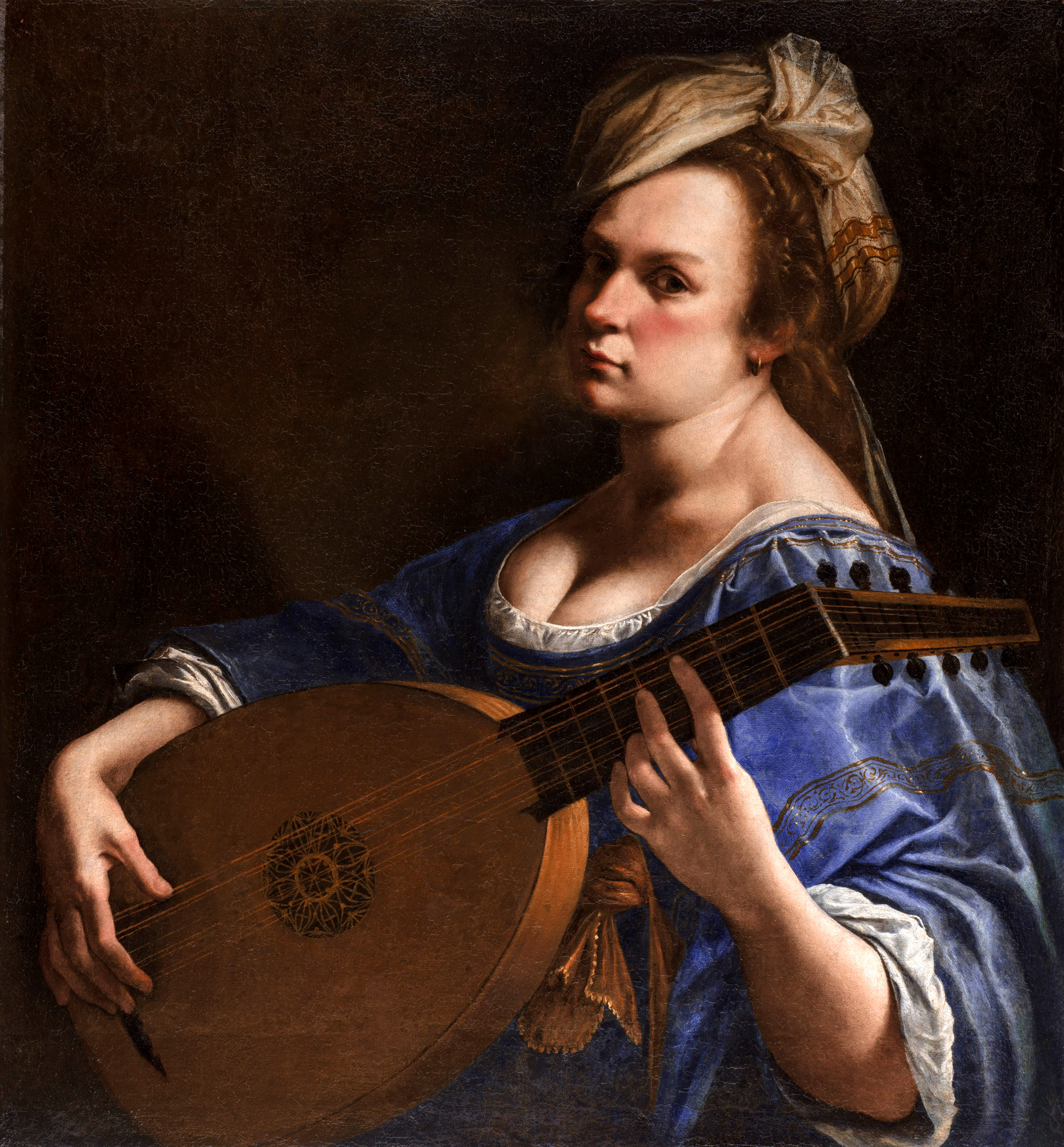
Self-Portrait as a Lute Player

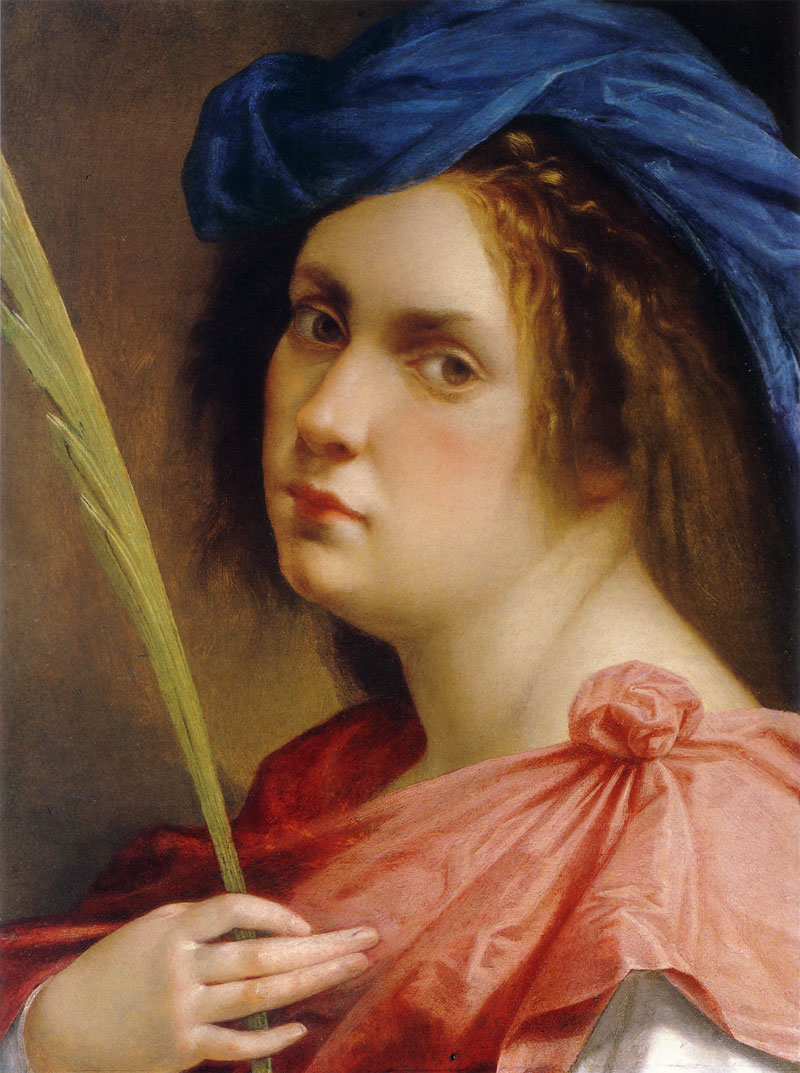
Self-Portrait as a Female Martyr

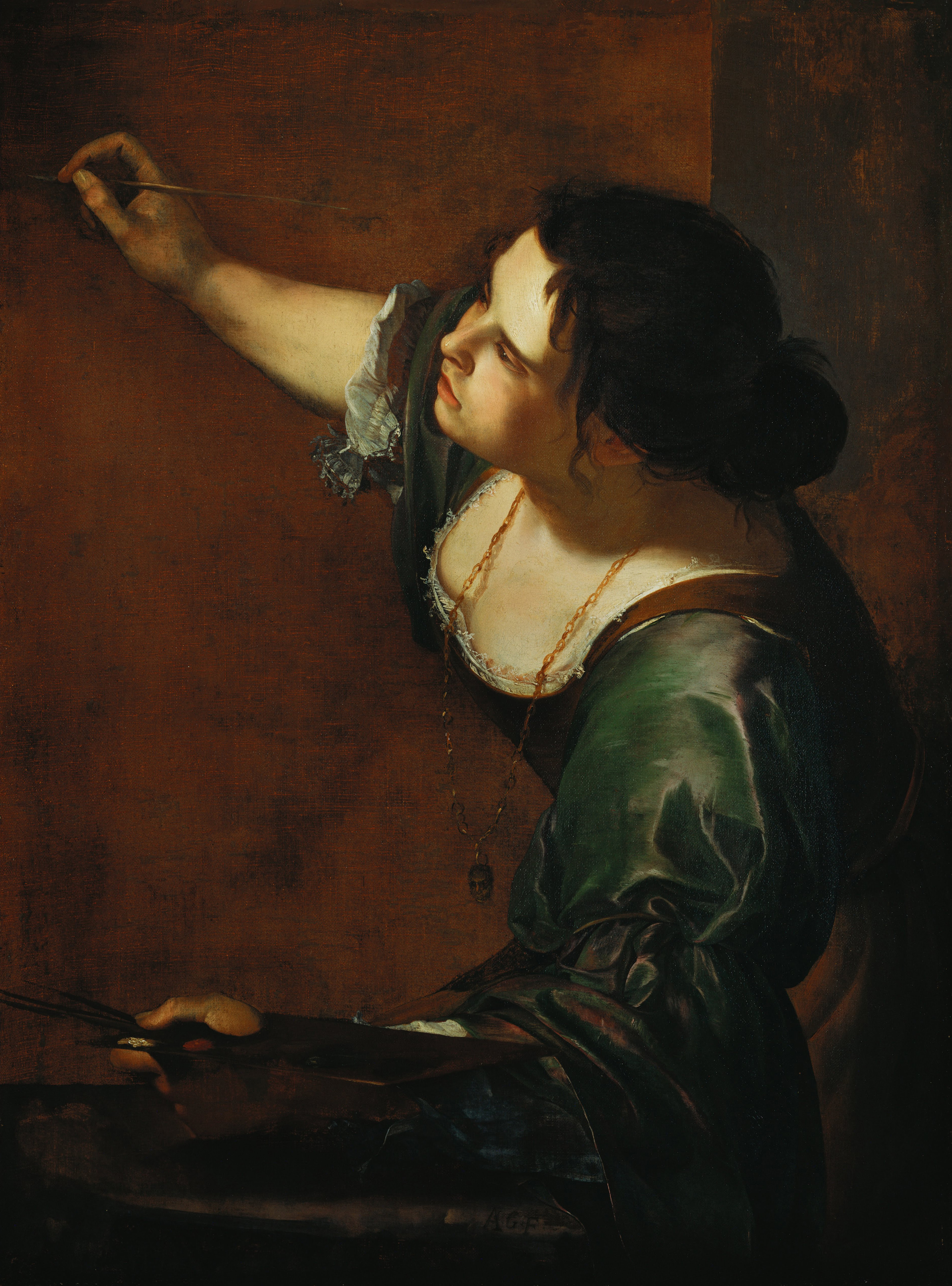
Self-Portrait as the Allegory of Painting

== See also ==
- Self-portraiture
- List of works by Artemisia Gentileschi
