= Self-Portrait as a Lute Player =

Painting by Artemisia Gentileschi

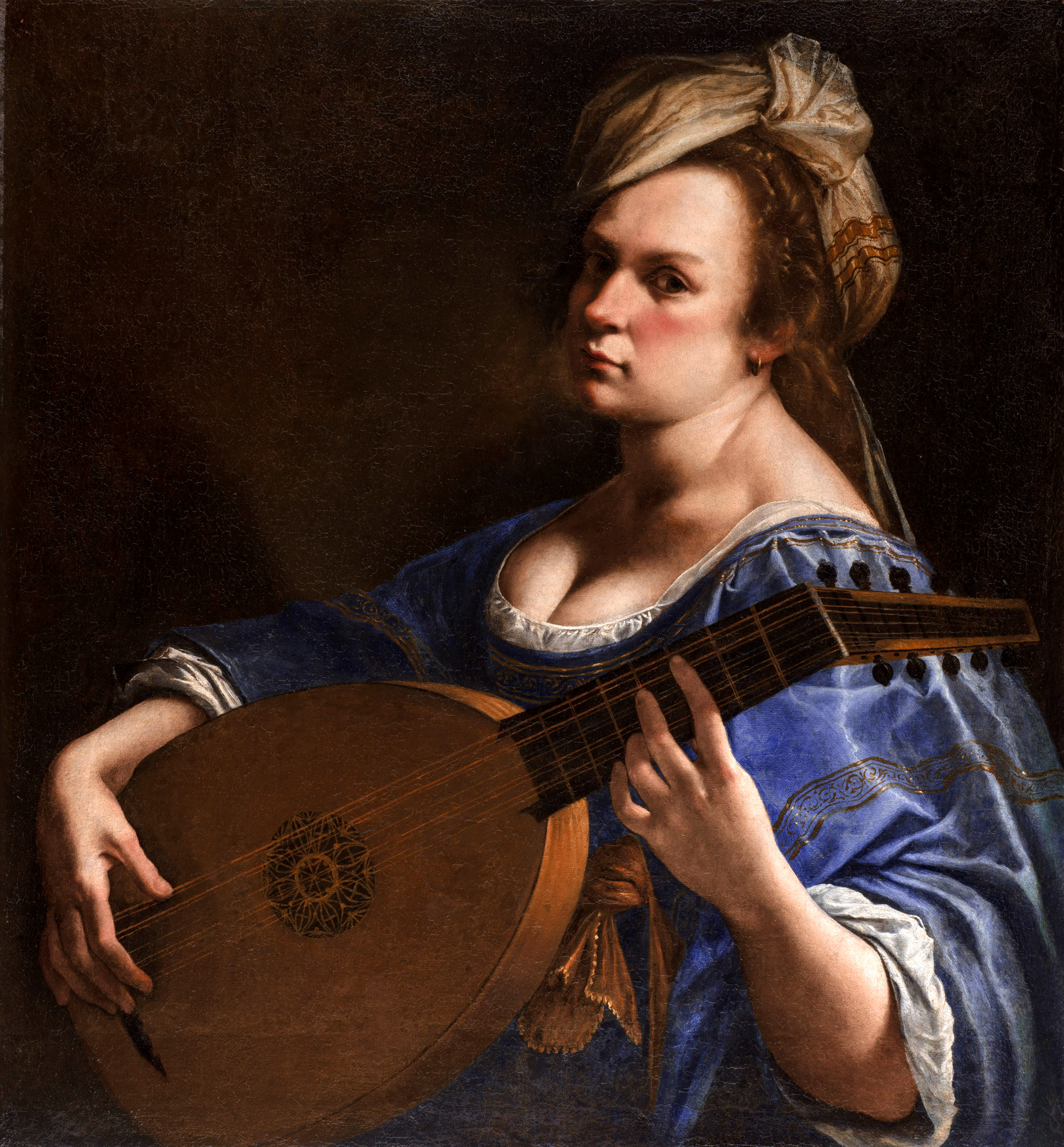
- Artist: Artemisia Gentileschi
- Year: c. 1615
- Medium: oil on canvas
- Dimensions: 77.5 x 71.8 cm
- Location: Wadsworth Atheneum
- Accession: 2014.4.1

Self-Portrait as a Lute Player is one of many self-portrait paintings made by the Italian baroque artist Artemisia Gentileschi. It was created between 1615 and 1617 for the Medici family in Florence. Today, it hangs in the Wadsworth Atheneum Museum of Art, Hartford, Connecticut, US. It shows the artist posing as a lute player looking directly at the audience. The painting has symbolism in the headscarf and outfit that portray Gentileschi in a costume that resembles a Romani woman. Self-Portrait as a Lute Player has been interpreted as Gentileschi portraying herself as a knowledgeable musician, a self portrayal as a prostitute, and as a fictive expression of one aspect of her identity.

== History ==
=== Artist ===
In Italy during the Baroque period, Artemisia Gentileschi was taught how to paint by her father, Orazio Gentileschi. Her father was a follower of Caravaggio, and Gentileschi was inspired by Caravaggian works as well. Self-Portrait as a Lute Player illustrates how she incorporates Caravaggesque elements of dramatic light, dark contrasting tones, and a vivid depiction of reality in her artwork. Self-portraits as allegorical paintings, other people, or as herself make up over two thirds of her known artworks. The Self-Portrait as a Lute Player was created after Gentileschi was married and moved from Rome to Florence after a fourteen-month rape trial against Agostino Tassi. Self-Portrait as a Lute Player and other self-portraits of Gentileschi were painted for private collections and allowed her to express her wit and cultural knowledge.

=== Patron ===
The Medici were a wealthy Italian family that started as bankers and moved their way into royal positions. They played an important role in funding the aristocratic development of artists and supported Gentileschi's entry into the male-dominated Accademia del Disegno. Self-portrait as a Lute Player is believed to have been painted for a member of the Medici family in Florence, based on a 1638 inventory of Villa Medici in Artimino. The painting was listed as a “portrait of Gentileschi playing a lute by her own hand.” The time period and connection to the Medici may mean the painting was commissioned by the Grand Duke Cosimo II. From 1638, its provenance is unknown until it was sold at Sotheby's London in 1998. Today, it hangs in the Wadsworth Atheneum Museum of Art, Hartford, Connecticut, US.

== Description ==
The painting is 30 ½ inches by 28 ¼ inches (77.5 x 71.8 cm), matching the size described by the Medici’s inventory. The key features of Gentileschi that align this painting with being her self-portrait are the textured chestnut hair, high forehead, elevated cheekbones, bumpy nose ridge, arched eyebrows, pressed lips, and almond shaped eyes. She is displayed from the waist up, with her body facing towards the right and her head tilted left toward the audience. A solid black background sits behind her highlighted figure that appears as if she is illuminated with a spotlight. Gentileschi depicts herself playing a lute, but instead of it being pressed parallel to her torso, she turns it in the same direction she turns her face, making it more visible for the audience. The accurate depiction of the lute as well as the finger positioning has led historians to believe that the artist had first-hand experience with the instrument. In this portrait, she is wearing a white cloth stitched with gold thread wrapped around her head. Her hair slips out of the front and left side of it. Her cheeks are pinker than the rest of her face and she looks straight at the viewer. Direct eye contact with the viewer was a common feature of self-portraits, and this painting is no exception. Gentileschi is wearing a baggy layered outfit with a white top under a blue one. The blue top has gold thread sewn into patterned designs, similar to the patterns on the white turban. All of the fabric has many painted folds that come in and out of shadow. Gentileschi's tendency to paint portraits of herself in costumes under the guise of another identity makes it difficult to know how many self-portraits of herself exist.

== Symbolism ==
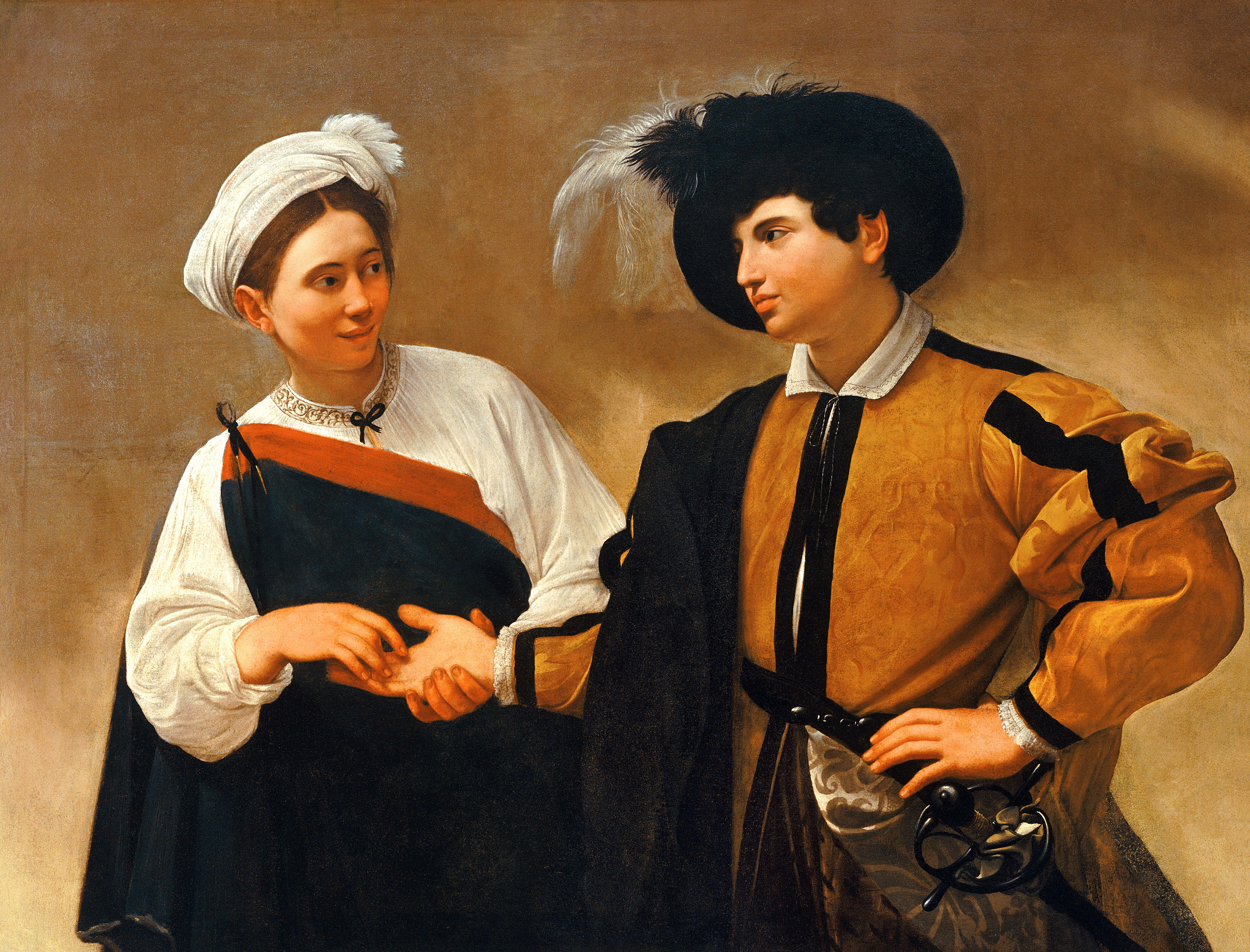
Caravaggio, The Fortune Teller, 1593-94, Pinacoteca Capitolina, Rome

Unlike other artists self-portraits of the time, Self-portrait as a Lute Player does not have direct symbolism connecting Gentileschi to being a painter, nor does it reflect her social status. Mary Garrard suggests the turban on her head could be a connection to a portrait drawing of Michelangelo wearing a similar headpiece. This drawing uses the turban to depict Renaissance artist classification, in Michelangelo's case, as a sculptor. It was located in Casa Buonarroti and was accessible for Gentileschi to see, so the turban may be an indirect symbol of artistry.

Gentileschi depicts herself in the guise of a Romani musician, denoted by the headscarf and low-cut blouse; this style of entertainers would have appeared at Italian court performances. The headscarf is similar to one Caravaggio painted in The Fortune Teller and Gentileschi's dress aligns with other paintings of Romani people from this time. Garrard explains Romani musicians were popular figures depicted in theater and they often represented music as "food of love."

The Self-portrait as a Lute Player depicts Gentileschi as a Romani musician, but the typical portrayal of a Romani women deceiving someone else in the painting is missing. According to Locker, painters had a reputation of being deceivers by profession since they created works of art that tricked the viewers into believing what they saw painted was a reality. Garrard furthers this idea by stating Gentileschi was called a benevolent sorceress by a poet. The lack of a fooled person in the art and the eye contact with the viewer imply the person being fooled is the audience.

== Interpretations ==
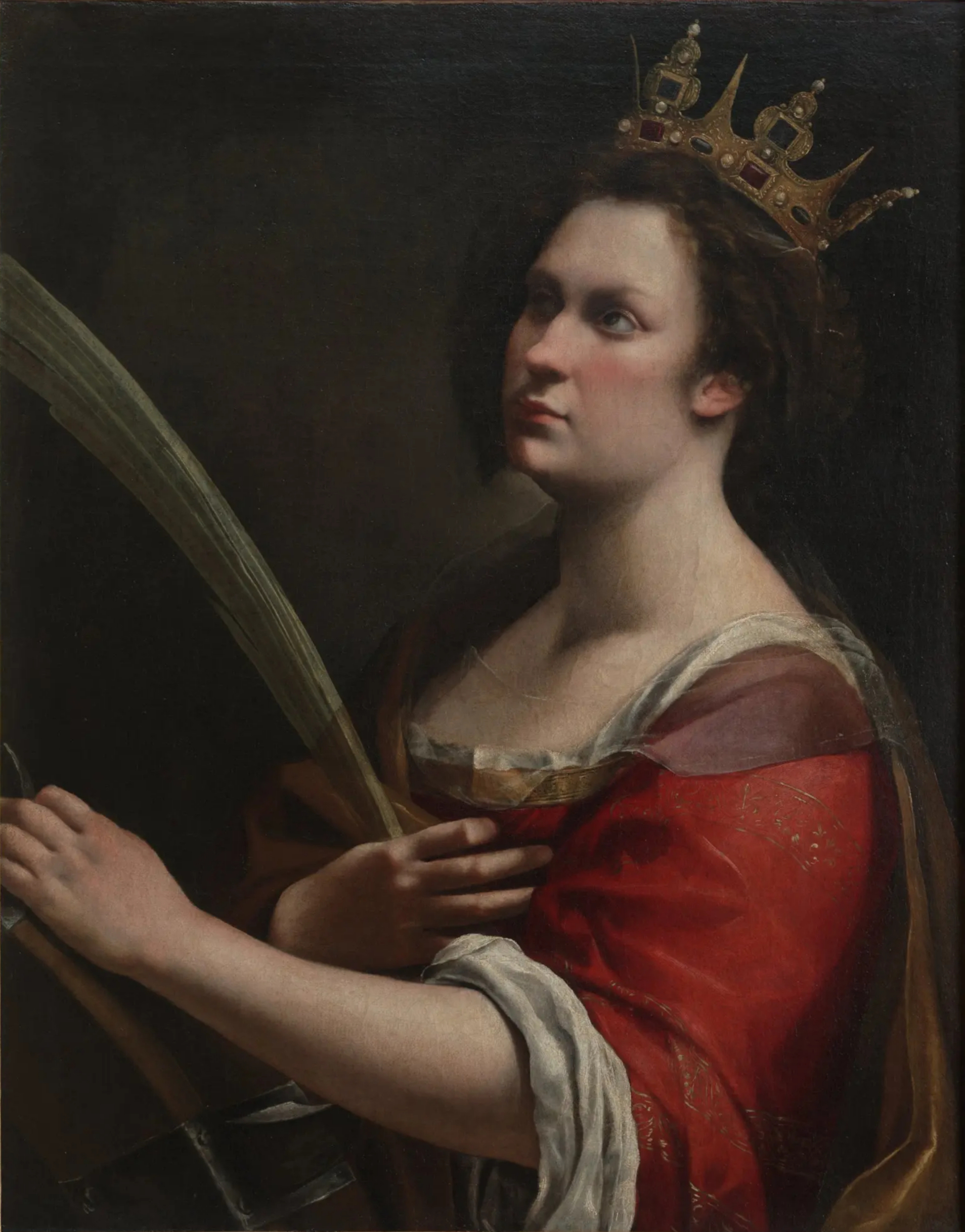
Artemisia Gentileschi, St Catherine of Alexandria, c. 1614–15, oil on canvas, 77 x 62 cm. Gallerie degli Uffizi, Florence.

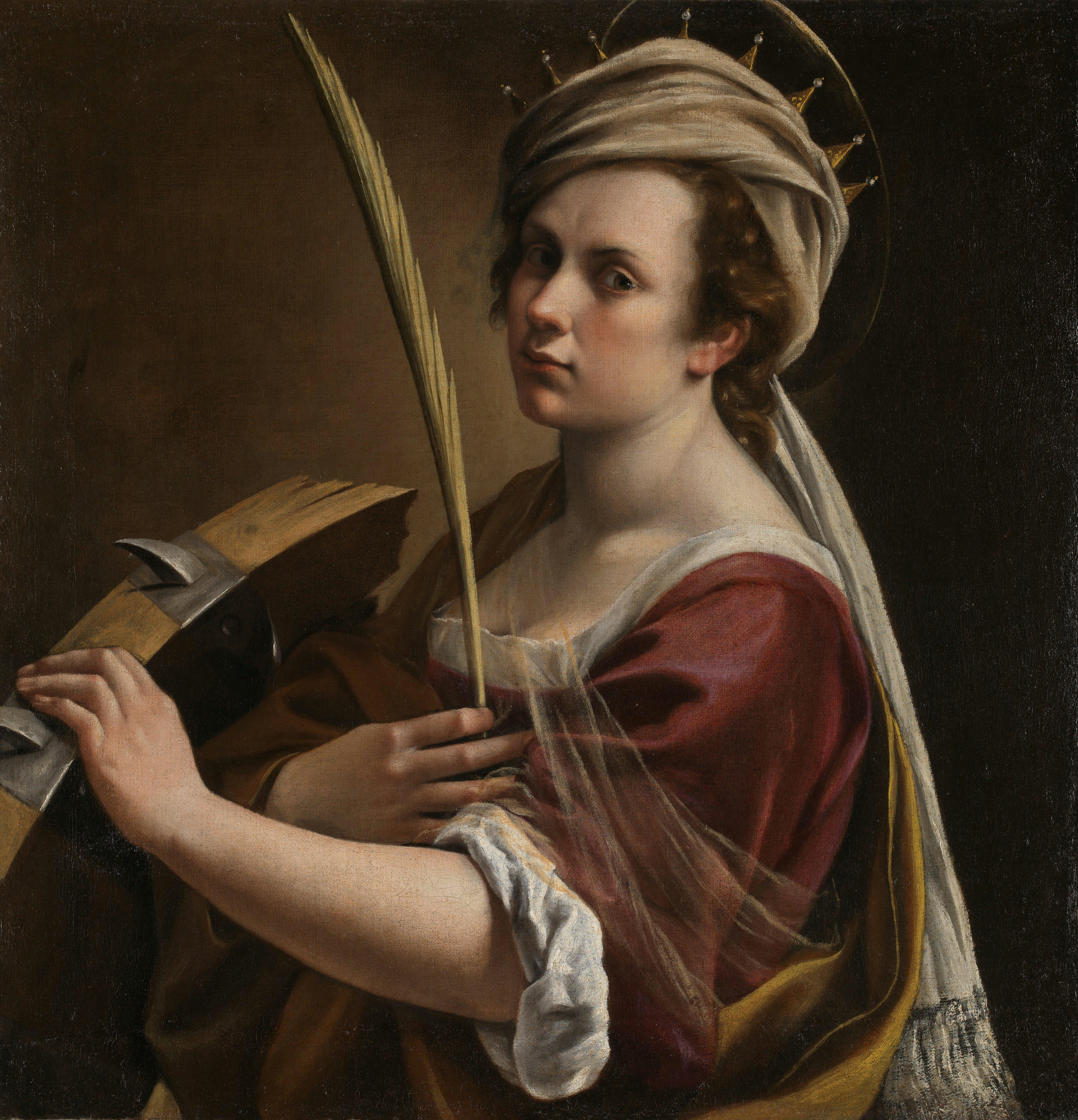
Artemisia Gentileschi, Self-portrait as St Catherine of Alexandria, c. 1615, oil on canvas, 71 x 71 cm. The National Gallery, London

It is possible that this painting is related to the events of the Ballo delle Zingare, a performance of the Dance of the Romani Women recorded by Cesare Tinghi, the Medici court recorder. He described the Romani costumes to have luxurious gold and silver threads, similar to the ones painted in Gentileschi's over gown and headdress. The fabric would be easily identified as quality material by Florentine audiences and it was used in these performances to reflect light and add awe to the movement heavy spectacle. Painters, composers, librettists, and dancers were known to participate in court performances during this time, and the record of the event indicates a “Sig.ra Artimisia,” assumed to be Gentileschi, sang as a Romani in the performance. Her attendance in the performance and the quality of the fabric painted further align Gentileschi with painting herself as a character in the event.

Portraying herself as a musician could be an indication that Gentileschi was aligning herself with other famous women artists such as Sofonisba Anguissola and Lavina Fontana. These woman also made self-portraits showcasing themselves playing instruments to demonstrate their knowledge and virtuous characters. However, Gentileschi was known for singing, not for playing the lute.

Gentileschi’s use of rosy cheeks and a low neckline outfit that highlights her breasts gives the painting a sexual connotation that the previous women did not depict, making this the first known portrait of a woman expressing her sexual appeal. Judith Mann entertains the idea that this costume indicates Gentileschi depicting herself as a prostitute in a self confessional way similar to what Rembrandt did in some of his paintings. Locker argues the lengths the Gentileschi family went to clear their name from her rape trial makes it unlikely that she would depict herself as such. Garrard suggests Gentileschi is playing dress up and is temporarily assigning herself a different identity to expand aspects of her own identity in a safe way. She disguises her many self expressions in her fictive paintings to avoid being assigned any single role of feminine identity constructed by men.

The composition is closely related to two other contemporaneous depictions of Saint Catherine of Alexandria, which suggests that the artist was using her self-portraits as a means of establishing her reputation in Florence. Saint Catherine of Alexandria was a popular saint in Florence, and Gentileschi made many portraits and self-portraits of herself as the saint. It is suspected that Saint Catherine was popular because of her correlation to the sister of Duke Cosimo II, Caterina de' Medici. The Self Portrait as a Lute Player shares compositional similarities to Gentileschi's self-portraits as Saint Catherine of Alexandria in the Uffizi and in London, such as the positioning of the bodies, the angle of her head, and the use of the head turban. Since the three of these paintings are of similar sizes, date to a similar time period, and are close to identical in pose, it is likely Gentileschi reused the same outline for all three. This idea is further supported with an X-ray taken of the Uffizi Saint Catherine of Alexandria that shows Gentileschi painted over a sketch of a figure identical to the London Self-portrait as Saint Catherine of Alexandria. The near-identical composition of these three paintings illustrates a feminist approach to deconstructing female identities fashioned by men, by likening the sexualized Romani musician to Saint Catherine.

== Provenance ==
This painting was sold by Sotheby's, London, 9 July 1998, lot 68. It was offered for sale by Christie's New York on 29 January 2014, but bidding on lot 36 with estimate $3-5 million stopped at $2.0 million and it failed to sell. It had previously been on loan by Myron Kunin of Curtis Galleries to the Minneapolis Institute of Art from 2002-2013. In February 2014 it was purchased by the newly formed $9.6 million bequest of Charles H. Schwartz for the collection of the Wadsworth Atheneum. It was subsequently lent to the travelling 'Artemisia' exhibition to the National Gallery, London in 2020.

== See also ==
- Self-portraiture
- List of works by Artemisia Gentileschi
