= Mary Magdalene in Ecstasy =

Painting by Artemisia Gentileschi

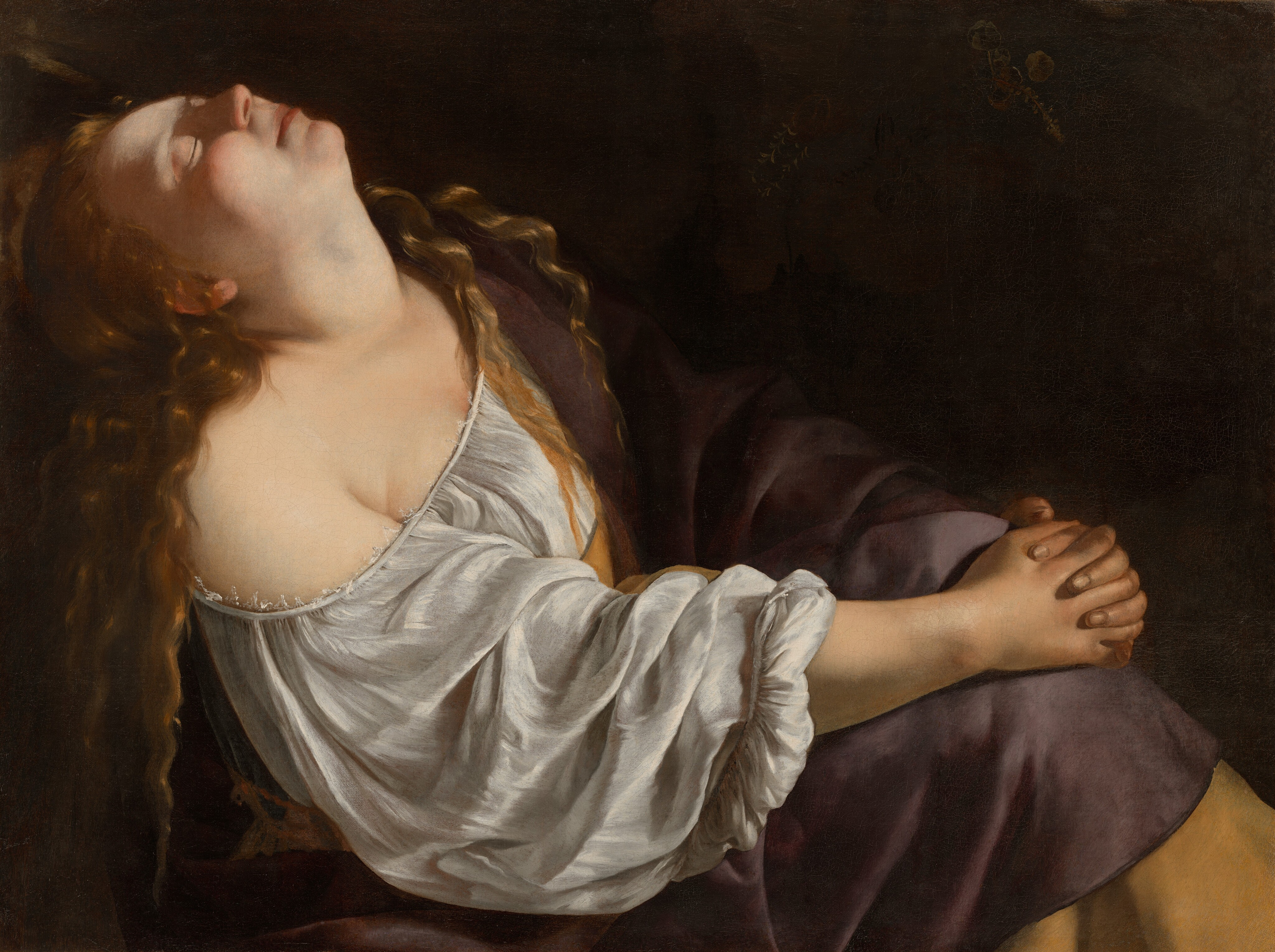
- Artist: Artemisia Gentileschi
- Year: c. 1620-5
- Medium: Oil on canvas
- Dimensions: 81 cm × 105 cm (32 in × 41 in)
- Location: National Gallery of Art, Washington, D.C.

Mary Magdalene in Ecstasy is a painting by the Italian baroque artist Artemisia Gentileschi. It is in the collection of the National Gallery of Art in Washington, D.C.

== Description ==
A woman is shown in a seated position, with her head leaning back and hands clasped around her knee. She wears a purple and ochre gown over a lace-trimmed white chemise. As she leans back, her wavy blond hair cascades behind her and the chemise has slipped down to expose her right shoulder. Her eyes are closed as she sits in a darkened landscape, strongly illuminated by a light source from the right of the painting.

== Gentileschi's interpretation ==
This is one of many paintings of the Magdalene by Gentileschi, but the depiction is unusual for the period. A 2020 exhibition catalogue notes that "Mary Magdalene is more usually shown penitent in a landscape ... [here] she is passionately alive and in the throes of ecstatic rapture". The connection to Caravaggio's Mary Magdalen in Ecstasy has been noted. Both artists show more of Mary Magdalene's flesh and shoulder than versions by others, lending an erotic charge to the devotional scene. Other symbols that were typically used to demonstrate her repentance—skull, candle, ointment jar—are absent, leading art historians to focus on the more sensual feel of the painting in their identification and attribution.

== Provenance ==
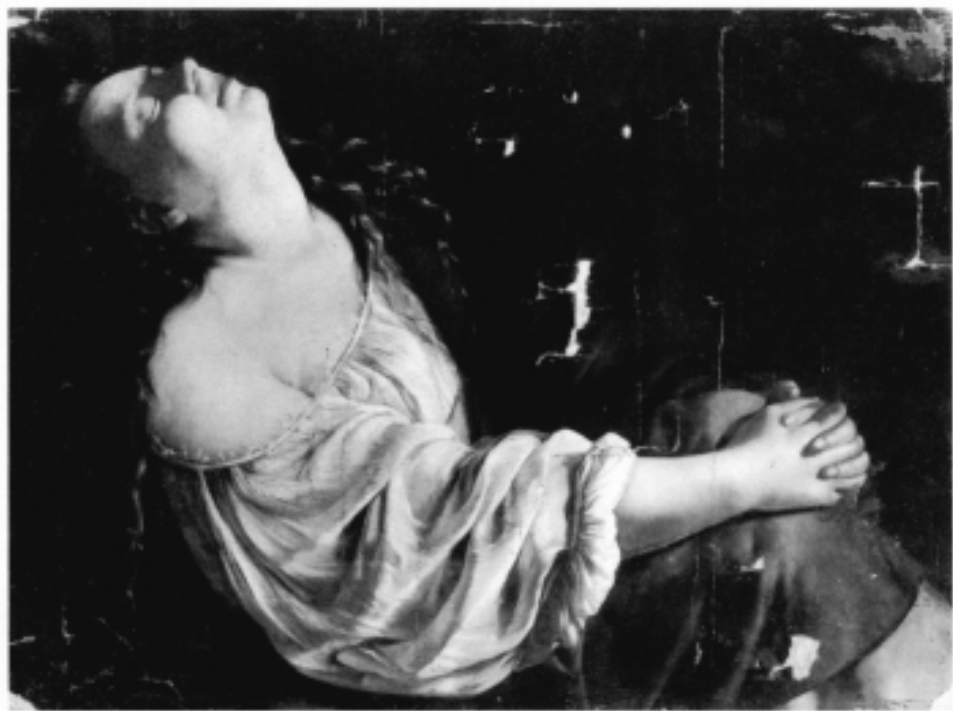
Photo on which Gianni Papi based his 2011 attribution.

The painting was virtually unknown until a 2011 article identified it based on an old photograph. Research then confirmed it had once been held in a private French collection. In 2014, the painting was sold in Paris for €865,000, (Note: About €1,063,000 today, indexed by general consumer prices rather than the art market and about US$1.15 million at the time,) more than €600,000 above Sotheby's estimated price – a record price at the time for a work by Gentileschi. (Note: That record was broken in 2018 with the sale of her Self-Portrait as Saint Catherine of Alexandria.)

On 4 February 2026, the National Gallery of Art announced that they had acquired the work for their permanent collection, describing it as "defining artwork by one of the 17th century's most celebrated artists".

There is no precise date for the painting; the first half of the 1620s has been suggested.

== See also ==
- List of works by Artemisia Gentileschi
