= Saint Catherine of Alexandria (Artemisia Gentileschi, Florence) =

Painting by Artemisia Gentileschi

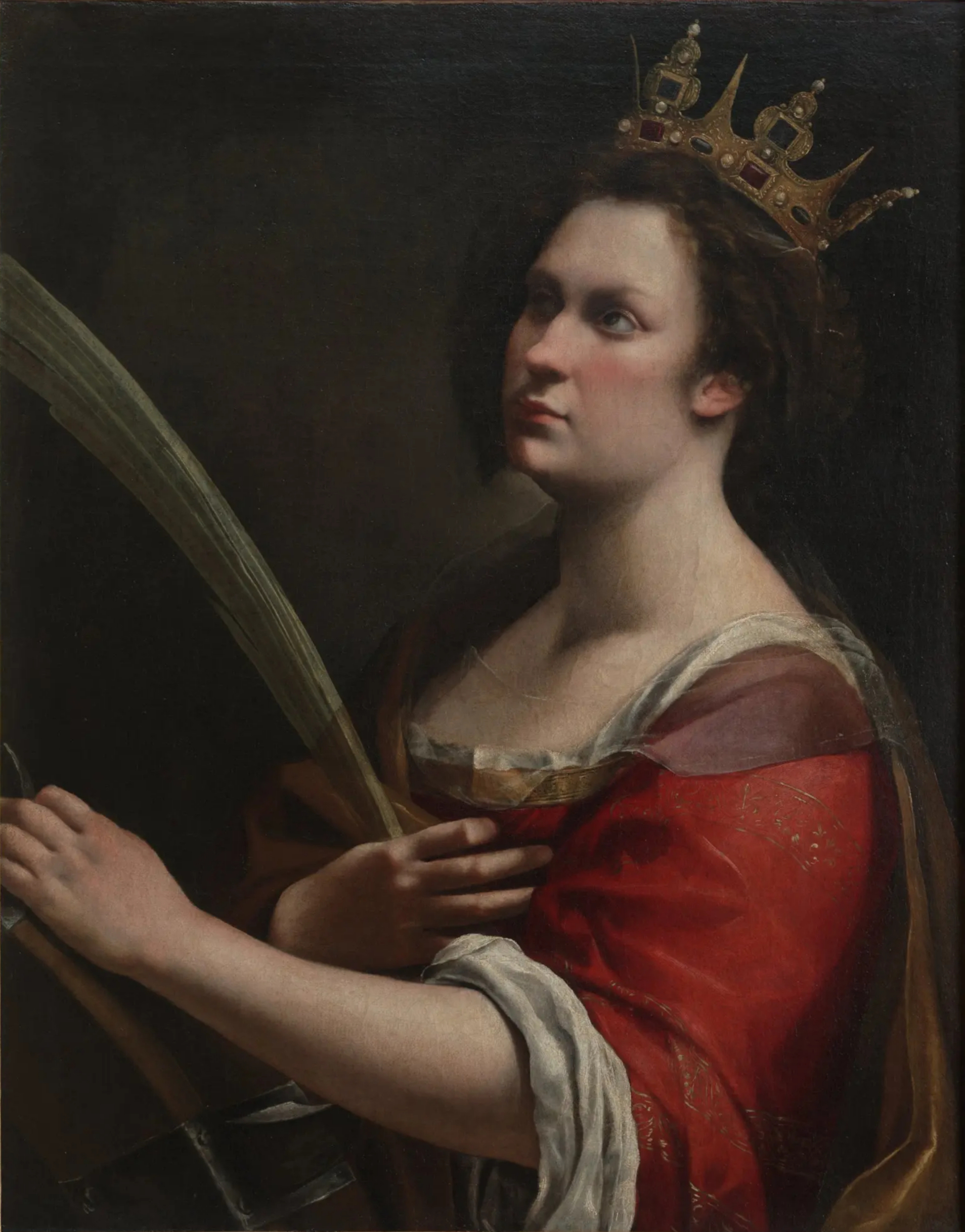
- Artist: Artemisia Gentileschi
- Year: c. 1615–1617
- Medium: Oil on canvas
- Dimensions: 78 cm × 61.5 cm (31 in × 24.2 in)
- Location: Uffizi, Florence

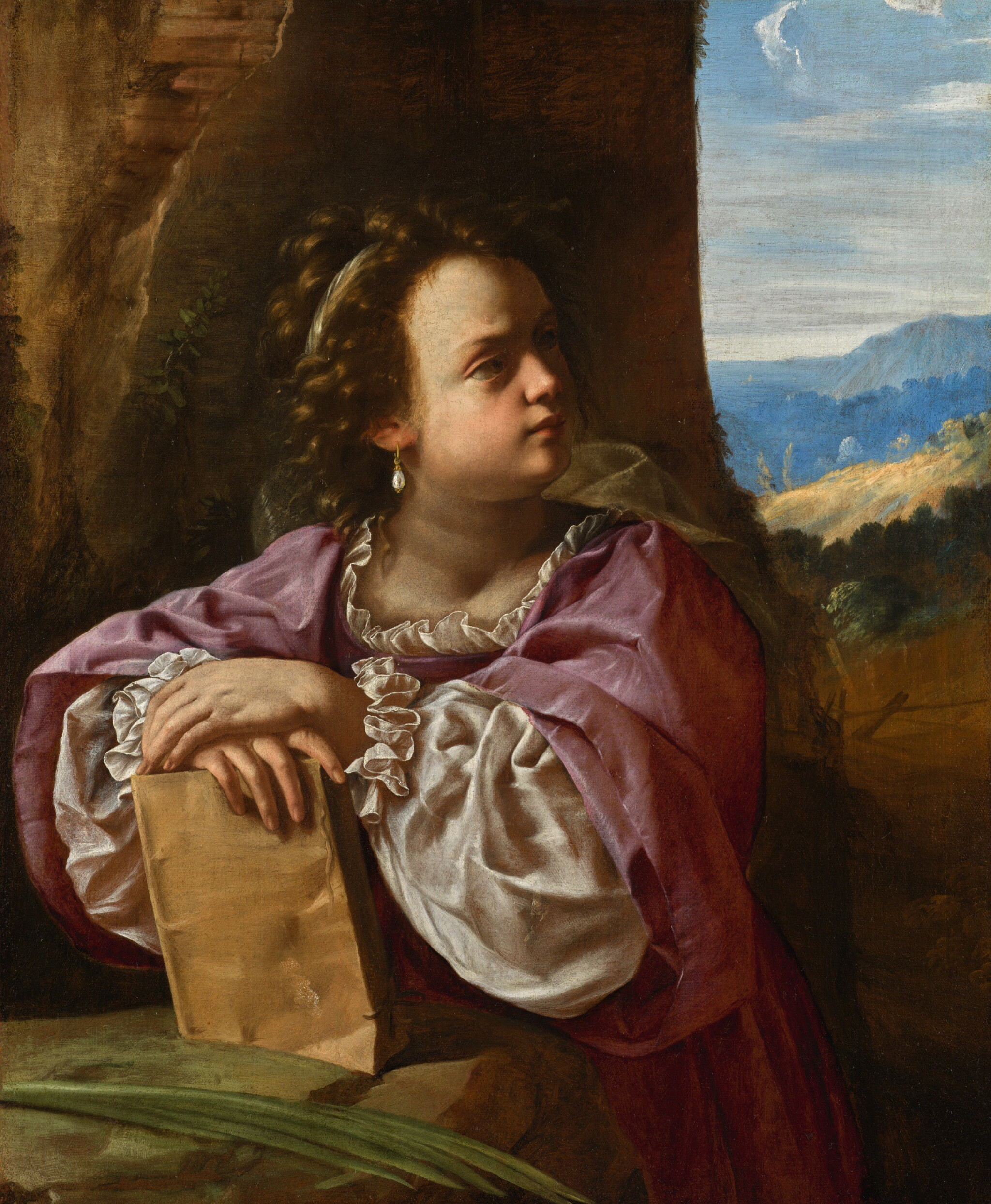
Artemisia Gentileschi, Saint Catherine of Alexandria (circa 1627–1635), Nationalmuseum.

Saint Catherine of Alexandria is a painting by the Italian Baroque artist Artemisia Gentileschi. It is in the collection of the Uffizi, Florence. Gentileschi likely used the same cartoon or preparatory drawing to create both this painting and the Self-Portrait as Saint Catherine of Alexandria (1615–1617), now in the National Gallery, London.

== Subject Matter ==
The painting is a representation of Catherine, the daughter of King Costus of Alexandria, who defied the emperor Maxentius with her staunch defense of her Christian faith. She was sentenced to death by use of a spiked wheel, but was saved when the instrument miraculously broke. She was subsequently beheaded and later recognized as a Christian martyr, with the broken spiked wheel as her symbol. She is portrayed in a striking red gown with gold embellishment, holding the martyr's palm frond and wearing an elaborate gem-encrusted crown.

== History ==
=== Provenance ===
While there is no clear evidence to identify a date for this painting, art historians believe it was created during the artist's time in Florence, when Caterina de' Medici was in residence. Depictions of a saint renowned for her beauty and modesty became very popular in Florence during this period, as artists sought patronage from the Medici court. Researchers have further observed the similarity between the image of the martyr's crown and one made for Ferdinand I de' Medici. By 1683, the painting was documented as being in the Medici collection at Villa Artimino, in the Apartment of the Courtly Ladies. By 1890, the painting was in the collection of the Galleria dell'Accademia.

=== Restoration ===
A significant campaign of restoration was completed in 1966, which recovered a painting once believed to be too fragile for public display. The painting suffered further damage from the 1993 bombing near the Uffizi, which was subsequently restored.

=== Scientific Analysis ===
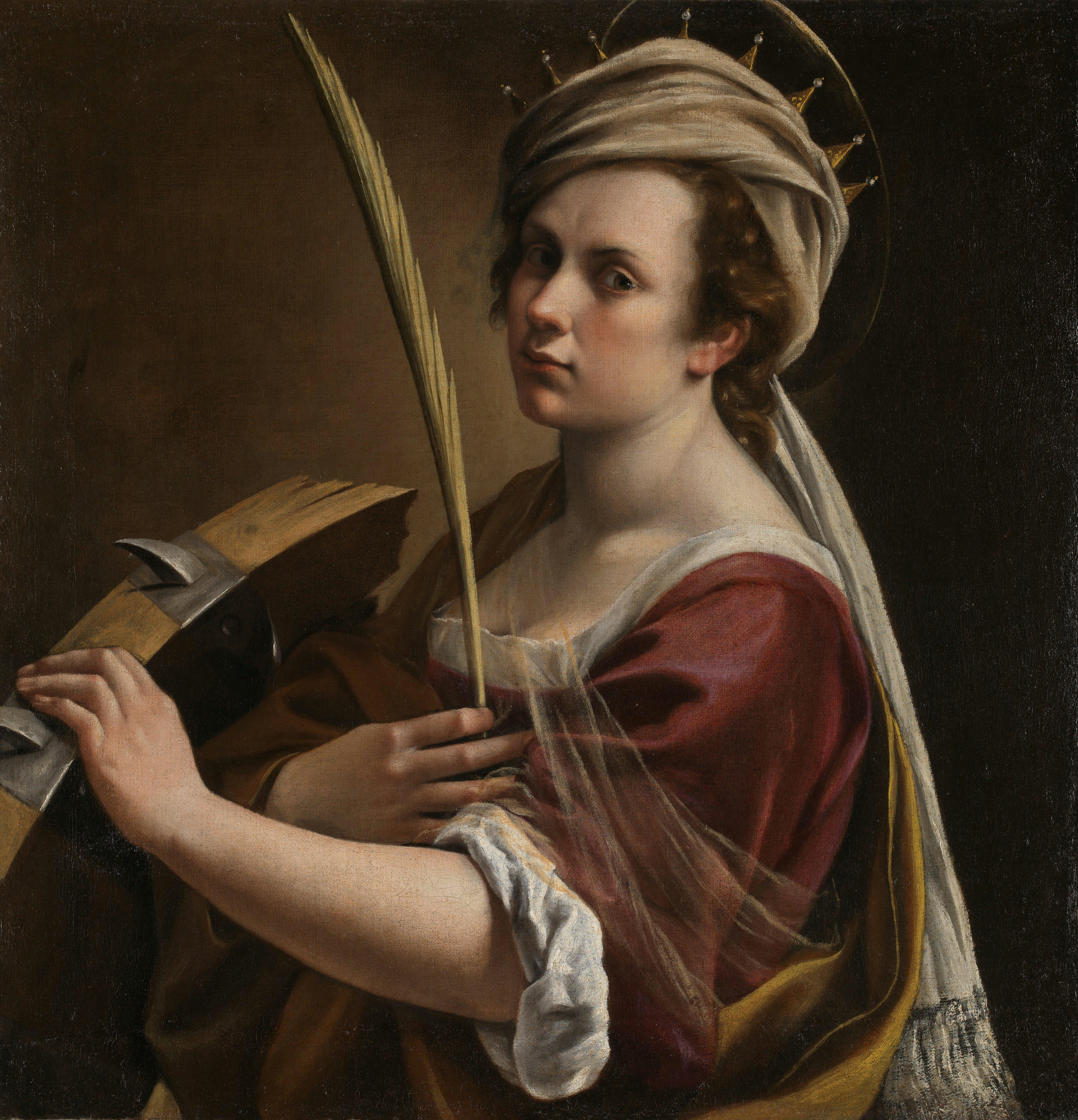
Artemisia Gentileschi – Self-Portrait 5365

In 2019, this painting was examined by conservators in the Opificio delle Pietre Dure in Florence. Infrared, ultraviolet, and x-ray studies demonstrated that Gentileschi changed the composition while she was in the middle of painting it. The underpainting reveals a female head wearing a turban, oriented towards the viewer. This differs from Gentileschi's final composition in which Saint Catherine wears a crown and looks up towards heaven. Tracings from the National Gallery's Self-Portrait as Saint Catherine of Alexandria were compared to this underpainting and the study concluded that Gentileschi used the same cartoon or preparatory drawings for both of these images. This conclusion provides evidence that Gentileschi used herself as a model when painting images of female martyrs. In addition, the x-rays revealed a third face that was completely painted over in the final version. This was likely an initial sketch for an unrealized work of art, demonstrating that Gentileschi reused her canvases. The final painted image is thought to represent a real person, according to art historians, and may depict Caterina de' Medici, Maria Maddalena of Austria or the artist herself.

== See also ==
- List of works by Artemisia Gentileschi
