= Self-Portrait as the Allegory of Painting =

1630s painting by Artemisia Gentileschi

- Autoritratto in veste di Pittura (Italian)
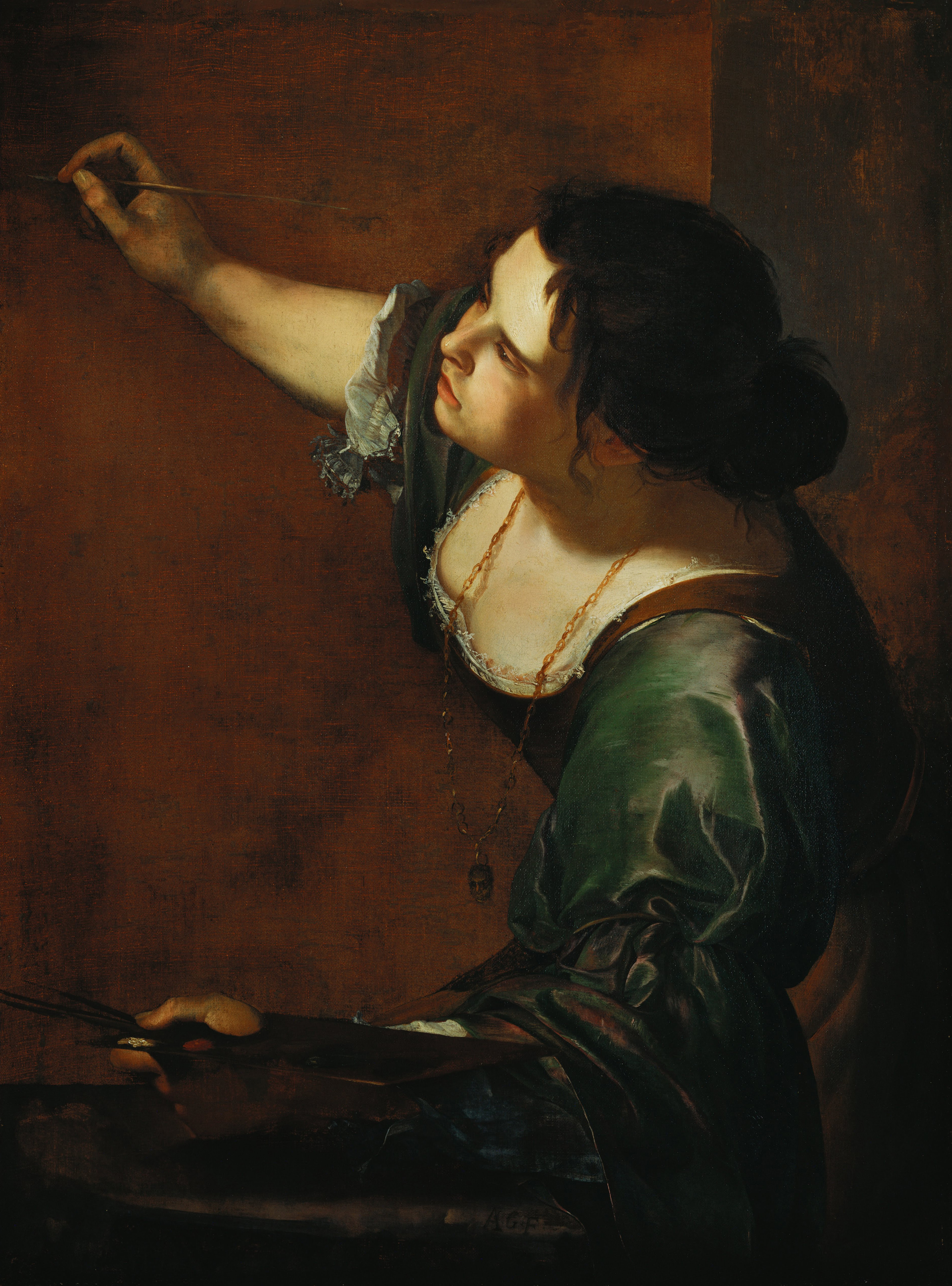
- Artist: Artemisia Gentileschi
- Year: 1638–39
- Medium: Oil on canvas
- Dimensions: 98.6 cm × 75.2 cm (38.8 in × 29.6 in)
- Owner: Royal Collection
- Accession: RCIN 405551

Self-Portrait as the Allegory of Painting, also known as Autoritratto in veste di Pittura or simply La Pittura, was painted by the Italian Baroque artist Artemisia Gentileschi. The oil-on-canvas painting measures 98.6 by 75.2 centimetres (38.8 in × 29.6 in) and was probably produced during Gentileschi's stay in England between 1638 and 1639. It was in the collection of Charles I and was returned to the Royal Collection at the Restoration (1660) and remains there. In 2015 it was put on display in the "Cumberland Gallery" in Hampton Court Palace.

The scene depicts Gentileschi painting herself, who is in turn represented as the “Allegory of Painting” illustrated by Cesare Ripa. It is now in the British Royal Collection.

The painting demonstrates rare feminist themes from a time when women seldom held jobs, let alone were well known for them. Gentileschi's portrayal of herself as the epitome of the arts was a bold statement to make for the period, though the painting is today overshadowed by many of Gentileschi's other, more dramatic and raw scenes reflecting the artist's troubling younger years.

That it is a self-portrait as well as an allegory was first proposed by Michael Levey in the 20th century, and is not universally accepted, as some art historians see the features of the figure here as too different from those in other portraits of the artist.

== Historical context ==
Gentileschi was born in Rome in 1593, just at the start of Baroque painting. Gentileschi's father, Orazio, was a well-known artist, and Artemisia trained in his workshop for a number of years before creating works herself. In the 1610s, Artemisia was raped by an older member of the workshop, Agostino Tassi, an event which coloured the rest of her life and is reflected in her art, which often shows subjects with a "Power of Women" themes such as Judith Slaying Holofernes and Salome with the Head of St. John the Baptist. The artist's focus on her work, away from the viewer, highlights the drama of the Baroque period, and the changing role of the artist from craftsperson to singular innovator.

Abstract concepts like "Painting" were traditionally represented by female allegorical figures, and therefore the painting was not one that any male painter could present in the same way, as both self-portrait and allegory. The Self-Portrait was also influenced by the works of Cesare Ripa, most notably his Iconologia, in which he suggests how virtues and abstract concepts should be depicted, with human qualities and appearances. Ripa said "Painting" should be shown as: “A beautiful woman, with full black hair, disheveled, and twisted in various ways, with arched eyebrows that show imaginative thought, the mouth covered with a cloth tied behind her ears, with a chain of gold at her throat from which hangs a mask, and has written in front "imitation." She holds in her hand a brush, and in the other the palette, with clothes of evanescently covered drapery.” Other than the cloth tied around the mouth, Gentileschi follows this prescription quite accurately.

== Description ==
The composition of the painting mirrors other artworks of the time, using diagonal lines to flaunt the female figure and emphasize her movement both in toward the canvas and out towards the viewers. The use of foreshortening and other three-dimensional techniques not only demonstrate Gentileschi’s talent as an artist, but also bring the viewers into the painting on physical and emotional levels.

The light is clearly coming from the left, but the source is not visible and is unusually harsh. The front of Gentileschi’s body is lit perfectly, but her back is obscured. Across the forehead and cheeks and down the side of the neck and left shoulder a clear line separates the light from the dark, a chiaroscuro technique which was used frequently during the Baroque era to add a sense of drama.

The textural element, so important in Baroque paintings, is found in the wisps in the disheveled hair, the crinkles in the sleeve with spilled paint cracking near the wrist, and the dirty hands, which augment the painting's realism.

Finally, the colour in the portrait is noteworthy, partially due to the lighting and partially due to the natural difference in tones. Whereas the darker clothing and background nearly seem to blend together, the pale skin of the face and right arm jump out immediately. The gold chain near the neck shimmers, while the chain near the chest (ending in a mask pendant) slowly dies down into a lacklustre brown. The thinness of the painting in the background gives the impression that the painting is unfinished, however a 1972 cleaning removed later overpainting to restore it to its earlier condition. The artist's initials are placed below the palette.

== Interpretation ==
Because Ripa’s image of “Painting” took the form of a woman, Gentileschi could use the description to her advantage to paint herself in the best light as an artist. While being a female during the Baroque era was largely negative in terms of rights and lifestyle, Gentileschi found this gem in Iconologia to amp up her reputation. Additionally, although many of the idealized figures of women evoked salacious or suggestive ideas during this time, Gentileschi was able to successfully manipulate “Painting” to be empowering (not demeaning) to women.

Gentileschi's depiction of herself as the Allegory of Painting has made her seem somewhat egotistical to some critics. Furthermore, as art historian Mary Garrard claims, only a woman artist could present herself in this way, as allegorical personifications were limited to female figures.

== Provenance ==
The painting was created during Artemisia's trip to England and was subsequently acquired by King Charles I. During the dispersal of the royal collection, it came into the hands of John Jackson, a lawyer employed by Parliamentary creditors, as noted by a record from October 1651. The painting was reacquired for King Charles II by royalist Colonel William Hawley, during his post-Restoration campaign authorised by royal proclamation in August 1660.

== See also ==
- List of works by Artemisia Gentileschi
