= Casket with Scenes of Romances =

French Gothic ivory casket

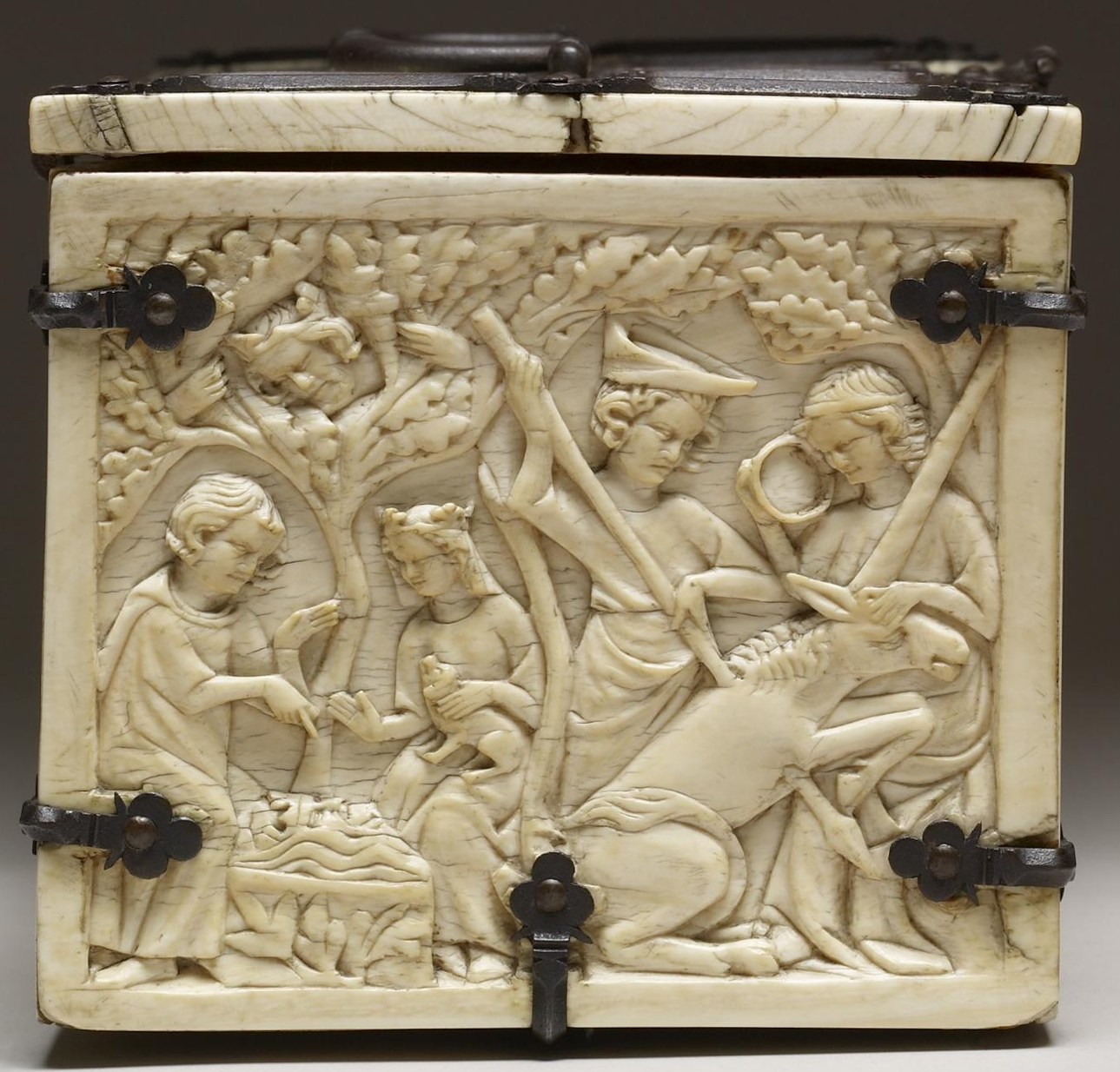
End, with Tristan and Isolde talking, watched by King Mark in a tree, and a wounded unicorn

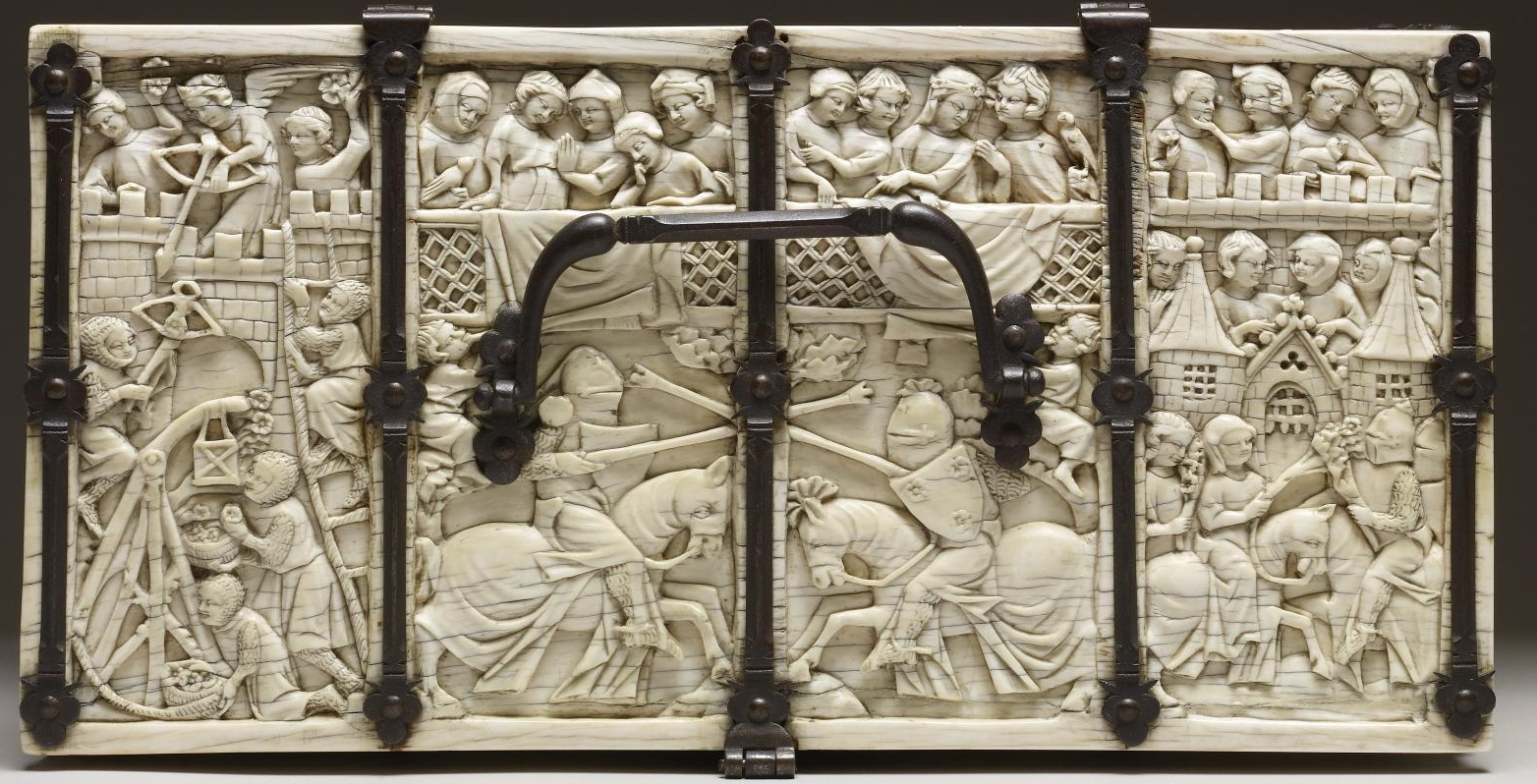
Lid, with the Siege of the Castle of Love at left, and jousting.

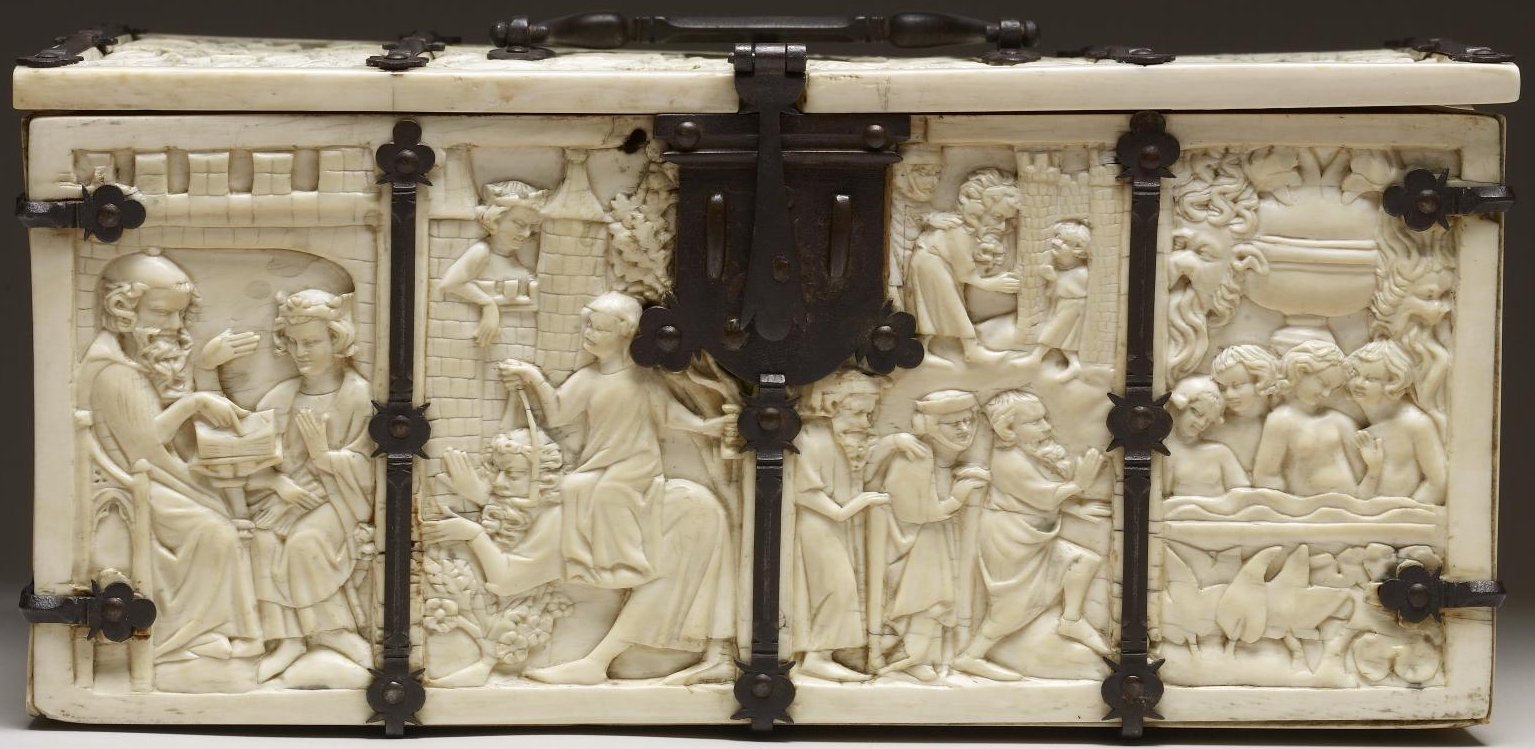
Front side including, from left: Aristotle teaching Alexander the Great, Phyllis riding Aristotle, watched by Alexander from a window, and at the right, old people arriving at the Fountain of Youth, and young naked people in it

The object called by the museum Casket with Scenes of Romances (catalogued as Walters 71264) is a French Gothic ivory casket made in Paris between 1330 and 1350, and now in the Walters Art Museum, Baltimore, Maryland. The casket is 4 5/8 inches high, 9 15/16 inches wide and 5 1/16 inches deep (11.8 × 25.2 × 12.9 cm).

The casket is one of the relatively few surviving Gothic ivory caskets decorated with a variety of themes from courtly literature, called composite caskets for that reason. There are at least eight known surviving examples (and numerous fragments), of which two more are also discussed in this article: firstly a casket in the British Museum with an almost identical set of scenes, and one in the Cluny Museum in Paris, which shares many scenes, but diverges in others.

By this period, Paris was the main European centre of ivory carving, producing large numbers of religious and secular objects, including small diptychs with religious scenes that used the same relief technique; these and smaller secular objects such as mirror-cases are more common than these caskets, or larger religious statues like the Virgin and Child from the Sainte-Chapelle of the 1260s. The composite caskets differ slightly from each other, but are sufficiently similar to suggest they all originated from one Paris workshop, or group of workshops, around 1330 to 1350.

This casket may well have been a gift of courtship or upon marriage, and was probably intended for an aristocratic female owner, to keep her jewels and other valuables in. The carved scenes were possibly originally painted; as the paint on Gothic ivories tended to peel in places, it was very often removed by later dealers and collectors. The unusually large size of the piece allows a wide range of the repertoire of popular scenes from different literary sources in French Gothic art to be shown, which display a variety of medieval attitudes to love and the role of women: "Themes such as lust and chastity, folly and wisdom are juxtaposed in a series of non-connected scenes". Susan L. Smith has proposed that composite caskets express the power of love. The Walters casket is first recorded in England in 1757, and was bought by Henry Walters in 1923. The iron mounts are modern, probably 19th century.

== Iconography ==
The lid shows scenes of the Castle of love and knights jousting and the sides show other scenes from French medieval romances. The themes of the lid are related to the 13th-century Romance of the Rose by Guillaume de Lorris and Jean de Meung. The Siege of the Castle of Love (or "Assault on" etc.), at the left on the lid, is a fanciful scene of courtly romance, where knights attack a castle defended by ladies and a cupid, with both sides throwing roses as missiles. This subject does not, as is sometimes claimed, appear in the Roman de la Rose, and first appears in art not long before the date of the casket, as one of few secular scenes in the illuminated manuscript known as the Peterborough Psalter of 1299–1328. But such a scene was staged and acted out by "many gentlemen and twelve of the fairest and gayest ladies of Padua" as part of a festival at Treviso in 1214, a century earlier. In the center knights joust in front of ladies.

The scene at right has differing interpretations: either the victor, whose shield carried three roses, receives a bouquet of roses from a lady as prize, or, more likely, the tournament continues, now between the ladies, fighting with flowers, and the knights using "oak branches". This is the only scene on the lid that differs in the British Museum and Paris caskets, where the siege of the castle continues in the section at furthest right. A variation of this set of scenes has examples in the Cleveland Museum of Art, Detroit Institute of Arts, Château de Boulogne-sur-Mer, Walker Art Gallery and the Metropolitan Museum of Art: in the latter (17.190.173) there is an elopement scene at left, then the two central sections are the tournament, with the attack on the Castle of Love behind the elopement at left, and in the last section on the right.

The front of the casket has, from the left: Aristotle teaching Alexander the Great, Phyllis riding Aristotle, watched by Alexander from a window, and at the right, old people arriving at the Fountain of Youth, and young naked people in it. Phyllis riding Aristotle is the "quintessential image from the Power of Women topos", which was beginning its long career in art at this time. The Fountain of Youth is a regularly occurring scene, of Eastern origin, that shows old people being carried to a miraculous spring which immediately turns them into beautiful young people, one of the relatively few scenes in medieval art where figures are not just "naked" but "nude". All three scenes are the same in the British Museum casket, and the Walters also has a side from a French casket of similar date but less high-quality carving, showing the first two of these scenes, but changing the last (Walters 71196, shown below). The Walters also has mirror-cases with other examples of the Siege of the Castle of Love and the Fountain of Youth.

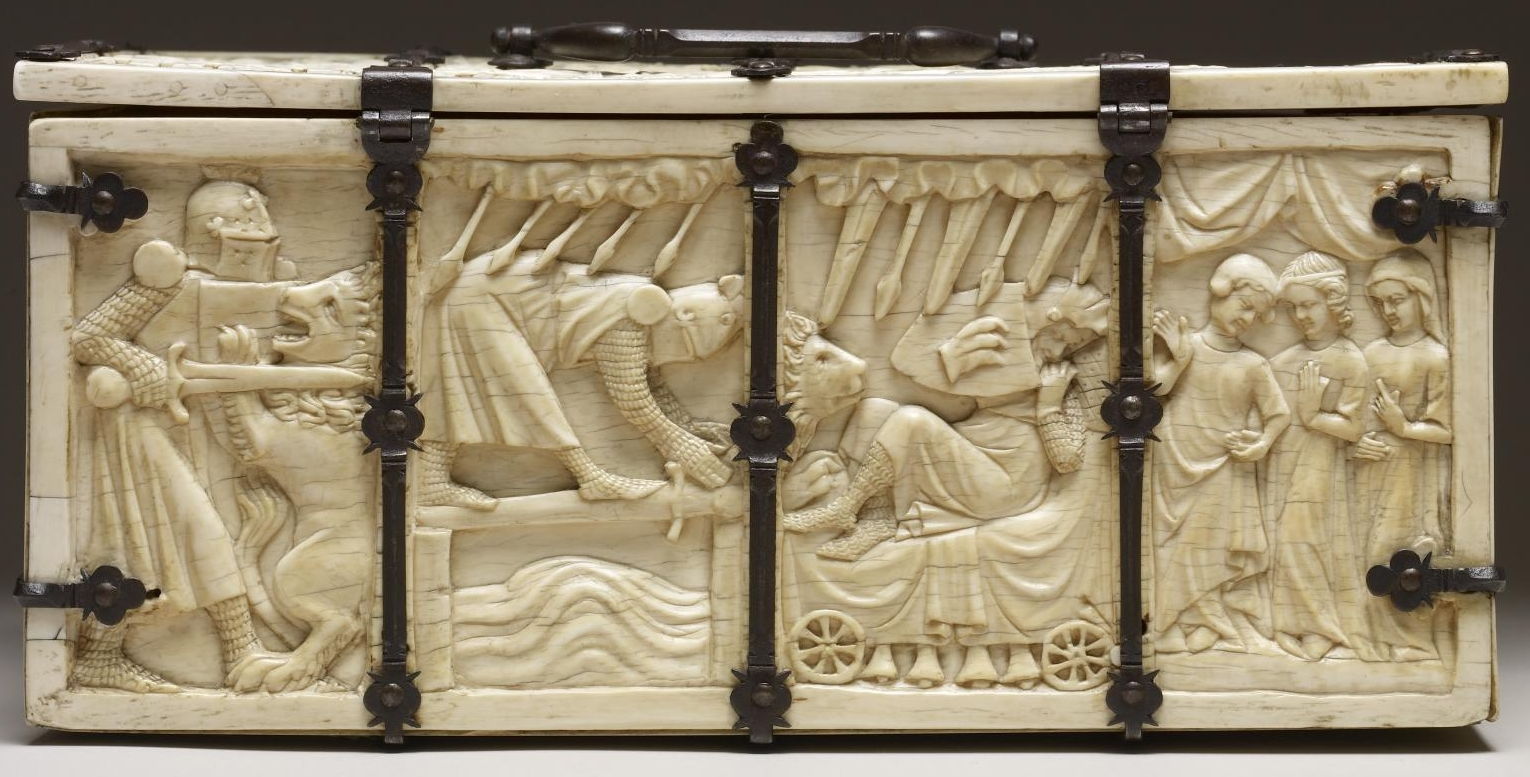
Walters, back side, with Arthurian scenes

The rear side of the casket contains scenes from Arthurian romance described in the Courtauld Institute database of Gothic ivories as: "Gawain in armour fighting the lion; Lancelot crossing the sword bridge, with spears falling from the sky; Gawain on the perilous bed; bed on wheels and with bells; lion; shield with a lion's paw; spears falling from the sky; the three maidens at the Château Merveil". The sword bridge features in Lancelot, the Knight of the Cart by Chrétien de Troyes, and the perilous bed in his Perceval, the Story of the Grail. Both the Walters and British Museum caskets have the same scenes and compositions here, which both depart from the literary sources by having the rain of swords falling not only on Gawain on the bed, but also on Lancelot on the bridge, suggesting that the ivory-carver's or designer's contact with the literature was indirect.

The two ends show other Arthurian scenes: the adulterous lovers Tristan and Iseult are spied upon by Iseult's husband King Mark of Cornwall, hiding in a tree; his face can be seen reflected in the pool below, which they see, enabling them to switch to innocent conversation. This end also has a scene with a wounded unicorn, a maiden and a man with holding a spear which has been run through the unicorn, in a version of the subject of The Hunt of the Unicorn where the maiden has been used to lure the unicorn to his death. The other end has a scene with Galahad.

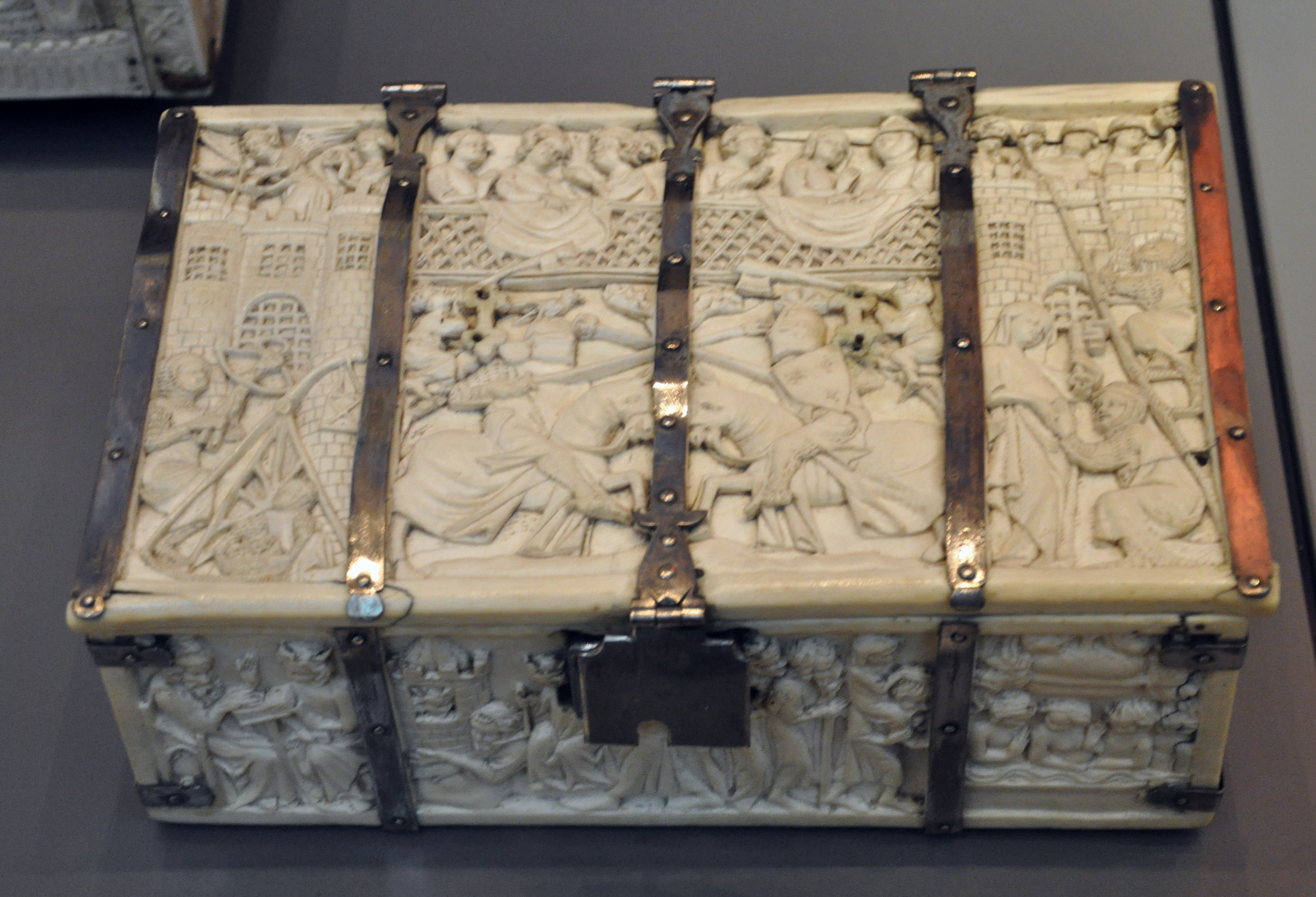
View of the British Museum casket

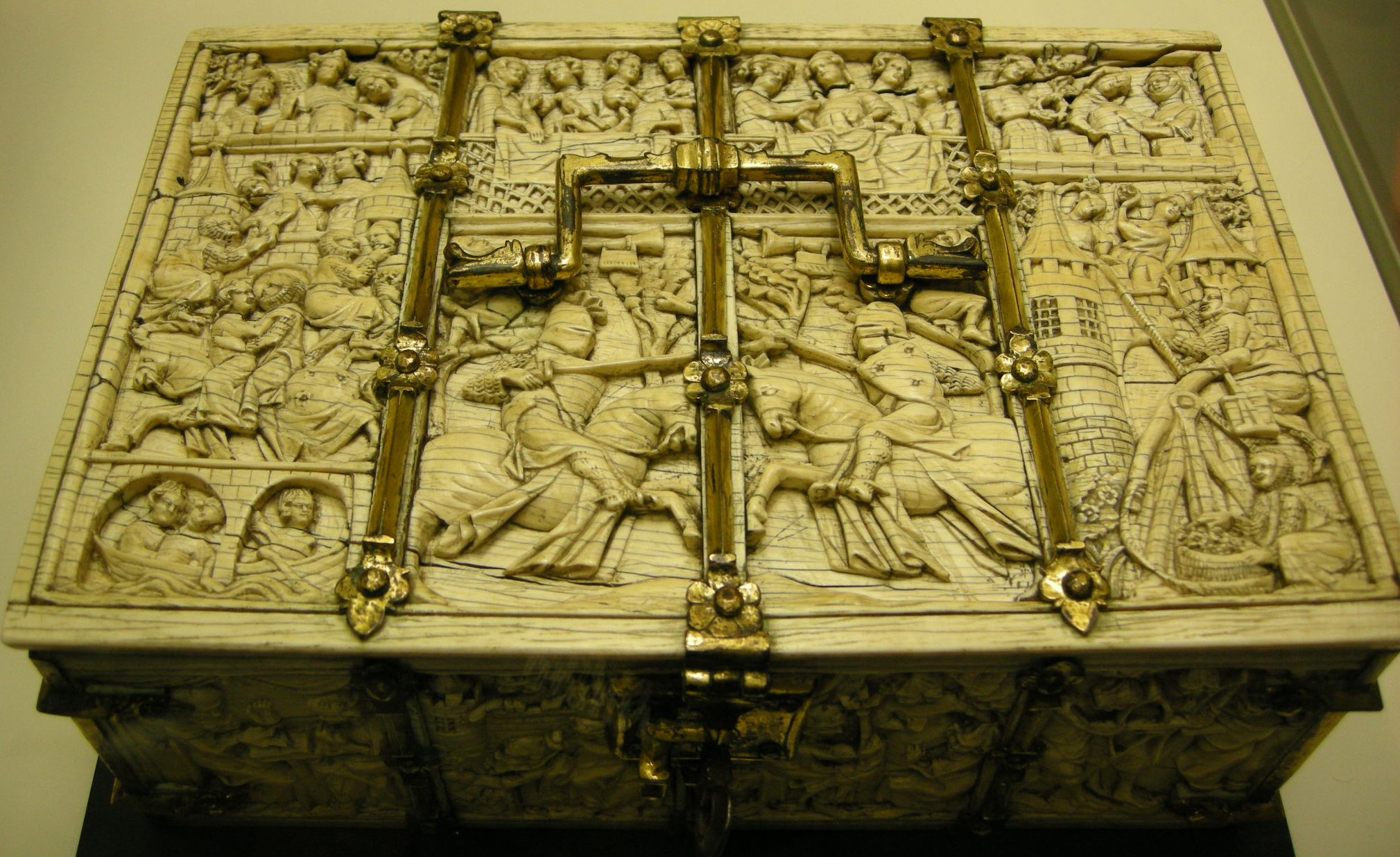
Lid of the Paris casket

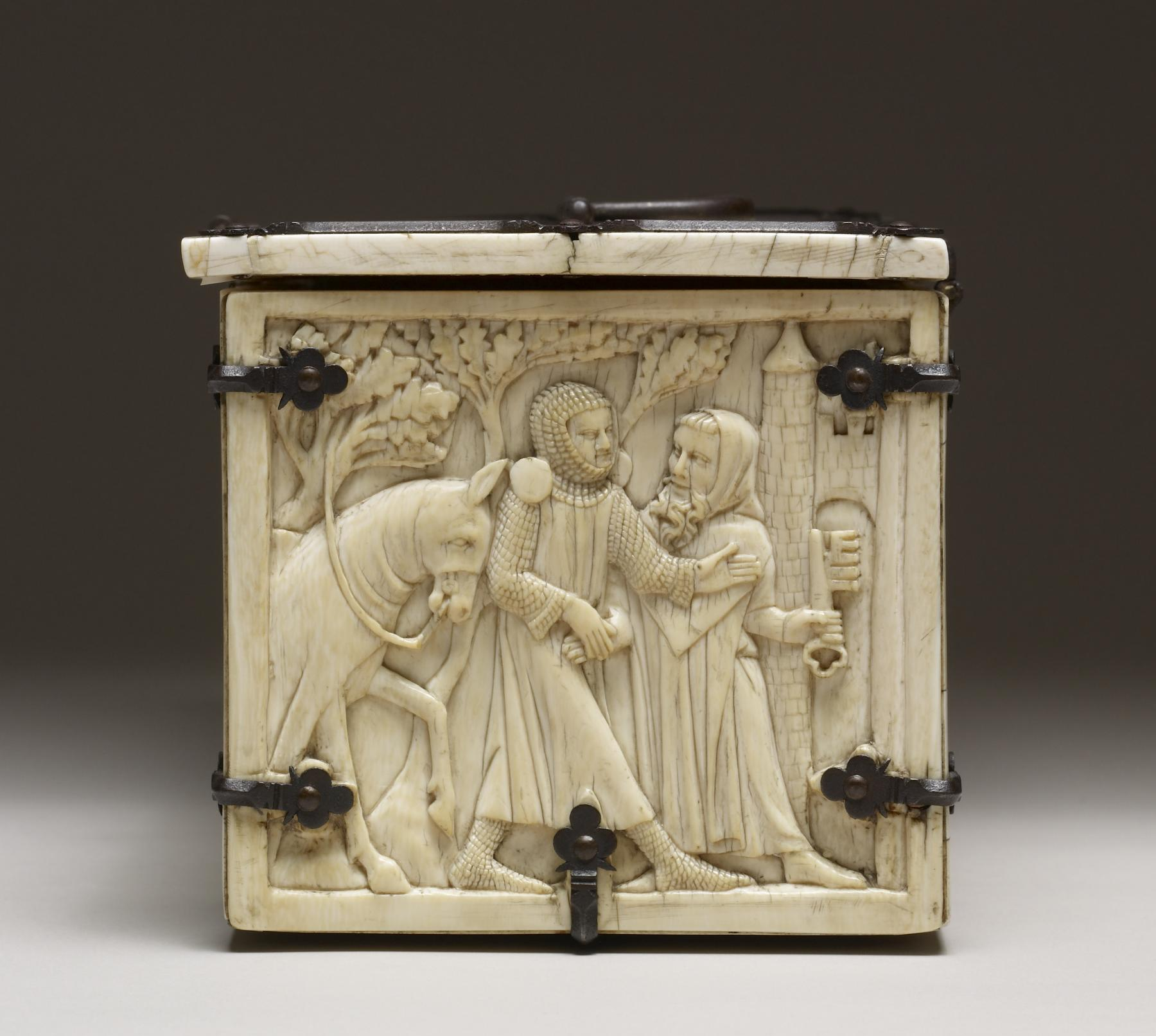
Walters, end, Galahad receiving the keys to the Castle of the Maidens

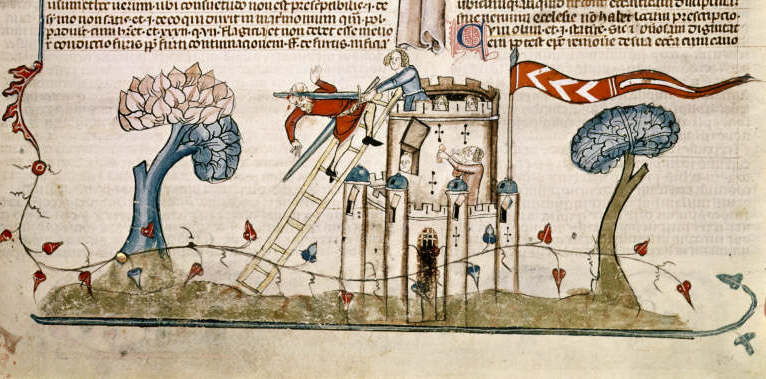
Not all images show women giving up their castle

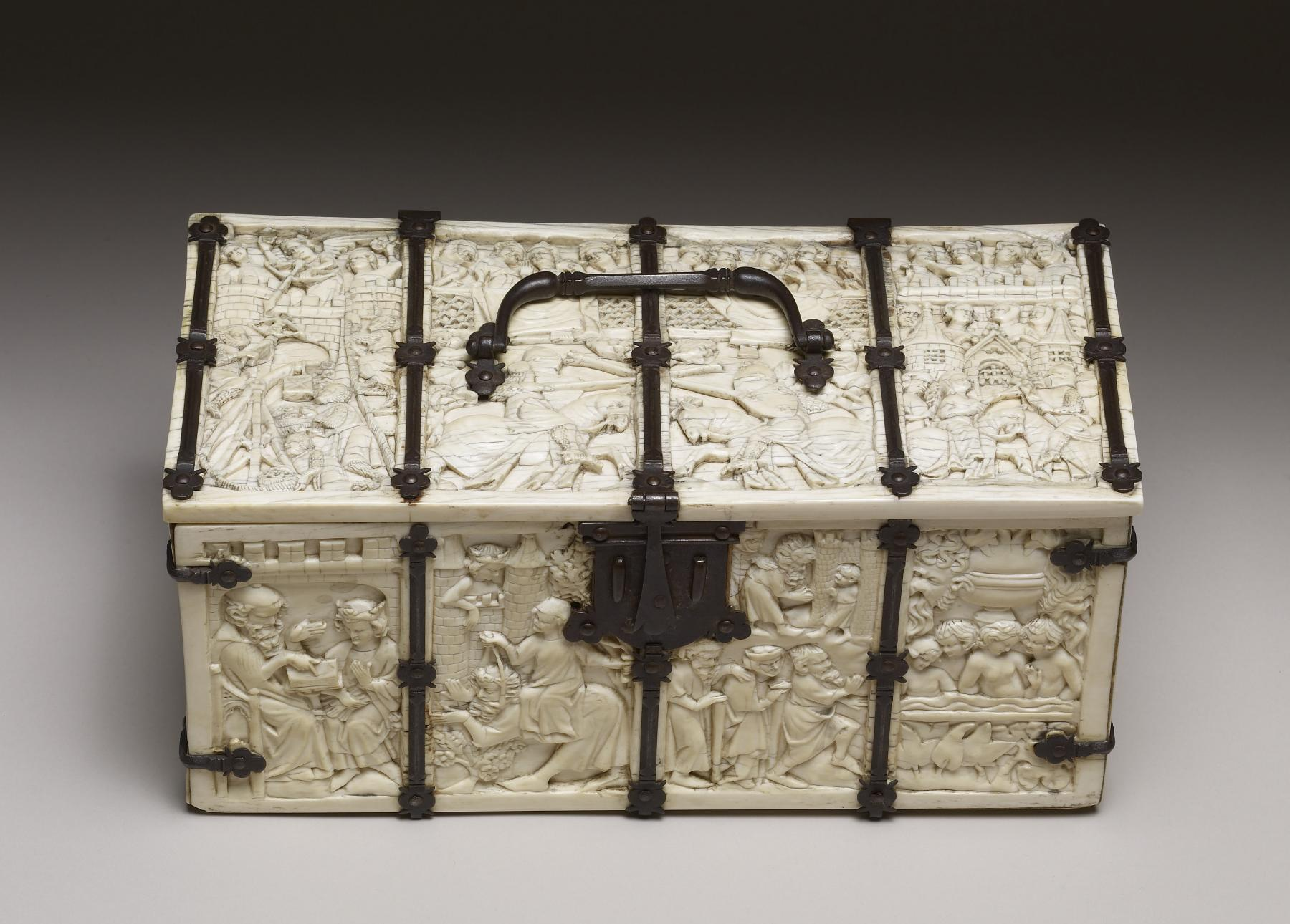
Walters, front view

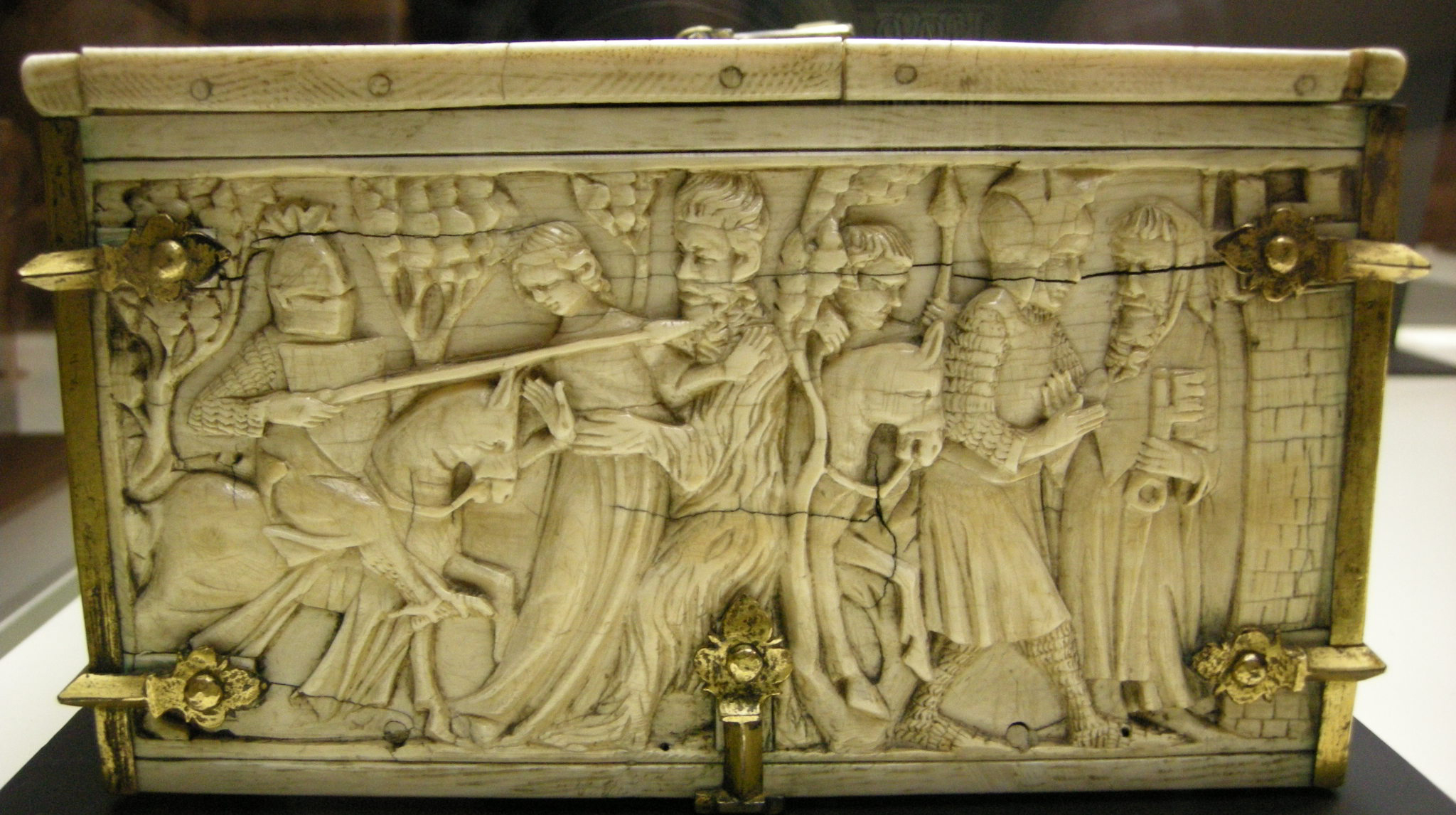
Paris: a different scene at left, as a knight rescues a lady from a woodwose, and the same Galahad scene at right

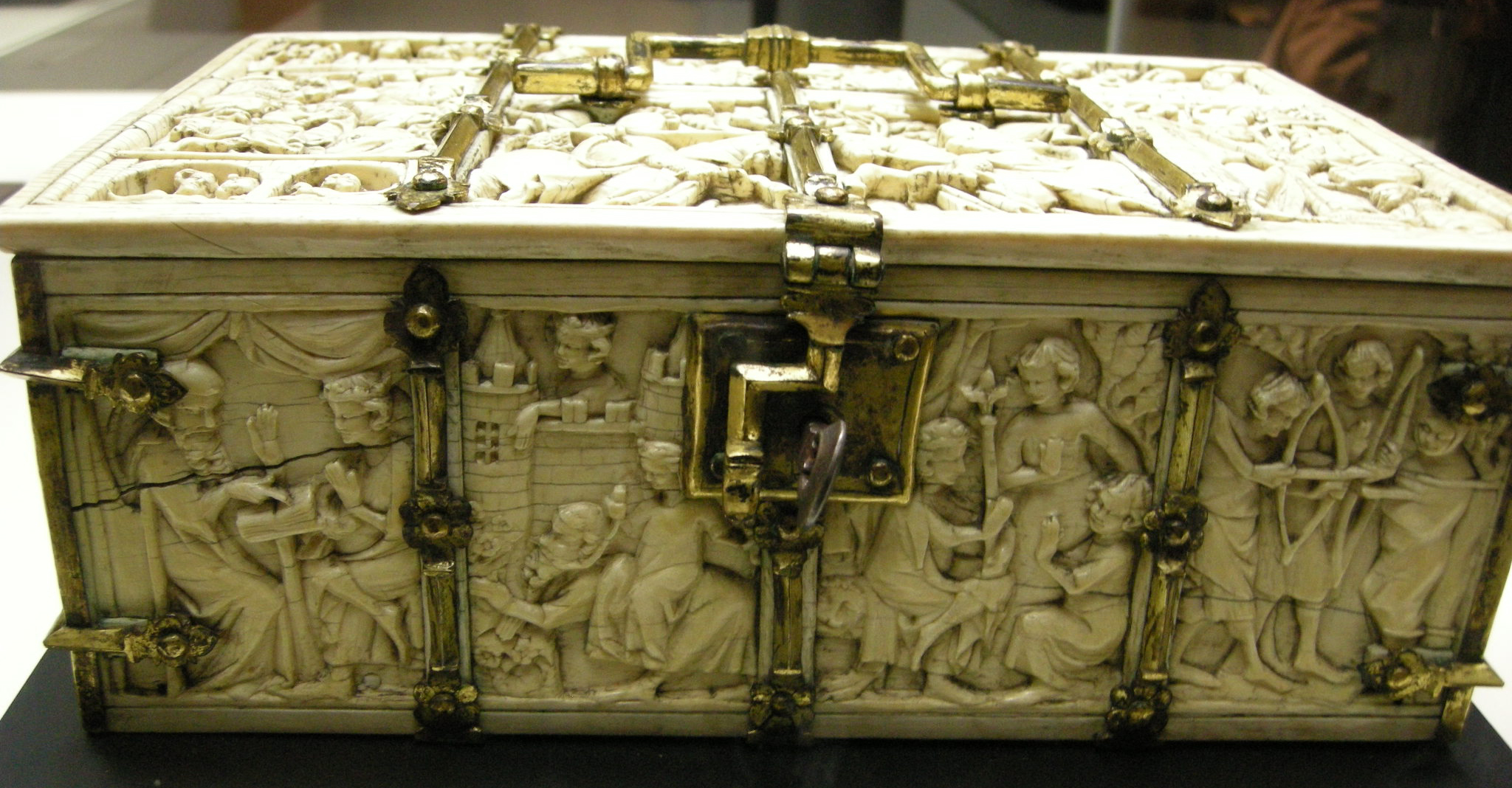
Paris: the same two Aristotle scenes (left), and two different ones to right.

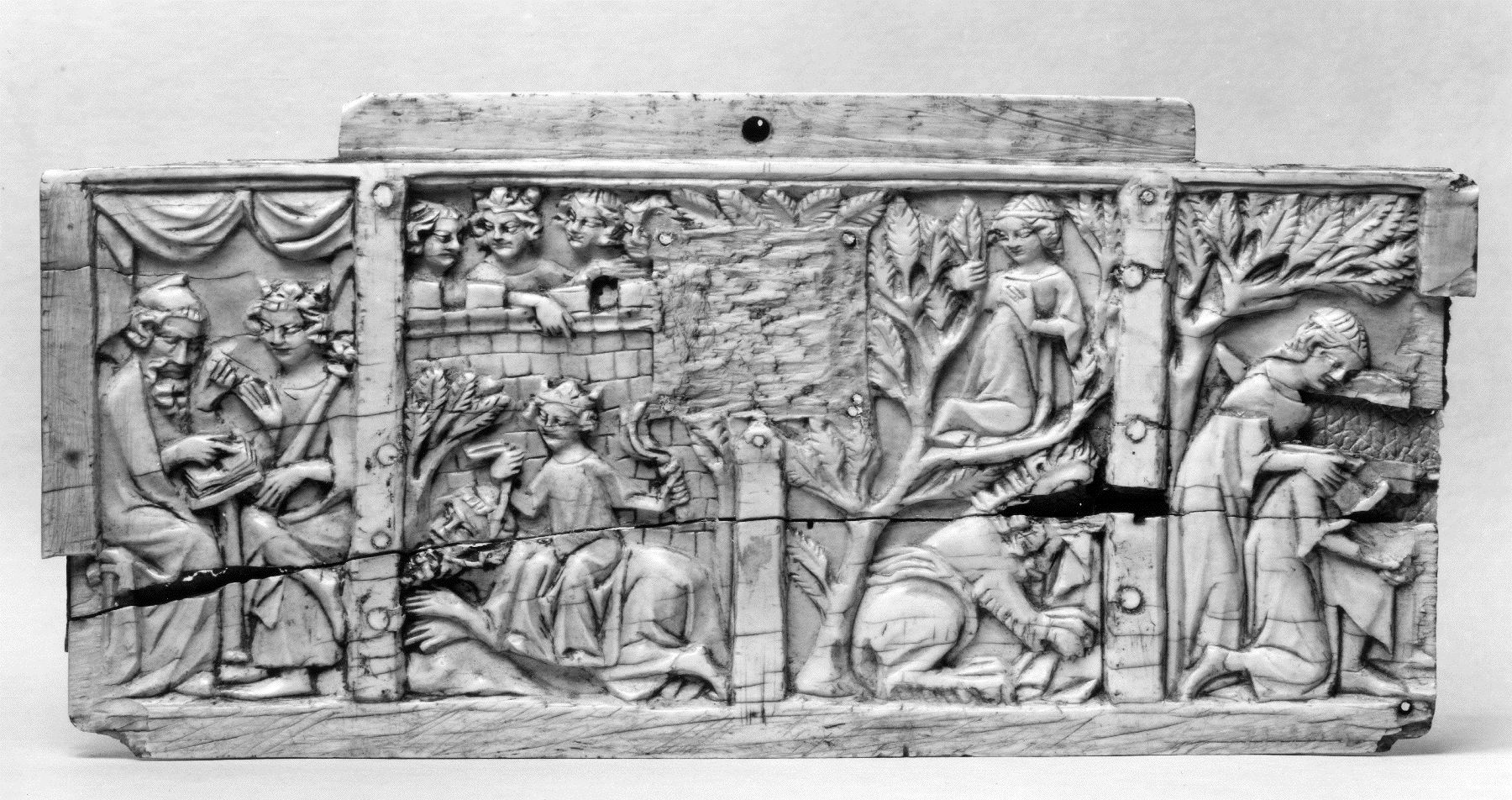
Walters 71196, a different French box panel with two of the same scenes

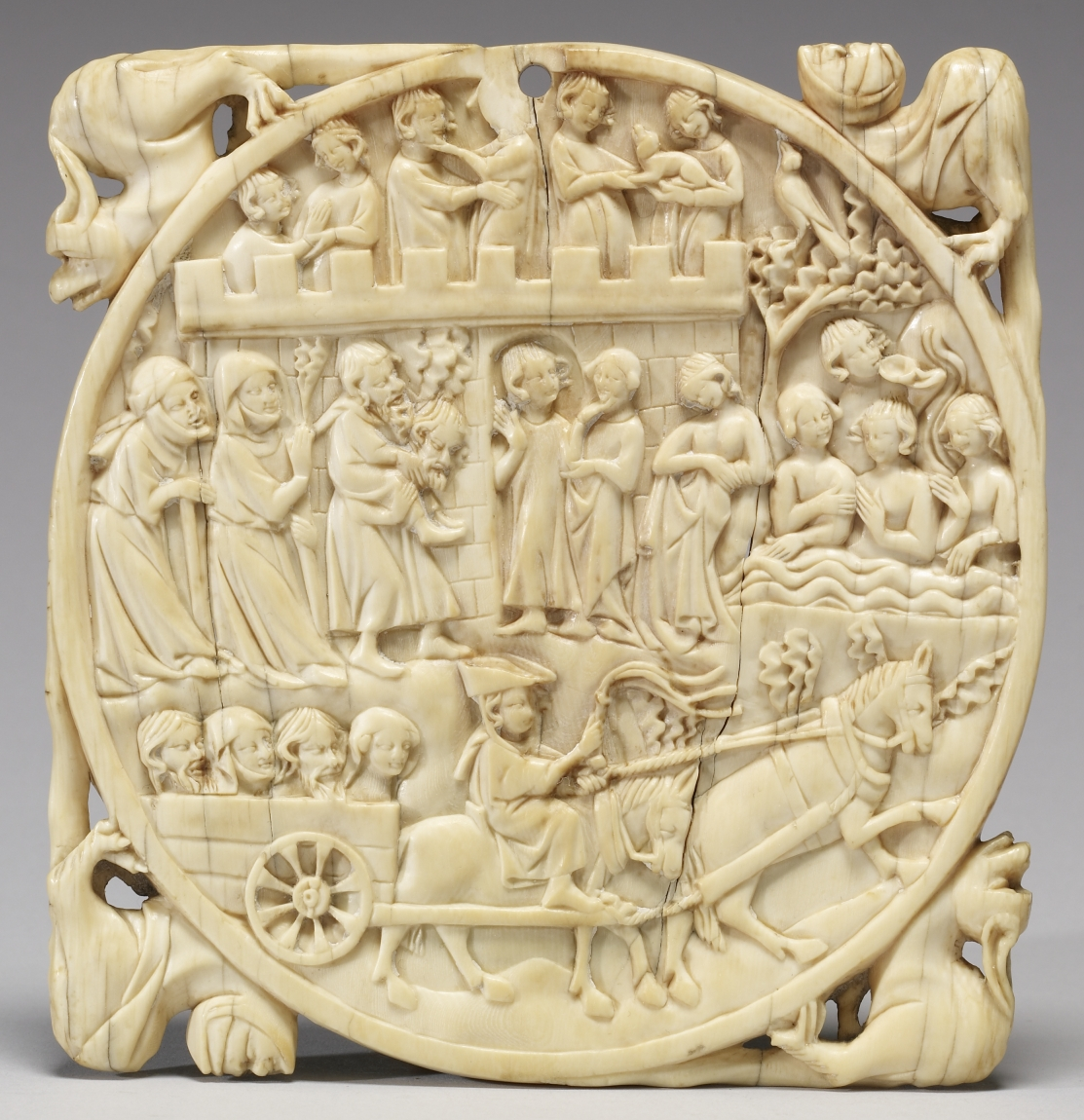
Walters 71170, a more common ivory mirror case with a Fountain of Youth

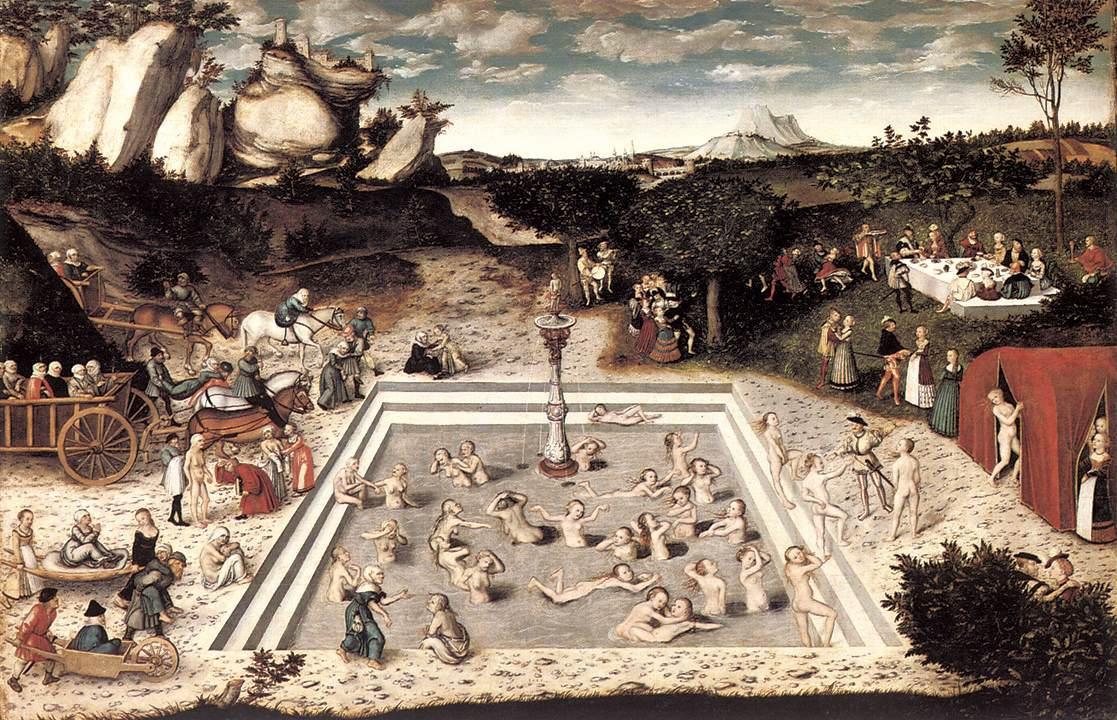
Fountain of Youth by Lucas Cranach the Elder, 1546

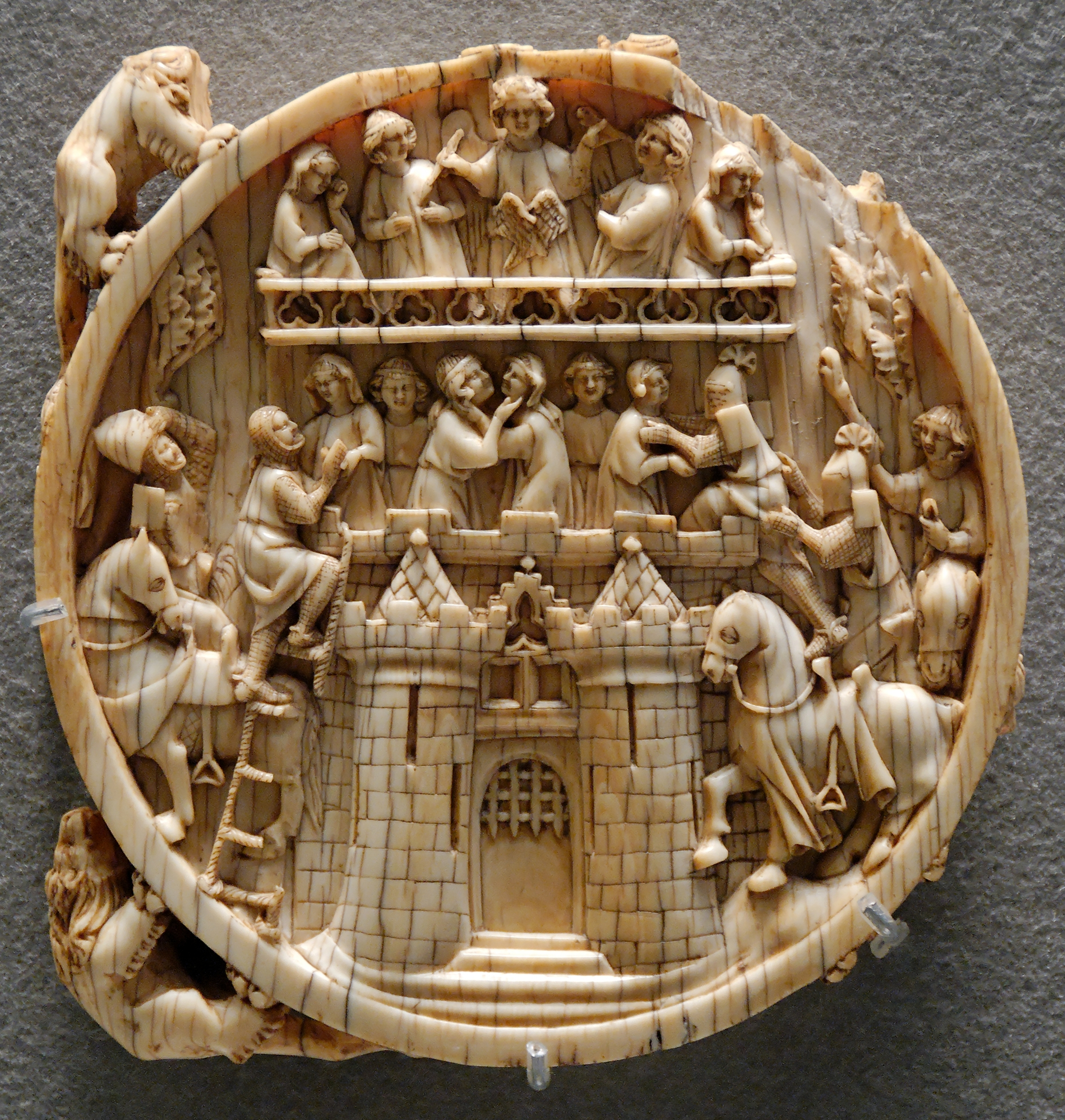
Siege of the Castle of Love on a mirror-case in the Louvre, 1350–1370; the ladies are losing.

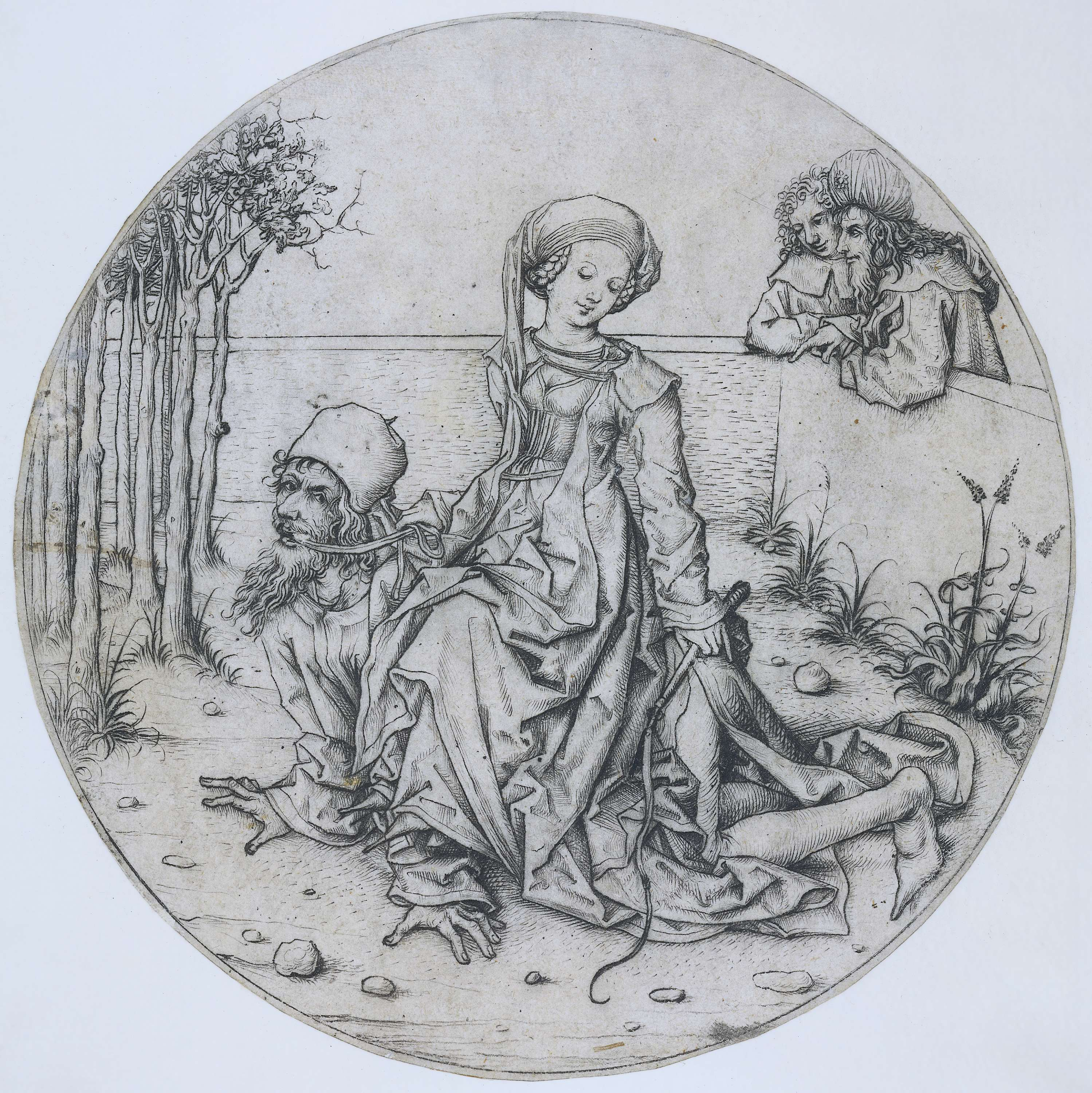
Master of the Housebook, Aristotle and Phyllis, 15th-century engraving

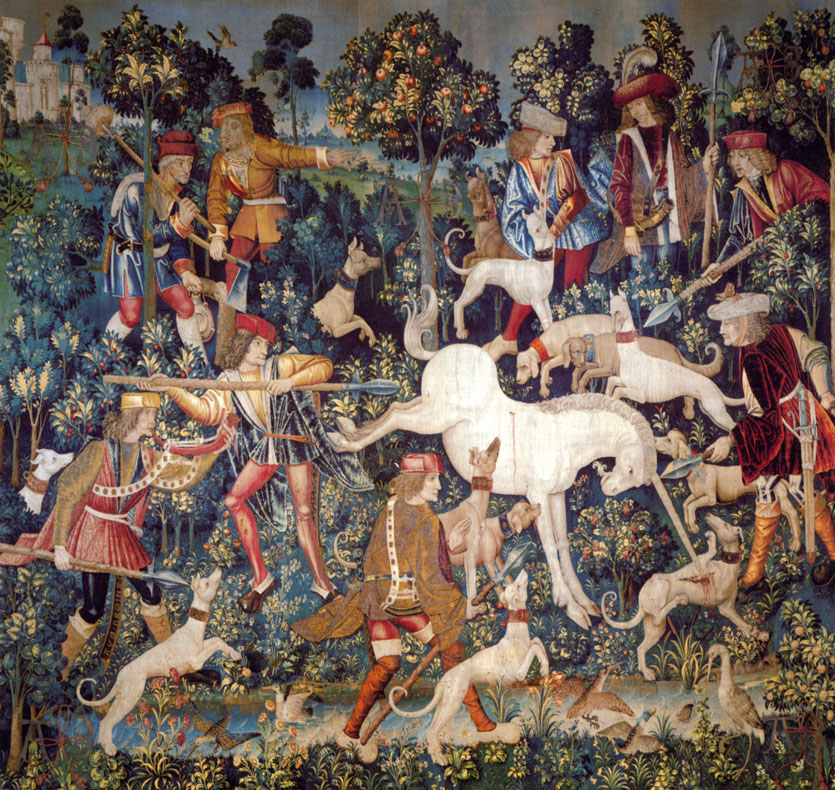
One of the tapestry series The Hunt of the Unicorn, 1495–1505, Flanders?

== Gothic ivories database ==
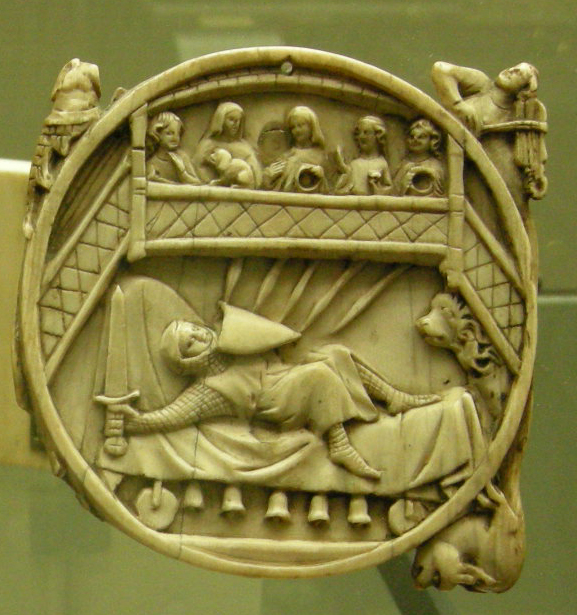
Another Gawain on the Perilous Bed

The Courtauld Institute maintains a database of over 5,000 Gothic ivories. The database catalogues the surviving composite caskets and the known fragments as follows:

- Barber Institute of Fine Arts, Inv. 39.26
- British Museum, 1856,0623.166 (Dalton 368)
- Château de Boulogne-sur-Mer, Inv. 408 (fragment)
- Cleveland Museum of Art, 1978.39a, 1978.39b, 1978.39c (three fragments)
- Cluny Museum, Cl. 23840
- Cracow Cathedral Treasury, S/n
- Detroit Institute of Arts, 1997.6 (fragment)
- Hermitage Museum, Inv. F 2912
- Louvre, MRR77
- Metropolitan Museum of Art, 17.190.173; 1988.16, 2003.131.2 (back panel of the dismantled casket referred below)
- Victoria and Albert Museum (one example), 146-1866, 264-1867 (no romance scenes)
- Walker Art Gallery, M 8052 (fragment)
- Walters Art Museum, 71.264
- Winnipeg Art Gallery, G-73-60 (the Gort casket, discovered in a Brighton (UK) junk shop in 1945)

In addition there are fragments from a dismantled casket, known from an 18th-century engraving, whose locations are unknown, save the back panel which is in the Metropolitan Museum of Art (2003.131.2):

- Unknown location, S/n
