= Master of the Weibermacht =

German engraver

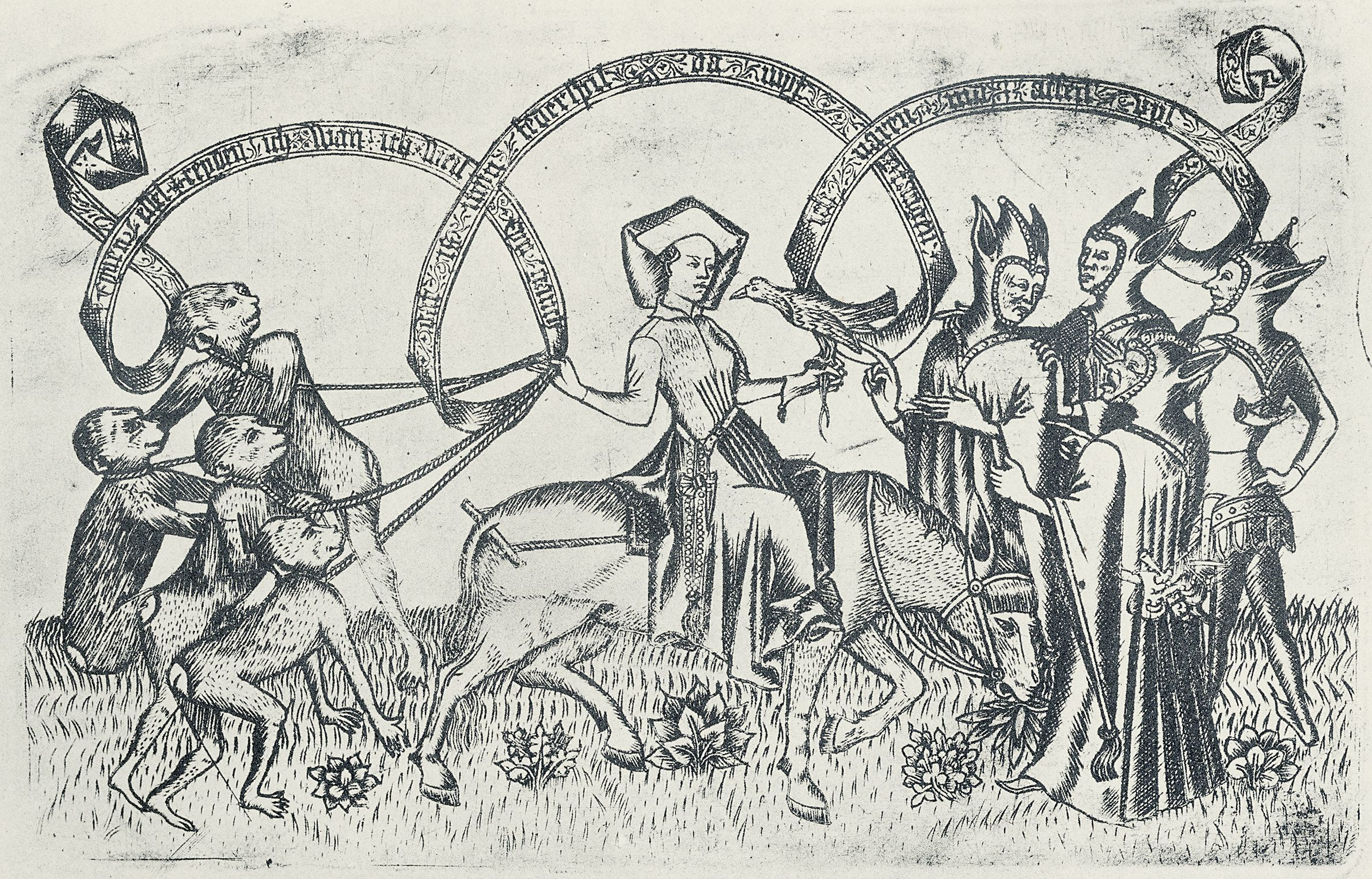
The Power of Women (German: Macht des Weibes) ca. 1451–75, copper engraving. In the collection of the Staatliche Graphische Sammlung, Munich

The Master of the Weibermacht (sometimes called the Master of 1462) was a German engraver active in the Lower Rhine area between about 1450 and 1460. His name comes from the work for which he is best known, a large-format engraving of an original interpretation of the common theme of Weibermacht, or the "Power of Women". A further group of engravings, depicting both religious and secular subjects, has also been attributed to him on the basis of style; the works in question show coarse draughtsmanship, and their engraving technique is similar. These works have nonetheless been ascribed to various artists at one time or another.
