= Susan L. Smith =

American art historian (1947–2021)

Susan Louise Smith (1947 – April 5, 2021) was an associate professor emeritus in the Department of Visual Arts at the University of California, San Diego (UCSD). She was noted for her 1995 book The Power of Women: A Topos in Medieval Art and Literature, an expansion of her 1978 doctoral dissertation on the Power of Women topos.

== Career ==
Smith received her BA from Swarthmore College, where she studied history and philosophy. She did graduate work in Medieval Studies at Yale University, and received her PhD in art history from the University of Pennsylvania in 1978. She subsequently taught at the University of California, San Diego (UCSD) as a visitor on several occasions, before joining the Department of Visual Arts at the university in 1987. She worked as a labor arbitrator and co-authored two books and an educational film on labor relations. She served as Provost of UCSD's John Muir College 2005–2012.

Smith's research interests include secular art of the Middle Ages and issues involving the cognitive function of vision in medieval theology and art theory. Her 1978 doctoral dissertation on the Power of Women topos was the first to explore this group of medieval themes focusing on the ways women employ their feminine wiles to triumph over men. She has been awarded numerous grants and awards, including a University of California Humanities Research Institute Fellowship for her participation in the collaborative research project "Theorizing Visual Culture: Discourse, Discipline, Pedagogy".

== Selected works ==
Books

- Smith, Susan Louise. The power of women: A topos in medieval art and literature. Univ of Pennsylvania Pr, 1995. ISBN 978-0-8122-3279-0

Scholarly articles

- Smith, Susan L. (1990). "The Power of Women Topos on a Fourteenth-Century Embroidery". Viator. 12: 203–234. doi:10.1484/J.VIATOR.2.301336.
- Smith, Susan L. (1994). "A Nude Judith from Padua and the Reception of Donatello's Bronze David". Comitatus: A Journal of Medieval and Renaissance Studies. 25 (1).
- Smith, Susan L. (1995). "The Bride Stripped Bare: A Rare Type of the Disrobing of Christ". Gesta. 34 (2): 126–146. doi:10.2307/767284. JSTOR 767284. S2CID 193471936.
- Smith, Susan L. (2003). "The Gothic Mirror and the Female Gaze". In Carroll, Jane L.; Stewart, Alison G. (eds.). Saints, Sinners, and Sisters: Gender and Northern Art in Medieval and Early Modern Europe. Ashgate. pp. 73–93. ISBN 978-0754605898.
- Smith, Susan L. (2006). "Women on Top". In Schaus, Margaret (ed.). Women and Gender in Medieval Europe: An Encyclopedia. Routledge. pp. 844–845. ISBN 978-0415969444.
