= Judith with the Head of Holofernes (Mantegna, Dublin) =

Painting by Andrea Mantegna

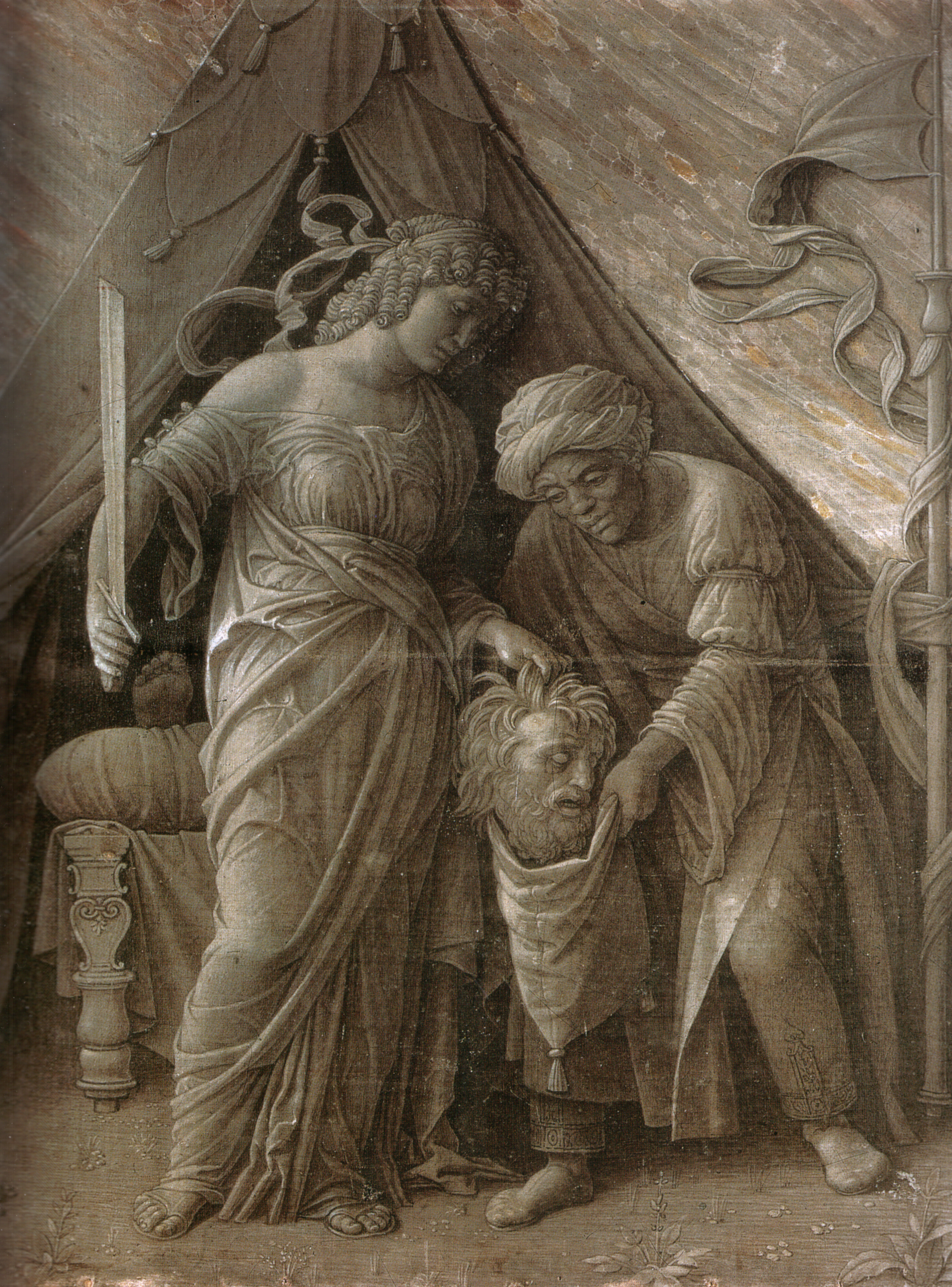
- Dimensions: 48.1 cm × 36.7 cm (18.9 in × 14.4 in)
- Location: National Gallery of Ireland, Dublin

Judith with the Head of Holofernes is a c. 1495 glue tempera on canvas painting by Andrea Mantegna, now in the National Gallery of Ireland in Dublin. It is in the grisaille style.

== History ==
This painting is part of the grisaille production that characterized many works of Mantegna in the later years of his career, from c. 1495 to the end of his life. These works were almost sculptural and were much appreciated in courts. At the time, near Mantua, there was a scarcity of active sculptors and it was difficult to procure marble, which had to be imported from nearby territories.

This artwork exhibits similar techniques, formal and thematic, with Mantegna's painting of Samson and Delilah. It has been hypothesized that they both could have hung together in one of the private rooms of Isabella d'Este in the Ducal Palace of Mantua.

Judith with the Head of Holofernes was acquired in Italy at an unknown time in the 20th century by Lewis Strange Wingfield. Afterwards, it passed into the collection of John Malcolm of Poltalloch in Scotland. It was then sold in 1896 to the director of the National Gallery of Ireland.

In the first years of its display to the public and to scholars, skepticism about the work circulated, despite the high opinions of Bernard Berenson and Paul Kristeller (both wrote about it in 1901). Now, the work is generally attributed to Mantegna, with some reservations from those who hold the work of students and assistants on the painting to have more or less importance.

== Description and style ==
Like Mantegna's other Judith and Holofernes and a c. 1491 drawing of the same subject in the Gabinetto dei disegni e delle stampe in Florence, Judith and her handmaid stand before the triangular tent of Holofernes. He was decapitated by Judith, who is holding in her hands a sword and placing his head in a sack held by her handmaid.

The painting uses tones of grey and white highlights, enriched in some places with brown brushstrokes, that accentuate the relief and the painting's illusionistic quality. The whole of the tent is left in shadow with some details emerging from the darkness, like the foot of Holofernes on the bed. The background is mottled like a fake marble. The passages of the drapery and the elegant play of lines in the flag at right, which twists with the wind around itself and the flagpole, are particularly skillful. The difficulty of painting on linen, almost without ground, does not permit corrections or pentimenti.
