= Tina Blondell =

American painter (b. 1953)

Tina Blondell (born 1953) is an Austrian/American painter. She was born in Salzburg, Austria, but spent the better part of her childhood in Italy where she was introduced to art. She moved to the United States, first to Washington, D.C. in 1971 and then to New Mexico in 1992. By the late 1990s, she had settled in Minneapolis, Minnesota. Her work has been exhibited nationally and internationally and her paintings are a part of many public collections, including in Minnesota at the Minneapolis Institute of Art and the Weisman Art Museum.

== Early life ==
Blondell was born in Salzburg, Austria, in 1953 to an American father and an Austrian mother. In 1957, she moved to Italy, where she lived until she was 18. In Italy, her father taught her how to draw, and she explored European art while traveling with her parents. Her interest and education in art was heavily influenced by seventeenth and nineteenth century artists such as Artemisia Gentileschi, Caravaggio, and Francisco Goya.

== Art ==
Blondell's works reflect a narrative style inspired by early art. Although her art is generally considered contemporary, she often quotes images from art history. She combines references to the past with a newer genre. Examples of her historical quoting include Urban American Gothic] (2008), which references Grant Wood's American Gothic from 1930. She also references historical and biblical stories such as Judith beheading Holofernes in her 1999 watercolor painting I'll Make You Shorter By a Head.

Many of the subjects in Blondell's paintings are inspired by her friends and acquaintances. Blondell's contemporary paintings often contain themes related to feminism and activism. In her painting Urban American Gothic (2008), she hints at the same-sex couple in the painting with a human rights logo on the cap. She represents women's empowerment through paintings like These Boots Are Made For Walking (2007). Many of these paintings celebrate women and womanhood.

== Collections and exhibitions ==
Aside from private collections, Blondell's work can be found in the permanent collections at the Minneapolis Institute of Art and the Weisman Art Museum. She also has public paintings in Hennepin County. These include Helping Hands at the Hennepin County Commissioners Office (2000) and the Hennepin County History Mural at the Hennepin County Government Center (2000).
