= Samson and Delilah (Mantegna) =

Painting by Andrea Mantegna

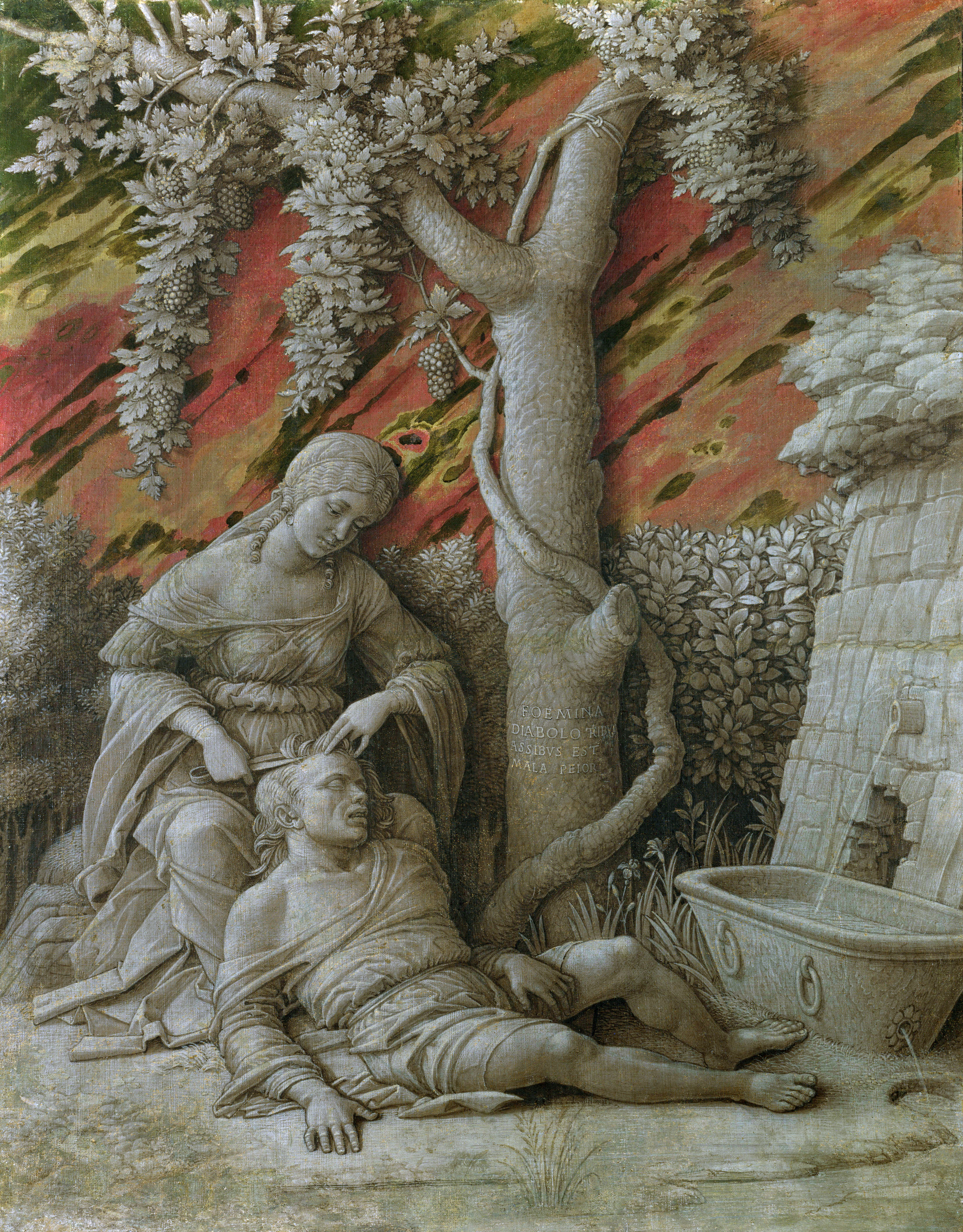
- Artist: Andrea Mantegna
- Year: 1495–1500
- Medium: glue tempera on linen canvas
- Dimensions: 47 cm × 37 cm (19 in × 15 in)
- Location: National Gallery, London

Samson and Delilah is a painting of circa 1495–1500 in glue tempera on linen canvas by Andrea Mantegna, now in the National Gallery, London.

It is one of Mantegna's works in the grisaille style between 1495 and his death. Its format and technique are similar to Judith with the Head of Holofernes (National Gallery of Ireland). It is a depiction of the biblical episode of Samson and Delilah.

== Bibliography ==
- (in Italian) Mauro Lucco (ed), Mantegna a Mantova 1460–1506, exhibition catalogue, Skira Milano, 2006
- (in Italian) Stefano Zuffi, Il Quattrocento, Electa, Milano 2004. ISBN 8837023154
