= Judith with the Head of Holofernes (Mantegna, Washington) =

Painting by Andrea Mantegna or a follower

Judith and Holofernes
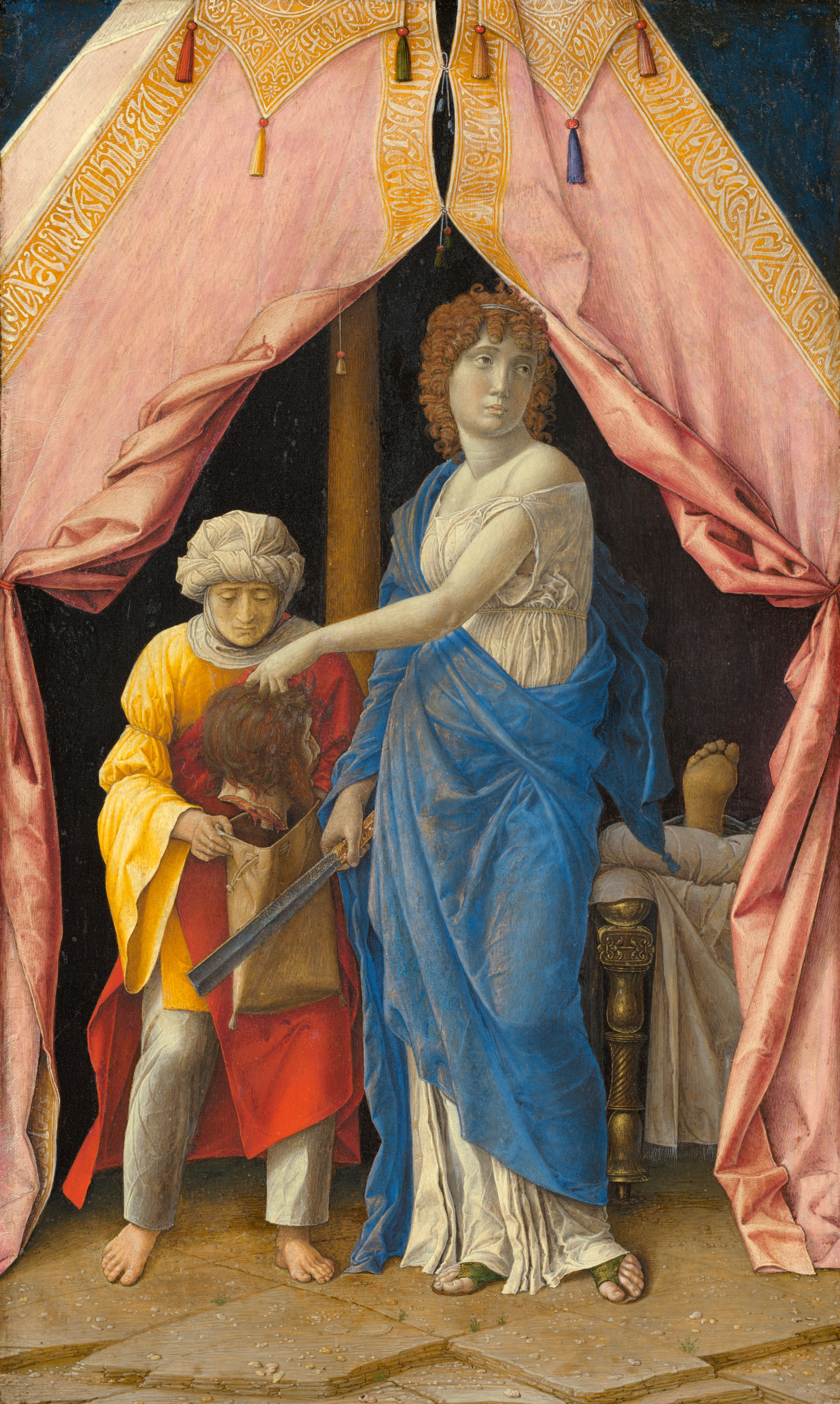
- Artist: Andrea Mantegna or a follower (possibly Giulio Campagnola)
- Year: c. 1495/1500
- Type: Tempera with gold and silver on panel
- Dimensions: 30.6 cm × 19.7 cm (12.0 in × 7.8 in)
- Location: National Gallery of Art, Washington, D.C.

Judith with the Head of Holofernes is an Italian Renaissance painting attributed to Andrea Mantegna or to a follower of his, possibly Giulio Campagnola. Painted in tempera in around 1495 or 1500, it depicts the common artistic subject of Judith beheading Holofernes.

== History ==
The painting has been dated through comparison with similar grisaille panels with Old Testament subjects which Mantegna produced around 1495 and 1500.

The work was perhaps included in the Gonzaga collection acquired by Charles I of England in 1628. Given to William Herbert, 6th Earl of Pembroke, it was inherited by his heirs until it was sold in London in 1917. After a series of different owners, it was acquired in New York City by Joseph E. Widener in 1923. In 1942, it was donated to the National Gallery of Art in Washington, D.C.

== Description ==
In a relatively serene interpretation of the theme, Judith is portrayed standing under the pink tent of Holofernes (whose foot can be seen on the right) immediately after beheading him, still holding the blade. She is dropping the head into a sack held by a maid. The composition also appears in Mantegna's grisaille paintings of this subject in Dublin and in Montreal, and a drawing in the Gabinetto dei disegni e delle stampe of the Uffizi.

The panel has brilliant and variegated colors, resembling a miniature. The ground, painted in diagonal perspective, is composed of stone and earth slabs, some of which are out of position. It is painted with tempera with gold and silver.

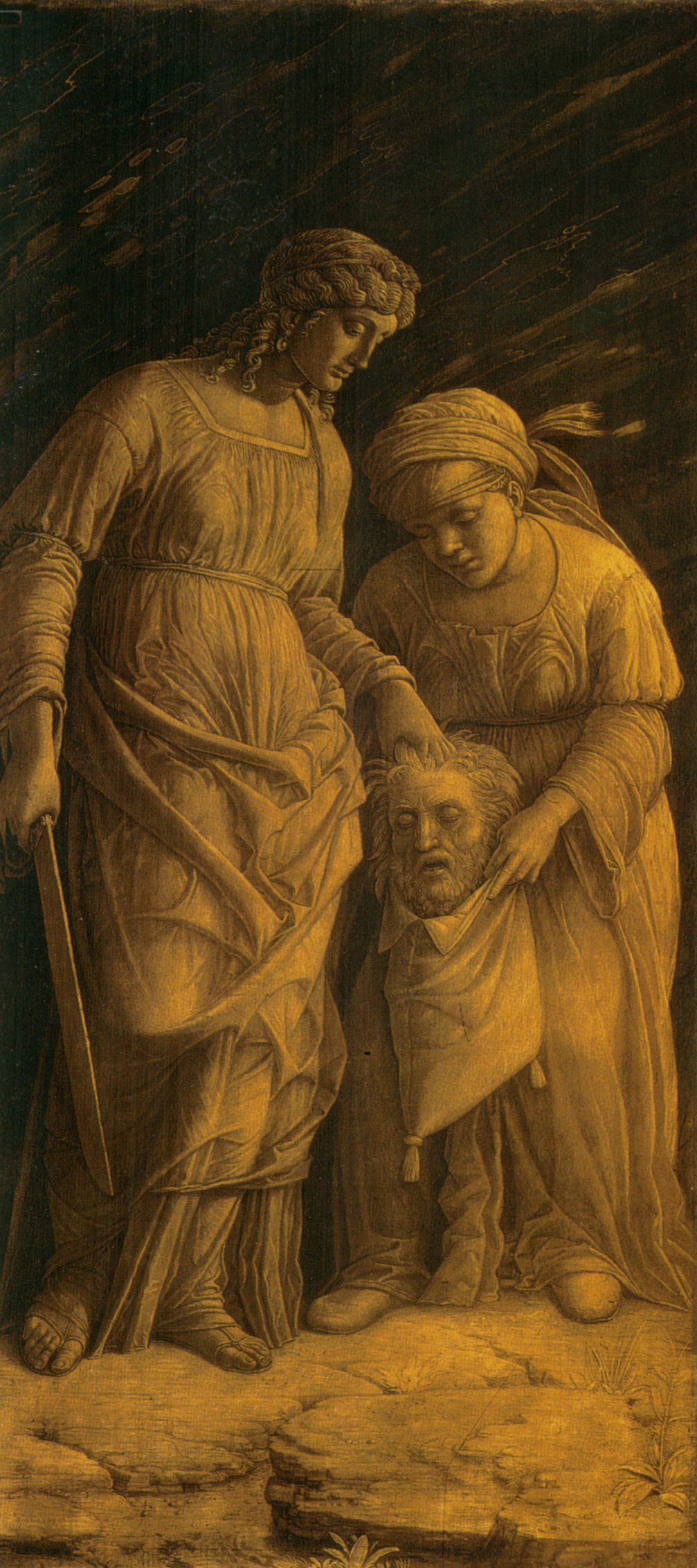
Andrea Mantegna, Judith with the Head of Holofernes (1490s), Montreal Museum of Fine Arts

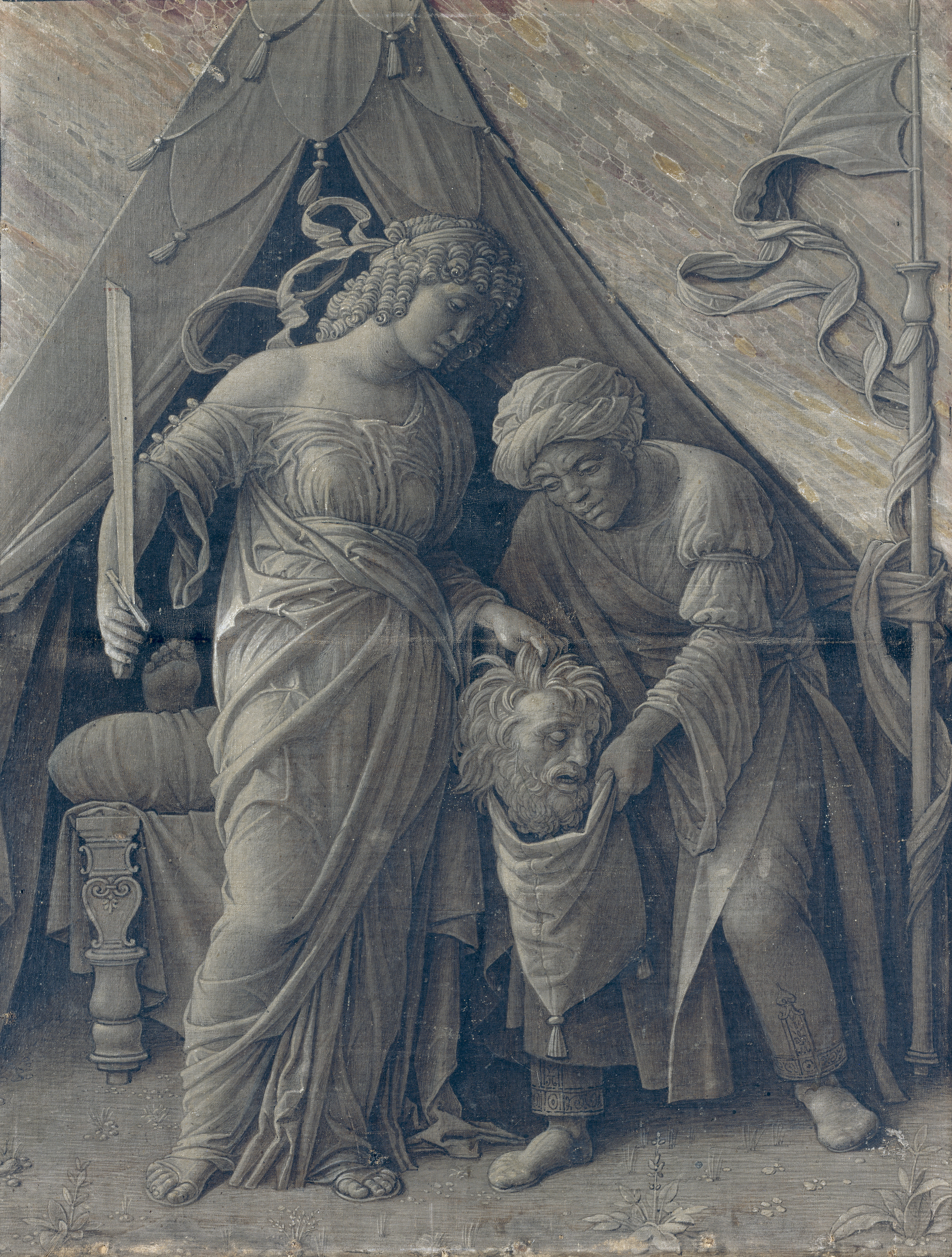
Andrea Mantegna, Judith with the Head of Holofernes, National Gallery of Ireland

== Bibliography ==
- La Grande Storia dell'Arte – Il Quattrocento, Il Sole 24 Ore, 2005
- Kleiner, Frank S. Gardner's Art Through the Ages, 13th edition, 2008
- Manca, Joseph. Andrea Mantegna and the Italian Renaissance, 2006
