= Lot and his Daughters =

Lot and his Daughters, or Lot and his Daughters, with Sodom and Gomorrah Burning is a subject in art showing Lot from the Hebrew Bible and his two daughters.

Examples of such works include:

- Lot and His Daughters (anonymous), c. 1520
- Lot and His Daughters (Orazio Gentileschi, Los Angeles)
- Lot and His Daughters (Orazio Gentileschi, Bilbao)
- Lot and His Daughters (Vouet), Simon Vouet, 1633
- Lot and His Daughters (Artemisia Gentileschi), 1635–1638
- Lot and His Daughters (Hayez), (Francesco Hayez), 1833
- Lot and his Daughters, with Sodom and Gomorrah Burning (miniature from Transylvania), 1842
