= Lot and His Daughters (Hayez) =

Painting by Francesco Hayez

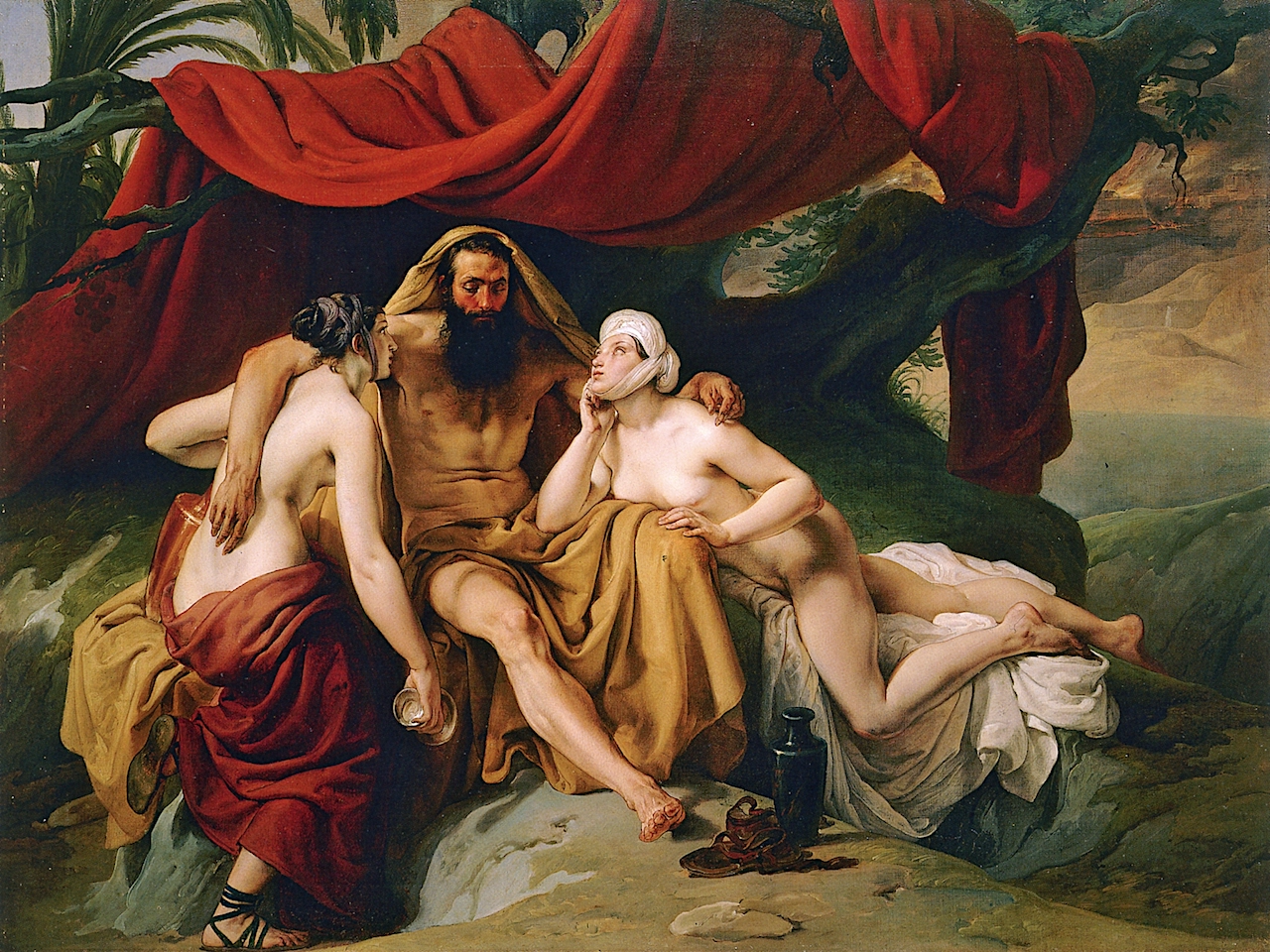
- Artist: Francesco Hayez
- Year: 1833
- Type: Oil on canvas, history painting
- Location: Private collection

Lot and His Daughters (Italian: Loth con le figlie) is an 1833 history painting by the Italian artist Francesco Hayez. It portrays the Old Testament biblical scene of Lot's daughters's attempting to seduce their father Lot, having intoxicated him with wine. In the distance can be seen the burning city's of Sodom and Gomorrah. The story has been a popular subject for artists for several centuries. Hayez, a leading painter of the romantic movement, often combined religious themes with nude art.

== Bibliography ==
- De Capoa, Chiara. Old Testament Figures in Art. Getty Publications, 2003.
- Mazzocca, Fernando . Hayez privato: arte e passioni nella Milano romantica. U. Allemandi, 1997.
- Vasta, Daniela. La pittura sacra in Italia nell’Ottocento: Dal Neoclassicismo al Simbolismo. Gangemi Editore, 2012.
