= Danaë (Orazio Gentileschi) =

Painting by Orazio Gentileschi

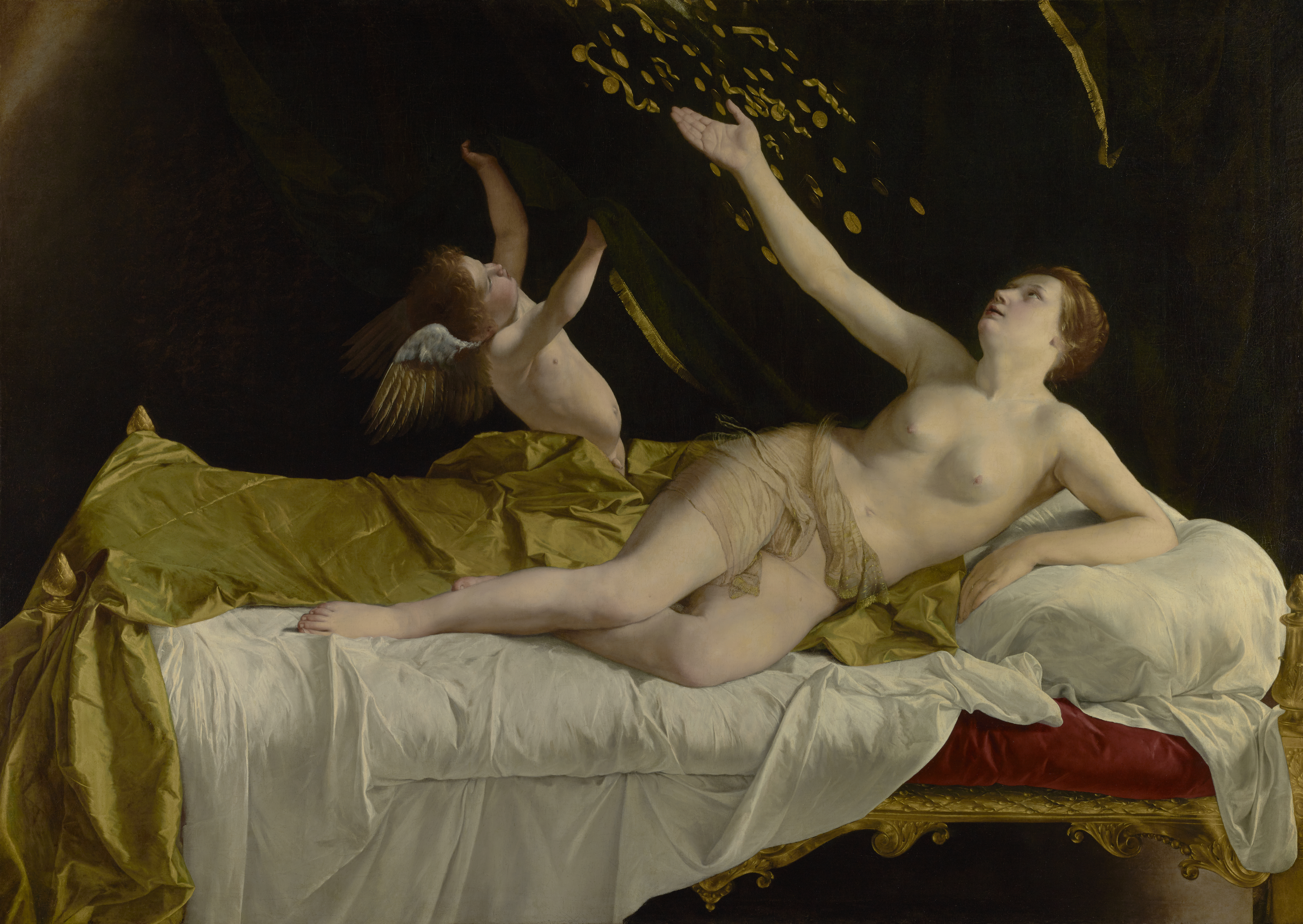
Orazio Gentileschi, c. 1623, oil on canvas, 63 ½ by 89 ¼ in (161.3 by 226.7 cm.)

Danaë is a circa 1623 oil on canvas painting by the Italian artist Orazio Gentileschi. It is an example of an Italian Baroque painting and is now in the collection of the J. Paul Getty Museum, in Los Angeles.

== History and description ==
The painting was commissioned in 1621 by Giovanni Antonio Sauli who had invited Gentileschi to Genoa. Gentileschi painted a number of works for Sauli besides the Danäe, including a Penitent Magdalen and a Lot and his Daughters. The painting draws together the Caravaggesque naturalism that influenced Gentileschi's earlier work with the Tuscan lyricism he later developed.

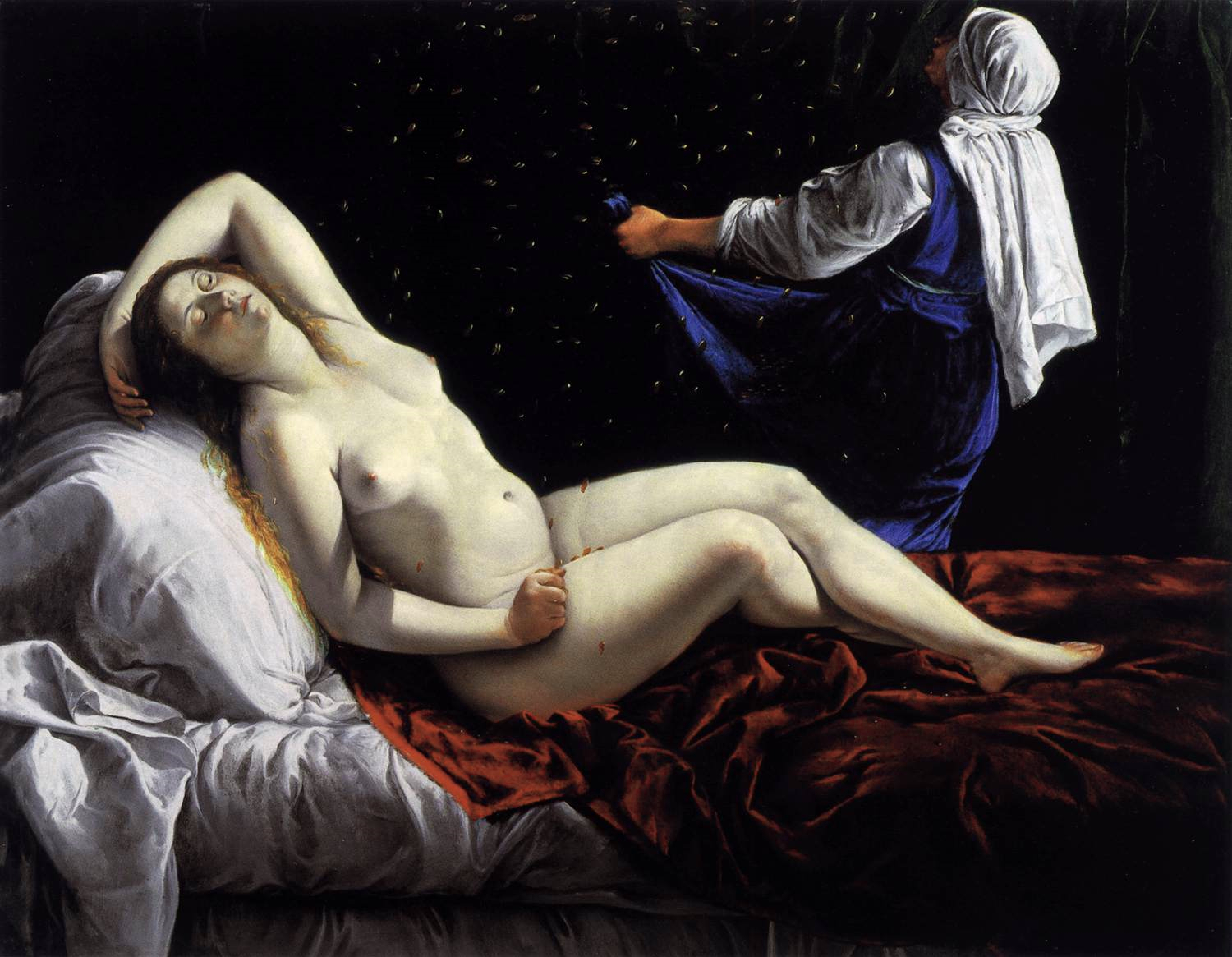
Artemisia Gentileschi - Danaë

The subject of the painting is the ancient Greek myth of Danaë, which tells of how Zeus, king of the gods, visited Danaë in a shower of gold, from which union Perseus was born. The myth is regarded as a forerunner of the Christian belief in the Annunciation, the divine conception of Christ.

Orazio's daughter Artemisia Gentileschi had portrayed Danaë earlier.

The painting was auctioned at Sotheby's New York on 28 January 2016. It was the most important Baroque painting to be offered for sale in decades, and purchased for US$30,500,000 by the Getty. It is to be hung alongside Gentileschi's Lot and his Daughters.

The arrival of Zeus is foretold by Eros, who pulls aside a dark green curtain to let the golden rain fall. Gentileschi manages to blend the movement and dynamism of gold coins and falling ribbons with the serenity of Danae's sculptural physicality and classic charm. Danae is lying on her bed waiting for her, on a white mattress over which lies a golden blanket. Although the figure is quite sensual (the woman is covered only by a transparent veil in the pubic area), Orazio Gentileschi painted her with such grace and moderation as not to make the scene descend into the vulgar: Danae remains a chaste figure who accepts her ineluctable fate. It is a completely different Danae from the consenting one painted by Titian, today in the Capodimonte museum in Naples, which Orazio may have seen in Rome, when it was exhibited in Palazzo Farnese. The painting knows how to combine the Caravaggesque naturalism that influenced Gentileschi's previous works with the Tuscan lyricism that he later developed.

== Provenance ==
- Commissioned in 1621 by Giovanni Antonio Sauli, Genoa;
- By descent and inheritance in the family;
- Thomas P. Grange, London, by 1975;
- By whom sold in 1977 to Richard L. Feigen;
- By whom sold on 2 October 1998 to a family trust, the present consignor.

== See also ==
- List of works by Orazio Gentileschi
