= Lot and his Daughters, with Sodom and Gomorrah Burning (miniature from Transylvania) =

Illustration by Picu Pătruț

Sodom and Gomorrah Burning
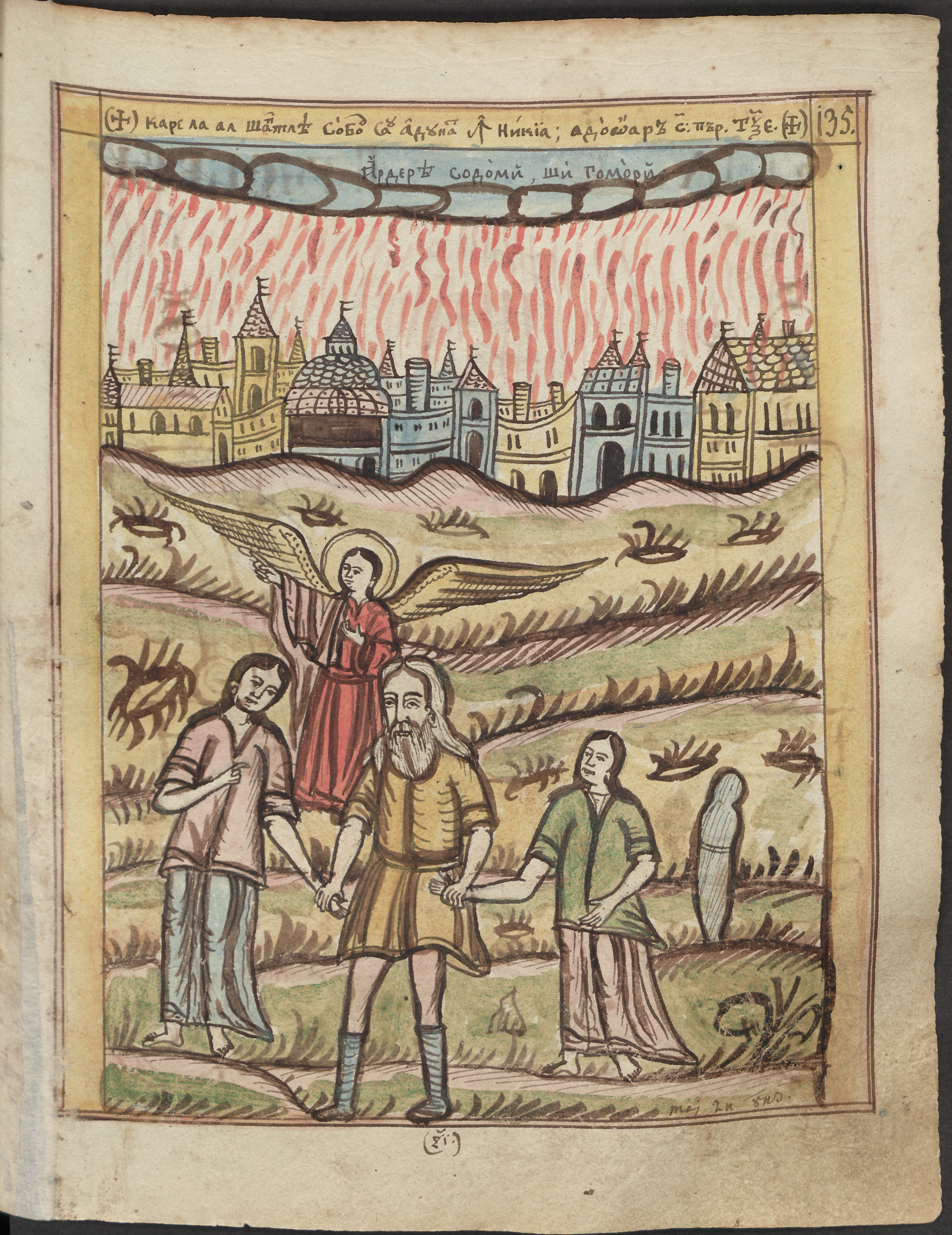
- Author: Pătruţ (PICU)
- Publication date: 1842
- Publication place: Romania
- Media type: laid paper
- Museum of the Romanian Peasant

Lot and his Daughters, with Sodom and Gomorrah Burning is a miniature in pen and watercolour from a very late illuminated manuscript bible. The illustration by Picu Pătruț (1818–1872) of Transylvania, begun on May 24, 1842, is one of the 139 miniatures made from 1842 to 1851 for the "Bible of St. Petersburg" from 1819.

The page size is 19 x 15 centimeters. It is in the collection of the Museum of the Romanian Peasant.

The scene uses the traditional iconography for the biblical scene of Lot and his daughters, leaving the Cities of the Plain, led by an angel. On the right behind them is Lot's wife, who was turned into a pillar of salt for looking back to the city.

== See also ==
- Sodom and Gomorrah
