= Lot and His Daughters (Orazio Gentileschi, Los Angeles) =

Painting by Orazio Gentileschi

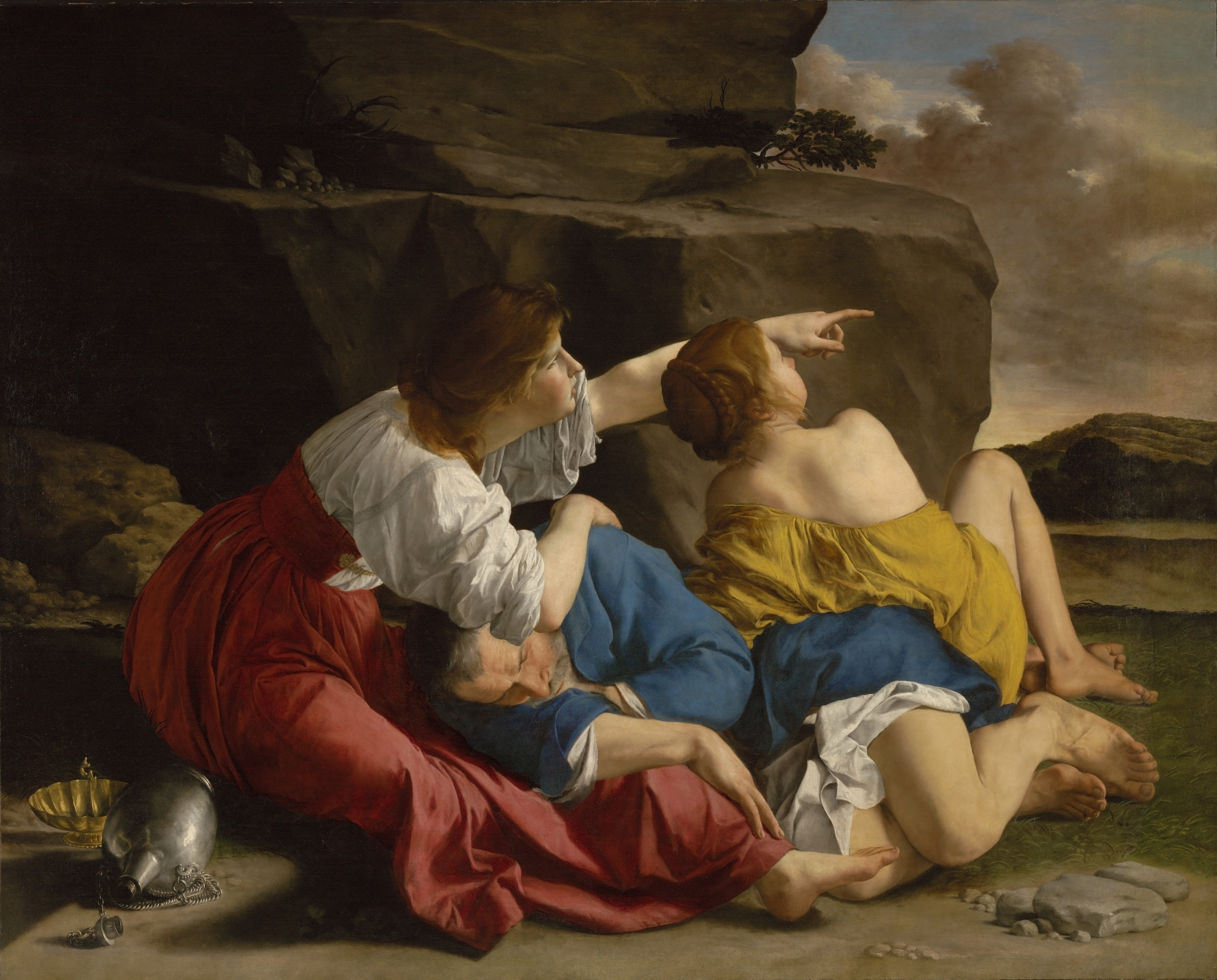
Lot and His Daughters (1622), J. Paul Getty Museum, Los Angeles.

Lot and His Daughters is a 1622 painting by Orazio Gentileschi. Executed in oil on canvas, the large painting depicts the Biblical tale of Lot and his two daughters after the destruction of Sodom.

The painting comes from the home of Giovanni Antonio Sauli who commissioned the work along with Danaë and Penitent Magdalen. It has been owned by the Getty Museum in Los Angeles since 1998.

== History ==
Orazio Gentileschi originally was a Mannerist painter, however after the turn of the 17th century, Gentileschi was deeply influenced by Caravaggio. As with Caravaggio, Gentileschi employed deep use of tenebrism, painted from models and did studies from real life, but according to the authors, Gentileschi was more faithful to the representation of the model. While Caravaggio's art allowed interpretation from the viewer, Gentileschi heightened the "transformation of the everyday into the extraordinary and dramatic." In 1621, Gentileschi moved to Genoa as per the invitation of Giovanni Antonio Sauli who knew Gentileschi as he had paintings done by Gentileschi's brother. After the promise of employment, Gentileschi made the move from Rome to Genoa, and it was during this time that Sauli commissioned Gentileschi to paint not only Lot and His Daughters, but two other works Penitent Magdalene and Danäe and the Shower of Gold, to create a series of three. All three paintings coexisted in the same room in the palace of Domenico Sauli according to a statement by Carlo Giuseppe Ratti, and have a poetic sensual nature about them.

Gentileschi followed the trend of painters of the time and created multiple versions of each painting. Traced back to a Genoese collection and with the aid of X rays, the painting of Lot and His Daughters acquired by the Getty Museum has been established as the prime version of Gentilschi's composition.

There is a theme that ties the triad of works Danaë, Penitent Magdalen, and Lot and His Daughters, The combination is odd as each painting deals with different cycles of history and individual themes. These themes are from the Old Testament, the New Testament, and one is of classical Pagan mythology. The authors also give the argument that each of the works could be erotic (Danaë), moral (Lot and His Daughters), and distinctly devotional (Danaë) . While all three have to do with themes that involve women, two of the paintings incorporate the reclining long figure – Penitent Magdalene and Danaë. In contrast, Lot and His Daughters occupy a multi figure narrative. The two reclining figures contrast each other quite dramatically while Lot seems to be a middle ground between the two extremes. This could be an attempt to attest to the extensive range of work that Gentileschi was capable of, and most certainly helped his popularity after the completion of the three works. Unfortunately, only two of the three works – Danaë and the Shower of Gold and Lot and His Daughters – remain together. The Penitent Magdalene was sold to a private collection. Both Danaë and Lot are next to each other in the Getty.

== Description ==
Lot and His Daughters is an oil on canvas landscape painting that measures 59.75 x 74.5 inches. The painting contains three figures, Lot and his daughters, centrally placed and surrounded by a landscape setting. All three are clothed in contemporary garb that would have been worn in 17th century daily life, certainly not garb seen in the Bronze Age in the city of Sodom pre-1200 BCE. Lot is in the center and his two daughters flank each side of him. He is seen in a hunching position resting his head in the lap of his daughter to the left, while the daughter to the right leans back on him for support. As he is laying down it is uncertain whether Lot is sleeping, frightened by the terror going on in Sodom, or simply drunk. His facial expression is not completely visible to the viewer, however, his eyes are closed and his brows are furrowed citing some form of discomfort that he is having, whether it is a result of his intoxication or his reaction to the sounds of Sodom. His right arm languidly falls over the leg of his daughter that he is laying on and is devoid of tension. He is also in a half fetal position and his body seems relaxed in comparison to the tense nature of his two daughters. There is a mixture of realism and placement in the fabric Lot is wearing. On his upper body, the fabric contours to his body and the folds and creases are believable. As the eye scans to his legs, Gentileschi creates an odd placement of the garment on Lot's thigh. The garment has folds and sits bunched up in a way that is not indicative of someone who is laying down. It is almost as if Gentileschi painted it like that solely to highlight his ability to draw complex drapery.

The daughter to the viewer's left seems to protect and shield Lot, while interacting with the scene cut off from the painting. She cradles her father's upper body and shields him both with her right hand that invites his head into her lap, and projects her body forward, leaning over her father and towards her sister. She seems to eagerly point off into the distance, engaging her sister to look at the destruction that is occurring in Sodom out of sight of the viewer; however, while her body is filled with dynamic motion, her hand lazily points giving a faint reminder of the way Adam's finger is outstretched in the Creation of Adam by Michelangelo (Fig. 3). Not only is there lack of tension in her finger, but the daughter has a seemingly apathetic response on her face. She looks neither shocked nor sad but as if she is just saying "hey look" to her sister. This could possibly be attributed to the fact that in the biblical story, Lot and his daughters believed they were going to be the sole survivors of the destruction. Gentileschi takes more care instilling fear and astonishment in her body and ending with apathy in her hand and facial expression. By doing this, Gentileschi cements the reminder that Lot and his daughters know they will be okay in the end. Along with her body, her outfit is dynamic in movement as with the sister to the right. Gentileschi amplifies the creases and folds in her dress and creates a physical body underneath the mass of material showing his mastery of creating realistic body depictions underneath clothing. For example, while the daughter's right foot is not visible to the viewer, is it understandable from the draping of the garment that her right leg is crossed and tucked beneath her left leg and her father's head.

The daughter to the viewer's right reclines in fear away from what the daughter on the left is pointing at as she leans on her father's body for support. Her face, somewhat in profile, is unseen from the viewer as Gentileschi places her back towards us. This allows the viewer to focus on the position of her body and clothing. Her body motion indicates that she is turning towards her family, and it appears as if she is in the process of backing up, while her right leg is bent high towards her chest providing protection and as if it is the leg providing her with the scooting motion away from the unseen image. This daughter is markedly less clothed than Lot and the daughter to the left as her garment falls off her shoulders. Gentileschi takes care to note the folds and creases of the fabric with treatments of shading that indicate the billowy nature of the garment. The viewer could presume that the garment was in the process of falling off while Lot and his daughters race up the landscape in search of a haven. Considering her position in the piece, this daughter would have been the closest to the destruction that unfolded in Sodom, and could have caused her to be in a hurried state leading to her disheveled appearance. The daughter also has a foreshortened appearance in comparison to her sister and father and looks as though if she stretched herself out, she would be shorter than the other two.

== Seven different versions ==
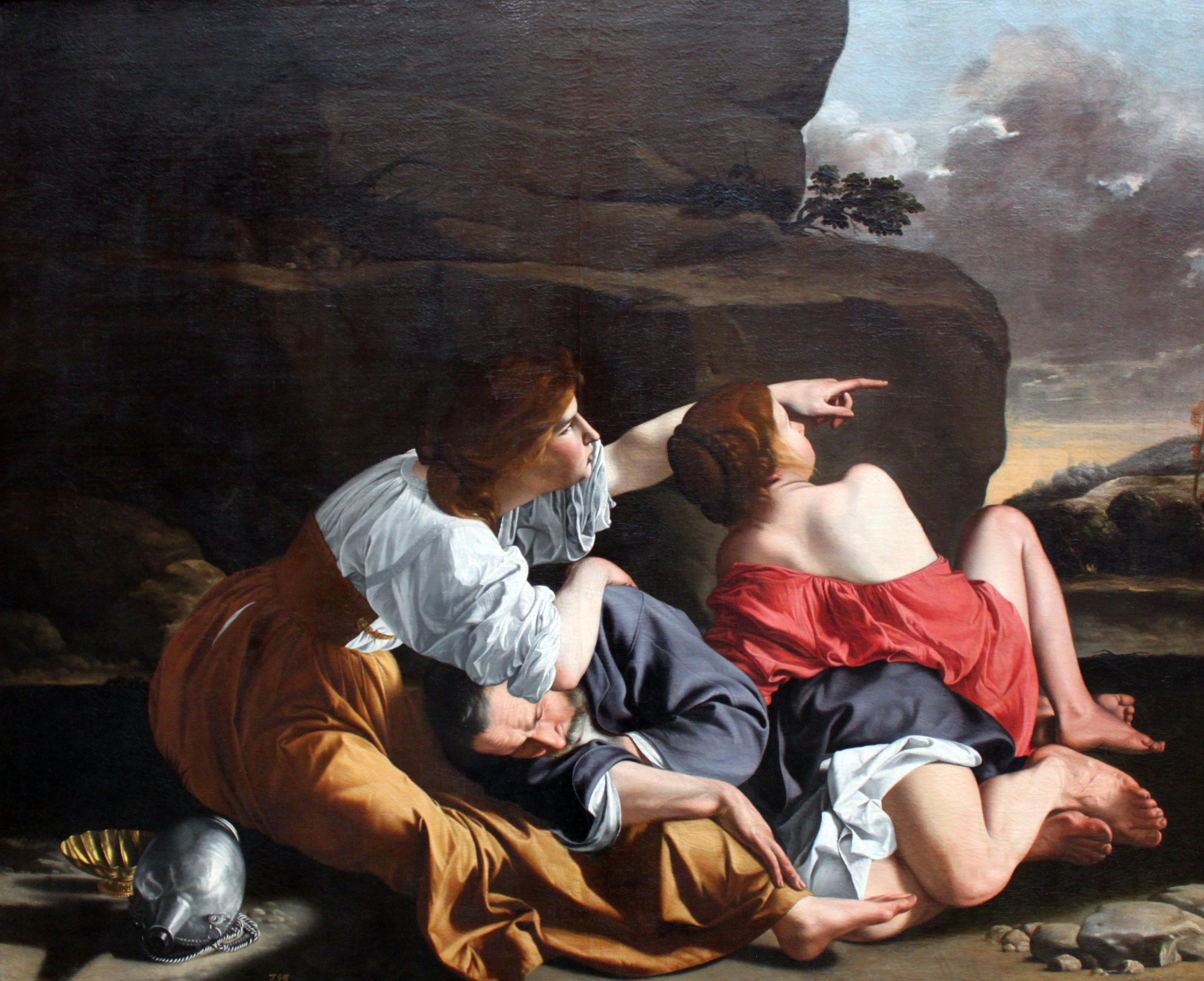
The Berlin version of Lot and His Daughters, in which the colors of the sisters' garments are interchanged.

While the J. Paul Getty Museum houses one of the most important pieces of Gentileschi's career, there are at least seven painted versions and one engraving of this piece. One of the painted versions is held in the Gemäldegalerie, Berlin, while another is in the National Gallery of Canada in Ottawa. Another version is held in the Thyssen-Bornemisza Museum in Madrid; this has been confused with the Getty version, but was in fact painted by Gentileschi's assistants. A similar treatment of the same subject, also titled Lot and His Daughters, is held in the Bilbao Fine Arts Museum in Spain.

The version held in the Berlin Museum is especially intriguing due to the fact that the composition is nearly the same, however an important note is that the colors of the garments of the two daughters are switched between the version in the Getty and the version in the Berlin Museum.

The Lot and His Daughters that currently stands in the Berlin Museum bears exactly the same figural composition as the one in the Getty. Lot is hunched in the lap of the daughter to the left as she points to Sodom and the daughter to the right backs away from the view in the same position. However, the daughter to the left is wearing a yellow dress and the daughter to the right is wearing a red dress which actively changes the mood of the painting.

== Symbolism ==
Gentileschi's simple composition is filled with subtle, but poignant forms of symbolism that comprise both the individual piece, as well as bringing together the other two pieces in the set. The use of primary colors is a striking feature in the composition itself. Gentileschi uses the primary colors red yellow and blue and gives each figure in the composition their own color. Lot receives blue, the daughter to the left receives red and the daughter to the right receives yellow. The color attribute seems to be unimportant, however, these colors are the only colors that cannot be created through the mixing of other colors. They are the basis for every color that can occur on the color wheel, and it makes sense that Gentileschi would give each figure these colors because, in the history of Lot and his daughters, they are the only individuals that survive the world as they know it and must repopulate. Gentileschi is able to use color as a symbol for origin, making sure the viewer knows that Lot and his daughters are the progenitors of "their world".

Nudity also has a symbolic role in the piece, and there is a noticeable descending order in which the amount of clothing decreases in the figures from left to right. The daughter to the left is the most clothed, then Lot bears more skin, and then the daughter to the right has her garment nearly exposing her. After Lot's daughters realize there are no more men on earth to reproduce with they hatch a plan to get their father drunk for two consecutive days, and after he is drunk, they lay with him to get pregnant. Gentileschi foreshadows the incestuous relationship that Lot and his daughters will partake in by creating a combination of multiple scenes of the story. The combination of scenes in the painting consist of the daughters looking on in the distance, and their decision to have intercourse with their father, evidenced by Lot's drunkenness and the daughter to the right already in the process of disrobing.

The inclusion of a physical symbol in the piece shows Gentileschi's flair in combining both literal and figurative symbols in the painting. The literal symbols in Gentileschi's piece are limited to the jug and cup in the lower left-hand corner of the painting. The jug is open, overturned, and empty next to a cup that is also empty making a reference to the plot that the daughters hatched to get Lot drunk. It also refers to the loss of both daughters' purity. When they set their plan in motion, this is the beginnings of the process of becoming impure as they will soon lose their virginity. The literal symbols in reference to the story are coincidentally the ones that Gentileschi "hid" the most as they are tucked away in the corner. Meanwhile, the subtlest ones – such as the choice of color and foreshadowing – are the ones that draw attention unbeknownst to the viewer. It is possible that Gentileschi intentionally did this to create a poetic composition.

=== Color theory ===
Red is considered an "active" color. Red usually symbolizes passion, energy, and danger. Yellow symbolizes freshness, and optimism, but yellow also represents cowardice and caution. It is interesting that in the Berlin version, the daughter who is pointing is wearing a yellow garment, she is actively engaging towards the danger, leaning her body in closer to the destruction even though she is further away – almost lacking fear of what's happening as she urges her sister to look. The daughter to the right wearing red is backing away from everything. It is highly possible that this version with this color selection was not favored by either Sauli or Gentileschi. The Getty version where the daughter passionately pointing out engaging towards the destruction is wearing red seems much more fitting and balances the composition much better. It would also make sense that the daughter to the right wears yellow as she is exacting extreme caution by trying to remove herself as far away from the destruction and she moves backwards, and also represents her feelings of terror, which is also represented in the color yellow. Assumedly, Lot most likely stayed blue as he brings balance and stability to the piece between the push and pull composition of the daughters. He and his garment color also represents calmness as he is oblivious to his surroundings.

The version in the Berlin Museum also contains a higher use of contrast which is evident in the way the light creates a deep shadow on the garment of the daughter to the left of Lot. The backside of her is almost completely in shadow where her face barely makes it into the light where Lot and the other daughter are illuminated. The vase and the chalice that sit beside the daughter to the left are also highly illuminated and backed by their intense shadow in the corner whereas in the Getty version, they do not pose as much importance because Gentileschi chooses not to create such high contrast.

== See also ==
- List of works by Orazio Gentileschi
