= Lot and His Daughters (Vouet) =

1633 painting by Simon Vouet

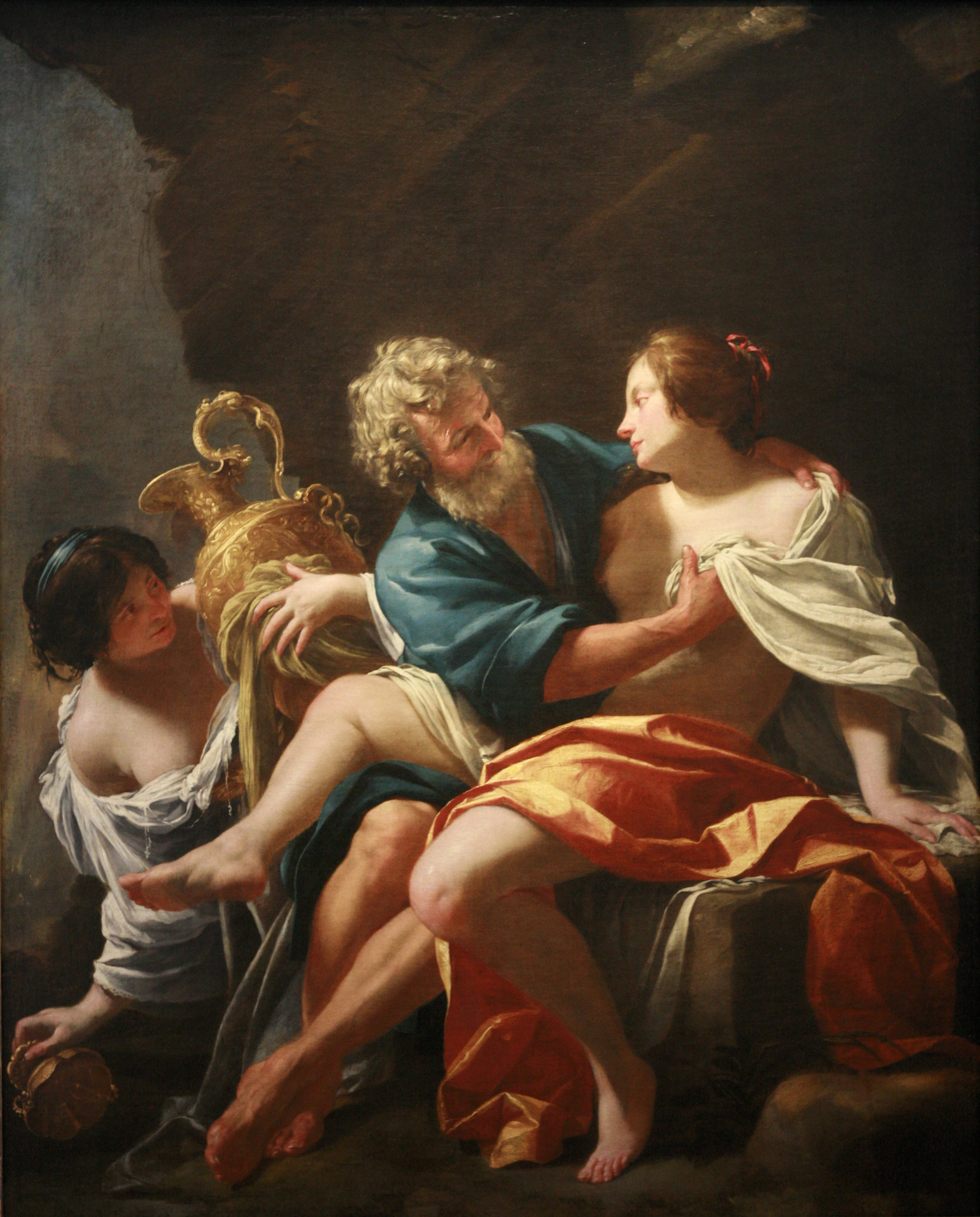
- Artist: Simon Vouet
- Year: 1633
- Medium: oil painting on canvas
- Movement: Baroque; History painting
- Subject: Lot and his daughters
- Dimensions: 160 cm × 130 cm (63 in × 51 in)
- Location: Musée des Beaux-Arts, Strasbourg
- Accession: 1937

Lot and His Daughters is a 1633 oil-on-canvas painting of Lot and his daughters by the French artist Simon Vouet, now in the Musée des Beaux-Arts de Strasbourg.

It depicts the Book of Genesis story in which, after the destruction of Sodom by divine judgment, Lot and his daughters take refuge in a cave. The daughters, believing that there are no men with whom to have offspring, get their father drunk and commit incest with him, one each night, subsequently becoming pregnant.

The subject, judged as shameful in the Middle Ages, was not explicitly represented, but since the Renaissance it was depicted frequently, because of the opportunity it offered to artists to depict an erotic subject.
