= Lot and His Daughters (Artemisia Gentileschi) =

Painting by Artemisia Gentileschi

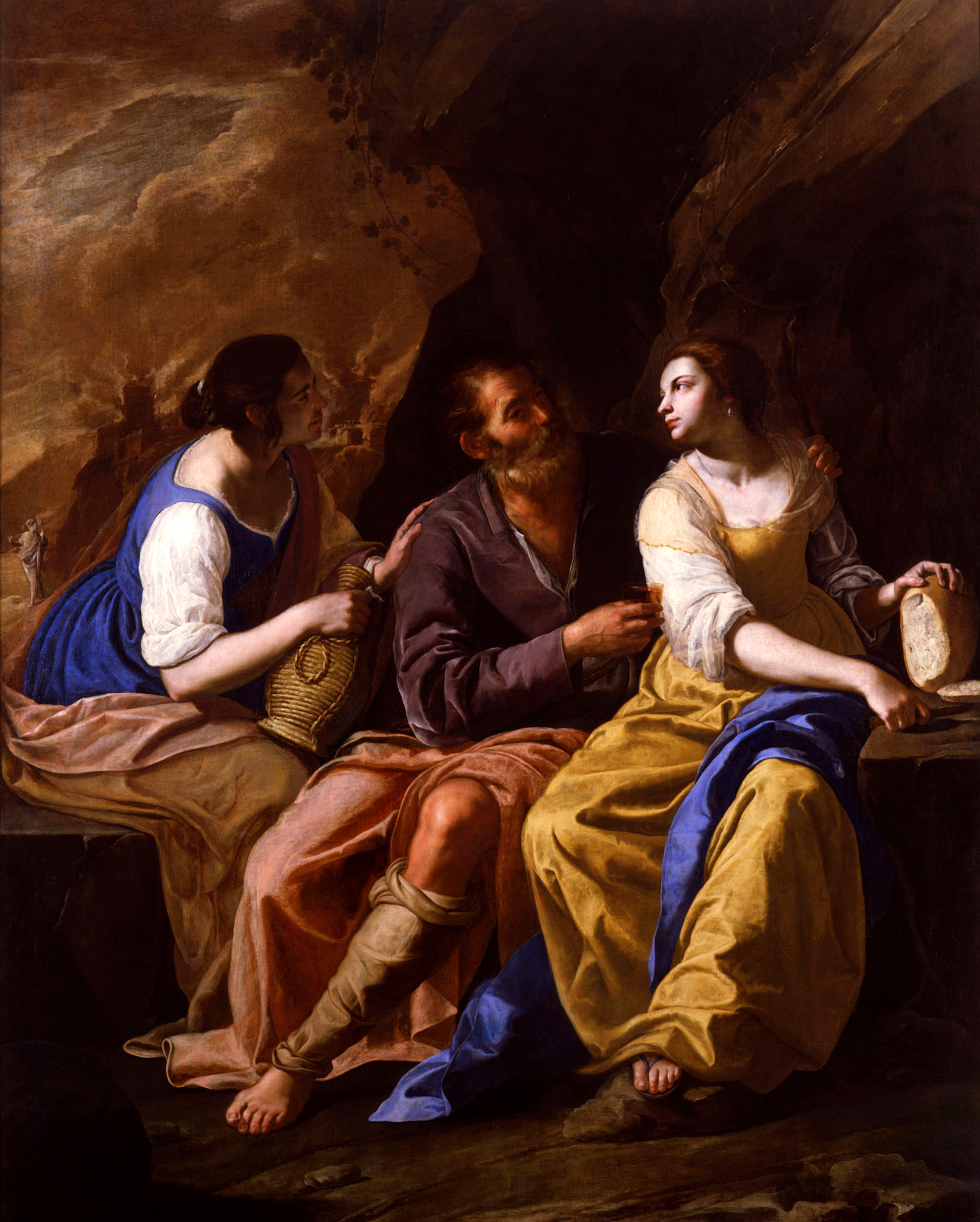
- Artist: Artemisia Gentileschi
- Year: c. 1636-8
- Medium: Oil on canvas
- Dimensions: 230.5 cm × 182.9 cm (90.7 in × 72.0 in)
- Location: Toledo Museum of Art, Toledo, Ohio

Lot and His Daughters is a 1636-1638 painting by Artemisia Gentileschi, now in the Toledo Museum of Art.

== Description ==
=== Subject matter ===
The story, recounted in the Book of Genesis, concerns the family of Lot who have fled the destroyed city of Sodom (visible burning in the background of the painting). Lot's wife disobeyed instructions not to look around and was turned into a pillar of salt – her form is just visible in the left background of the painting. Lot and his daughters then hid in a cave; the daughters, fearing the end of their family line, then got their father drunk, so they could seduce him and perpetuate their lineage. This theme was popular in art of the period, both for its moral message as well as its scandalous potential.

=== Composition ===
Lot sits between his daughters in a darkened landscape. He wears a purple garment with a pink cloak, with his left knee exposed as the cloth falls away. His daughters lean towards him, one with a gold gown and blue cloak, while the other has a blue gown and gold cloak. One daughter offers to refill his wine glass while the other prepares to slice bread.

== Provenance ==
Scholars suspect the painting may once have been in the collection of Luigi Romeo, Barone of San Luigi, Naples, during the 18th century. It was sold from a private collection in Switzerland in 1982 and was purchased the following year by the present owner.

== Attribution ==
The painting has only relatively recently been attributed to Gentileschi. Its authorship has been the subject of scholarly debate since it was first purchased by the Toledo Museum of Art and exhibited in 1984 as a work of Bernardo Cavallini; the Toledo Museum has since changed the painting's attribution to Gentileschi. Domenico Gargiulo has also been mentioned by some art historians, such as Raymond Ward Bissell, as possibly having contributed to the background of the painting.

== See also ==
- List of works by Artemisia Gentileschi
