= Lot's daughters =

Biblical figures

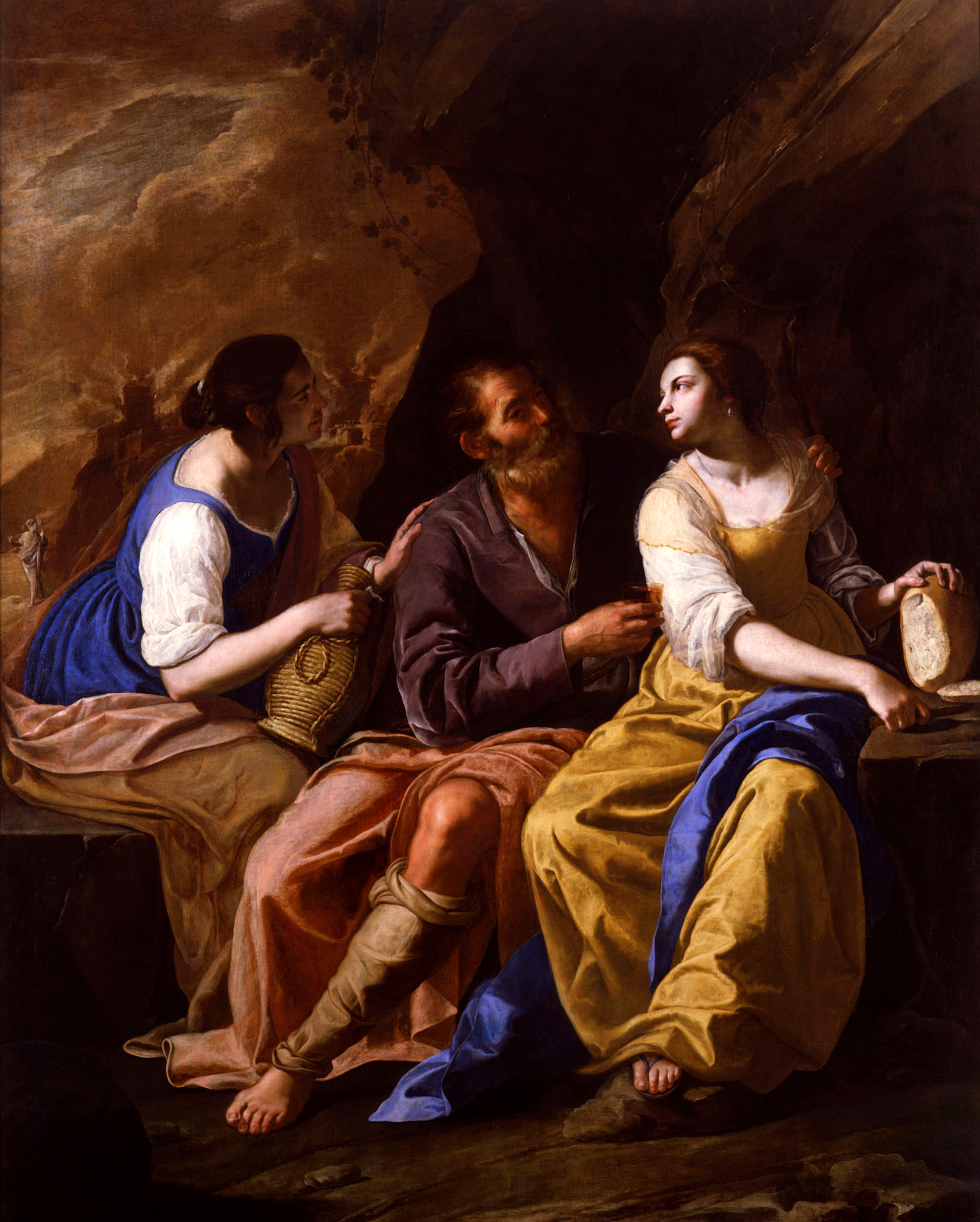
Lot and His Daughters by Artemisia Gentileschi, c. 1635–38

The daughters of the biblical patriarch Lot appear in chapter 19 of the Book of Genesis in two connected stories. In the first, Lot offers his daughters to a Sodomite mob; in the second, the daughters intoxicate him and have sex with him without his knowledge, in order to bear him children.

Only two daughters are explicitly mentioned in Genesis, both unnamed. However, the midrashic Sefer HaYashar describes another daughter by the name of Paltith, who is burned to death by the Sodomites for breaking their law against giving charity to foreigners. The story of Lut offering his daughters to the Sodomites are different in the Quran however. When angels came with their motive to destroy the people of Lut, they came as handsome men. A prophet is like a father-figure to the nation he was sent. So, in surahs 11 and 15 of the Quran, he offered the daughters of the nation to sodomite mob to marry so that they would refrain from doing unlawful acts to the angels. Although there is no mention of the daughters' act of incest in the Quran.

== In the Book of Genesis ==
In Genesis 19, Lot shows hospitality to two angels who arrive in Sodom, and invites them to stay the night at his house. However, the men of the city gather around the house and demand that Lot hand over his guests so they can "know them". Lot admonishes them for their wickedness, and offers the mob his two virgin daughters instead. When the mob refuses Lot's offer, the angels strike them with blindness, and then warn Lot to leave the city before it is destroyed.

Verse 14 states that Lot has sons-in-law, "which married his daughters". This seems to contradict the earlier statement that his daughters were virgins. According to the NIV translation, these men were only "pledged to marry" his daughters. Robert Alter suggests that the reference in verse 15 to "your two daughters who remain with you" indicates that Lot's two virgin daughters left the city with him, but that he had other, married daughters who stayed behind with the sons-in-law.

The King James Version (KJV) and the New Revised Standard Version (NRSV) describe the older surviving daughter as "the firstborn", while the Contemporary English Version (CEV) uses "the older".

During the escape from Sodom, Lot's wife turns into a pillar of salt. Lot and his daughters take shelter in Zoar, but afterwards go up into the mountains to live in a cave. Concerned for their father having descendants, one evening, they get Lot drunk and his eldest daughter has sex with him without his knowledge. The following night, they get him drunk again and the younger daughter sleeps with him. They both become pregnant; the older daughter gives birth to Moab, while the younger daughter gives birth to Ammon.

According to Jewish tradition, Lot's daughters believed that the entire world had been destroyed, and that they were the only survivors. They therefore resorted to incest in order to preserve the human race. This was also the general opinion of the Early Church Fathers, such as Augustine, Chrysostom and Irenaeus. The basis of this idea is the comment of the elder daughter that "there is not a man in the earth" to give them children. However, commentators such as John Calvin have pointed out that the family had only recently dwelt in Zoar, so they must have known they were not the only people left alive. Calvin therefore concludes that the elder daughter's remark refers not to the whole earth, but only to the region in which they were living.

Many scholars have drawn a connection between the two episodes of Lot's daughters. According to Robert Alter, this final episode "suggests measure-for-measure justice meted out for his rash offer".

A number of commentators describe the actions of Lot's daughters as rape. According to Esther Fuchs, the text presents Lot's daughters as the "initiators and perpetrators of the incestuous 'rape'". Alter agrees, adding that when the elder daughter says "let us lie with him", the meaning of the Hebrew verb in this context "seems close to 'rape'".

== In the Quran ==
The story of Lot offering his daughters to the Sodomites is also found in surahs 11 and 15 of the Quran. Islamic commentators generally interpret these passages to mean that Lot offered his daughters in lawful marriage. The Sodomites' refusal of the offer is explained in various ways, such as that Lot insisted that anyone who married his daughters must first convert to his religion; or that the Sodomites had been refused permission to marry his daughters in the past, and therefore had no legal right to them now.

A variation on the marriage theory holds that the phrase "my daughters" should be taken in a metaphorical sense. Lot, as a prophet, is considered a father to his people; he is therefore inviting the Sodomites to intermarry with the women of his nation.

The story of Lot's incestuous relationship with his daughters is not alluded to in the Quran.

== In art ==
Lot's sexual relationship with his daughters was a theme seldom explored in medieval art. In the sixteenth century, however, the story became popular with European artists, primarily due to its erotic potential. Depictions of Lot and his daughters in this era were generally charged with sexuality; the daughters would often be painted as nudes, and Lot would be portrayed (in contradiction to the Bible narrative) as "either a happily compliant figure or an aggressive seducer".

=== Gallery ===
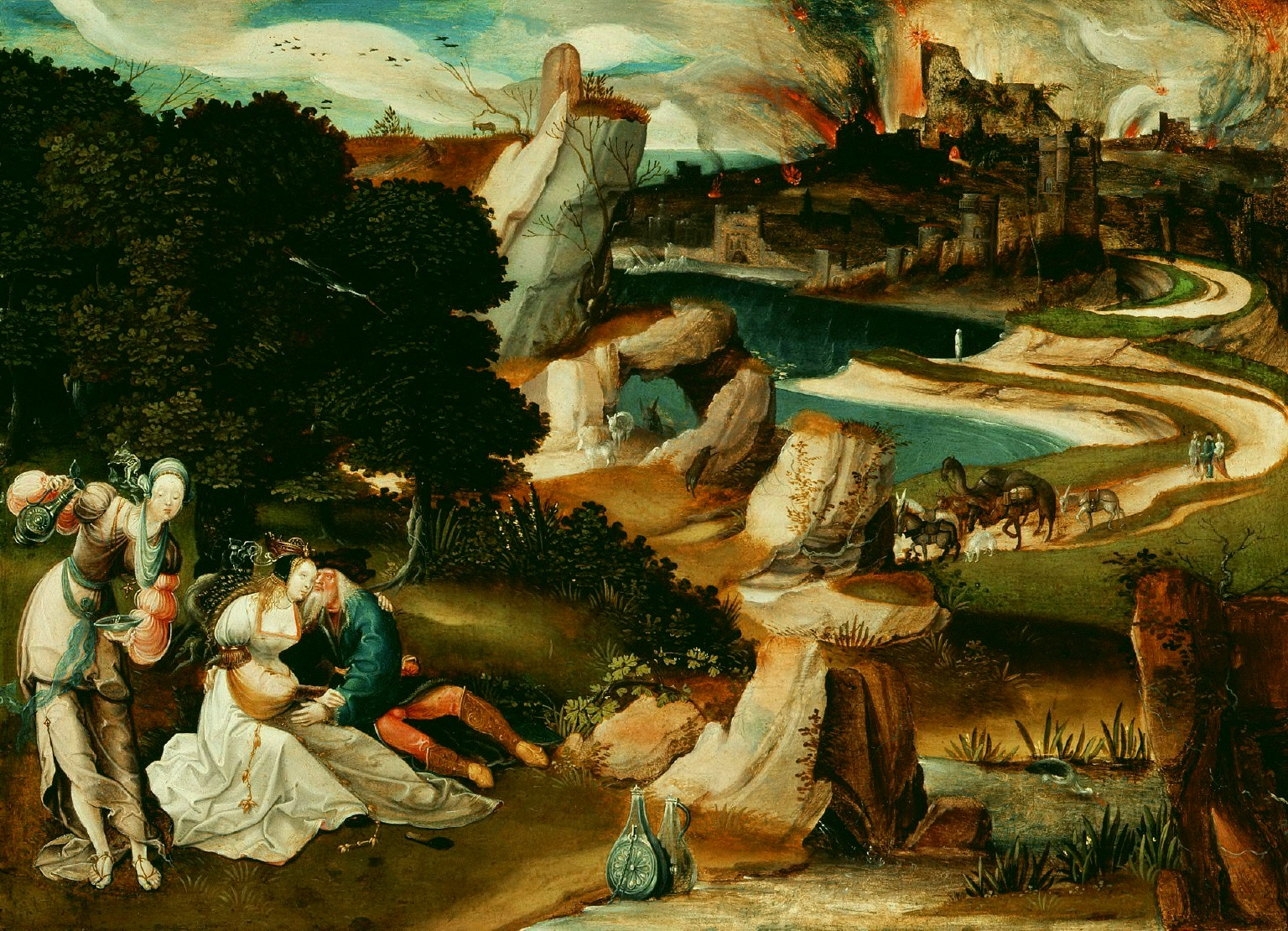
Jan Wellens de Cock, 1523

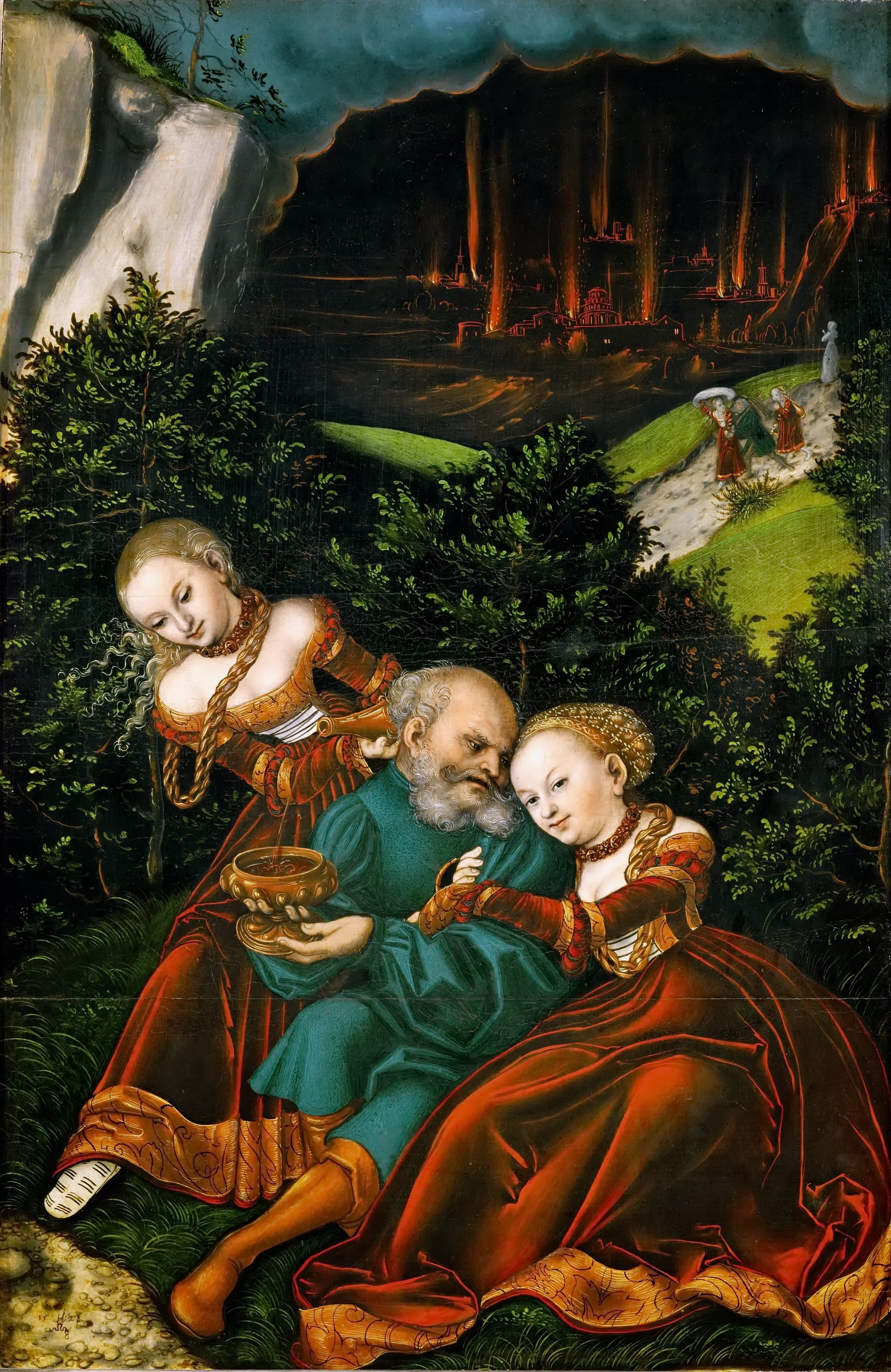
Lucas Cranach the Elder, 1528

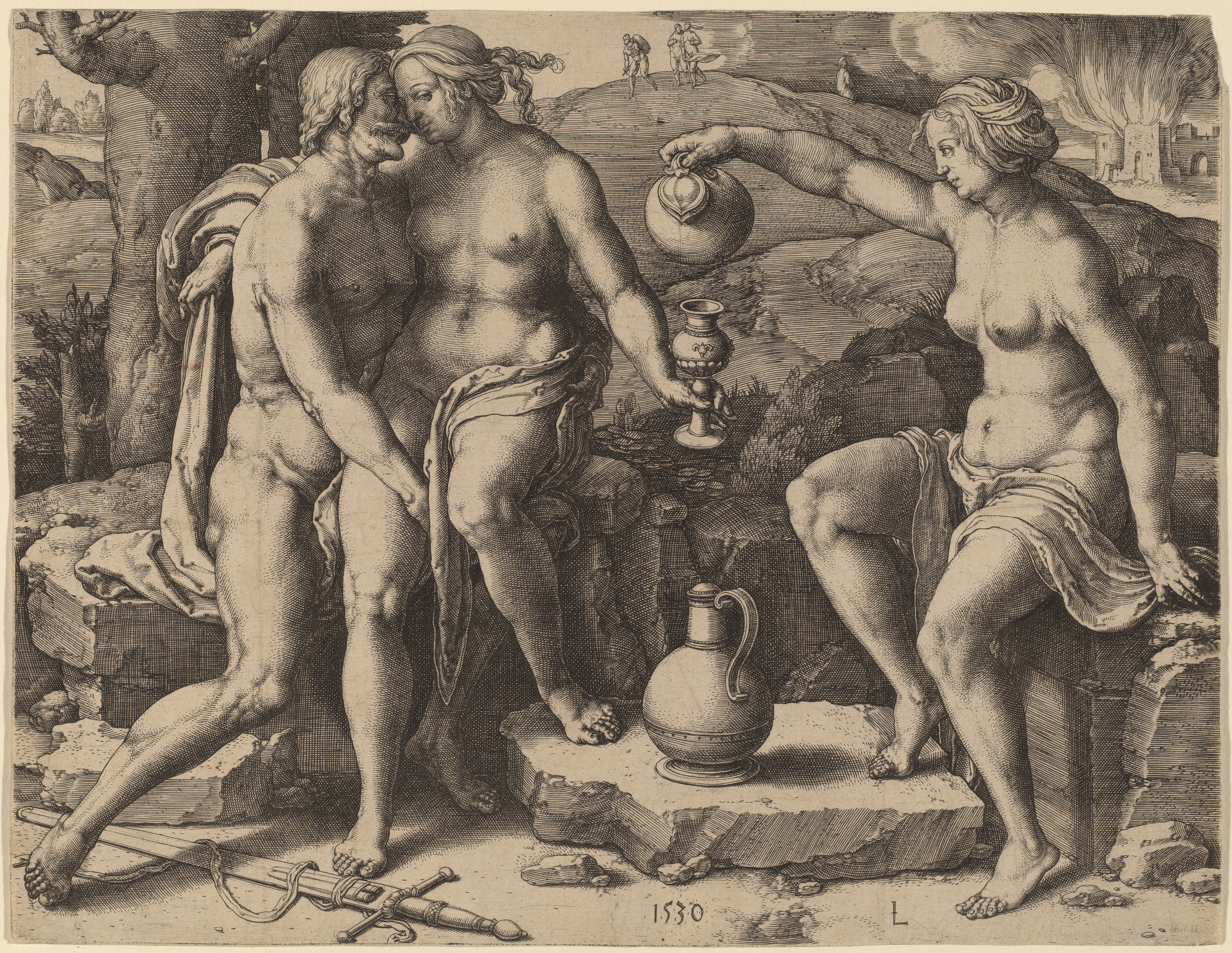
Lucas van Leyden, 1530

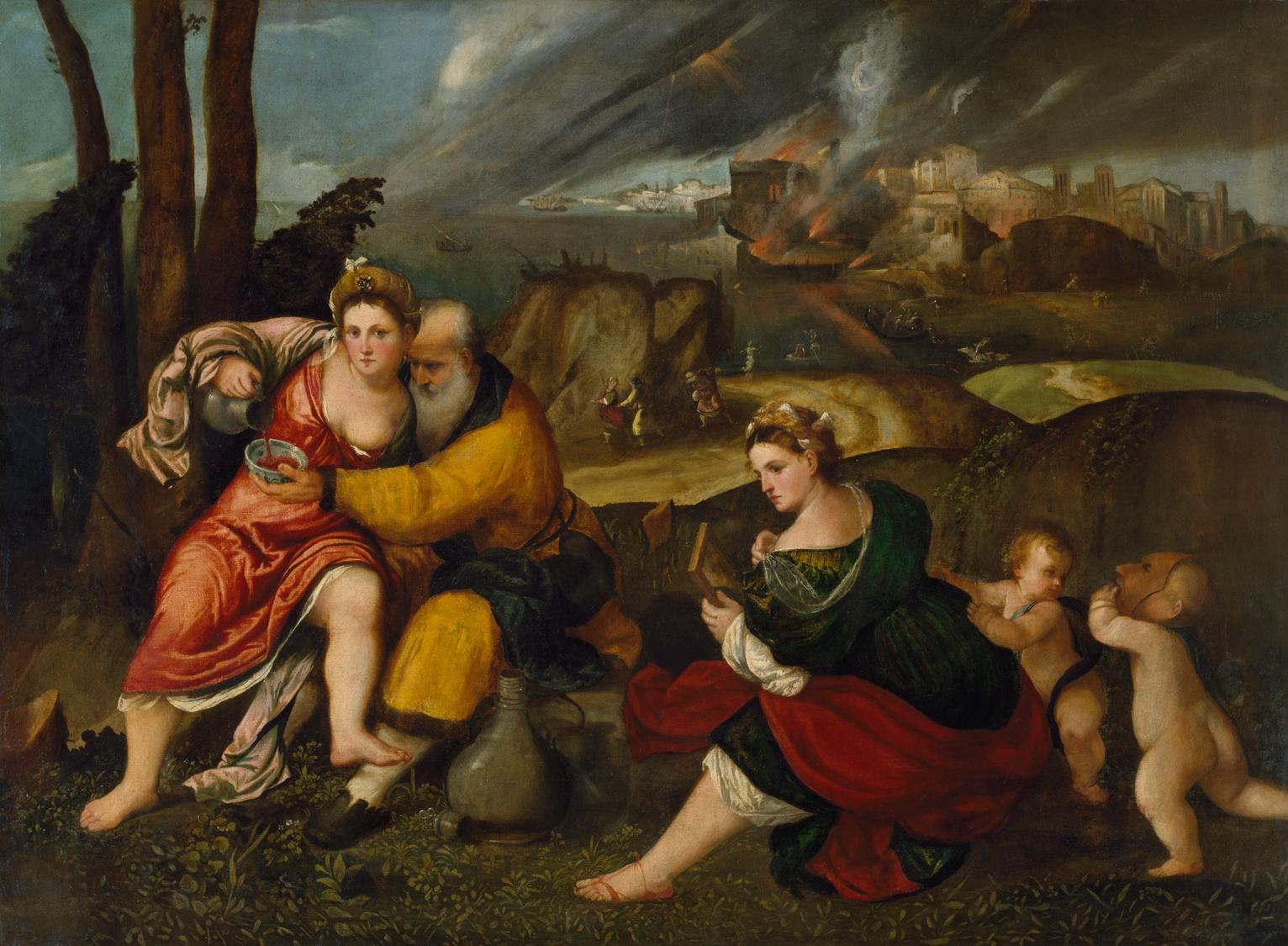
Bonifazio Veronese, 1545

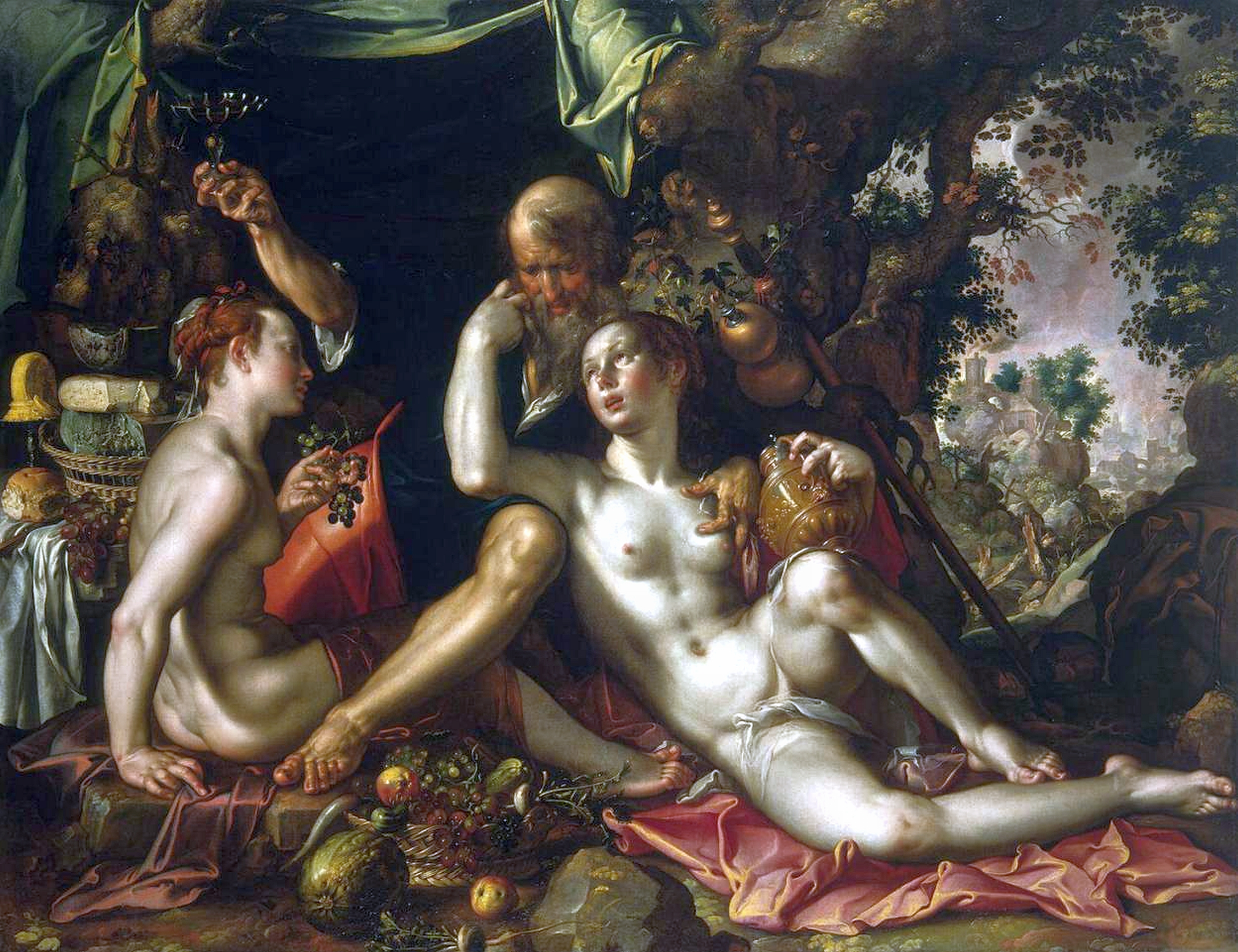
Joachim Wtewael, c. 1600

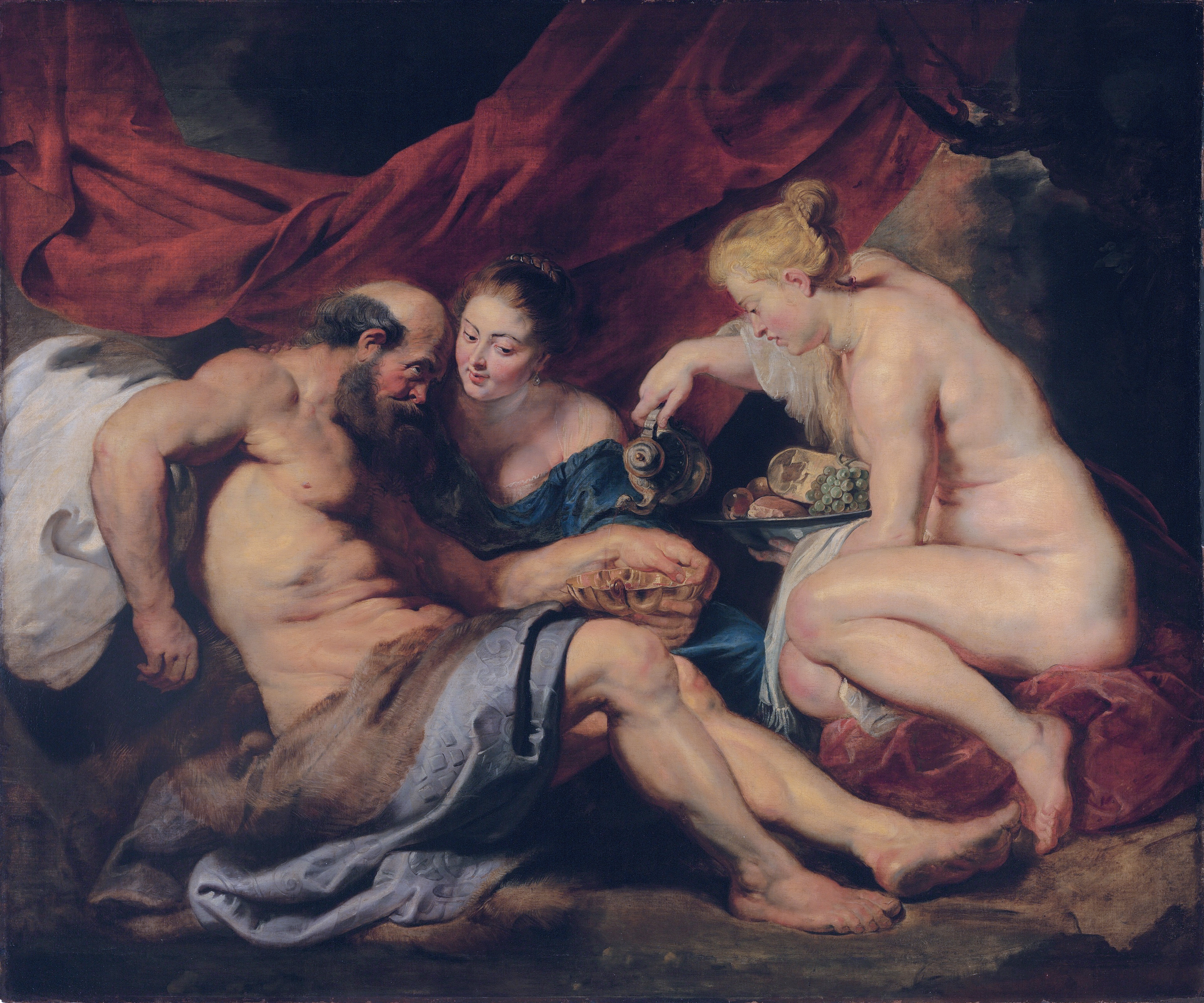
Peter Paul Rubens, c. 1613-14

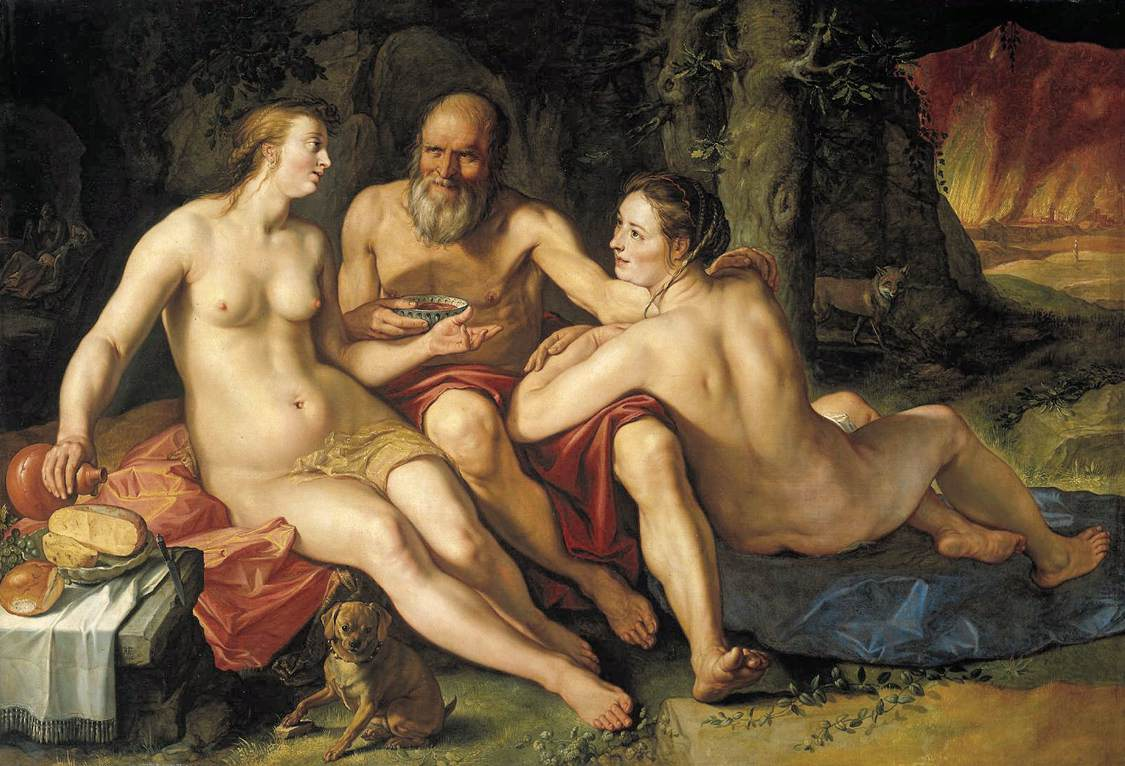
Hendrick Goltzius, 1616

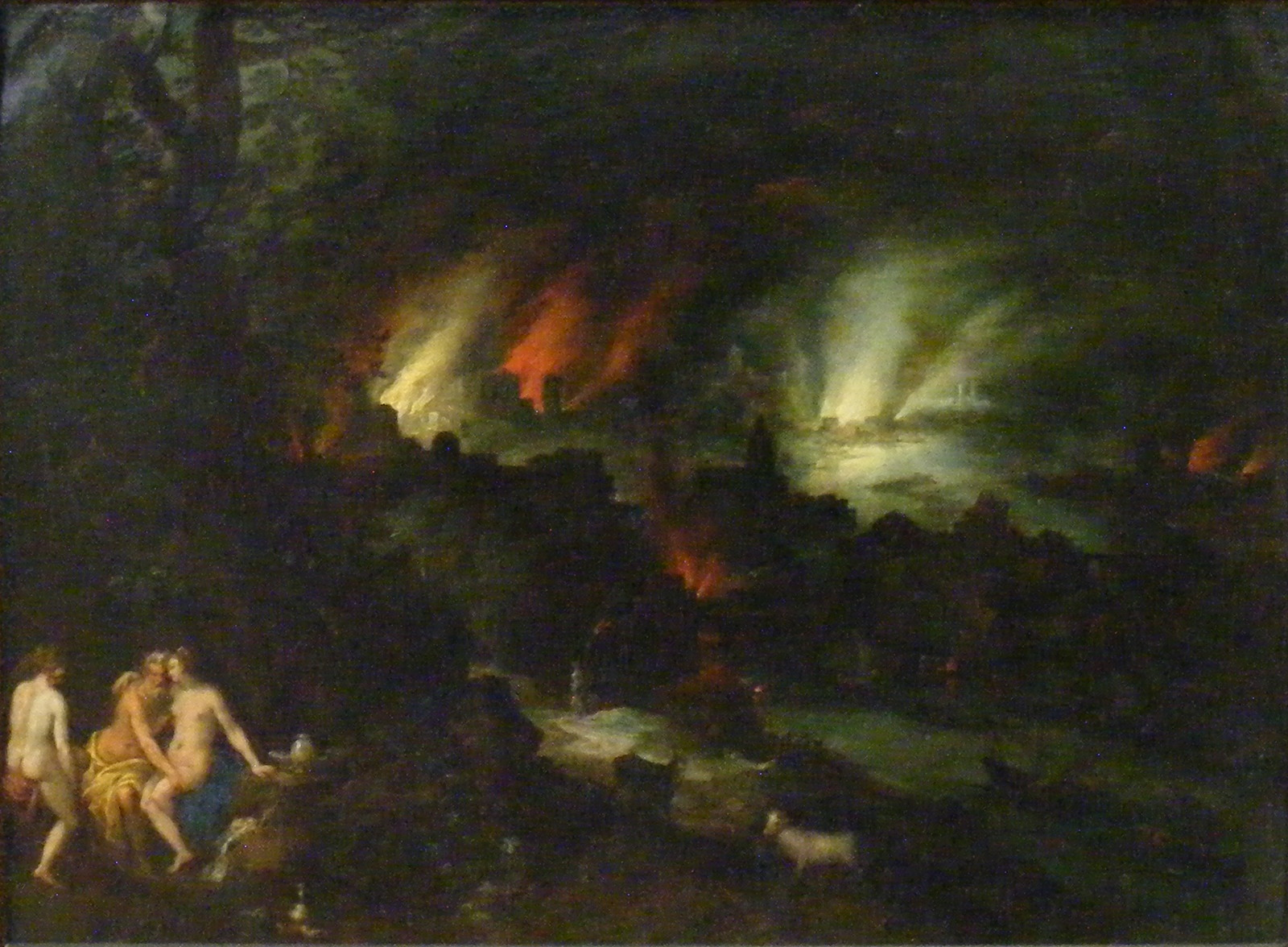
Jan Brueghel the Elder, 17th century

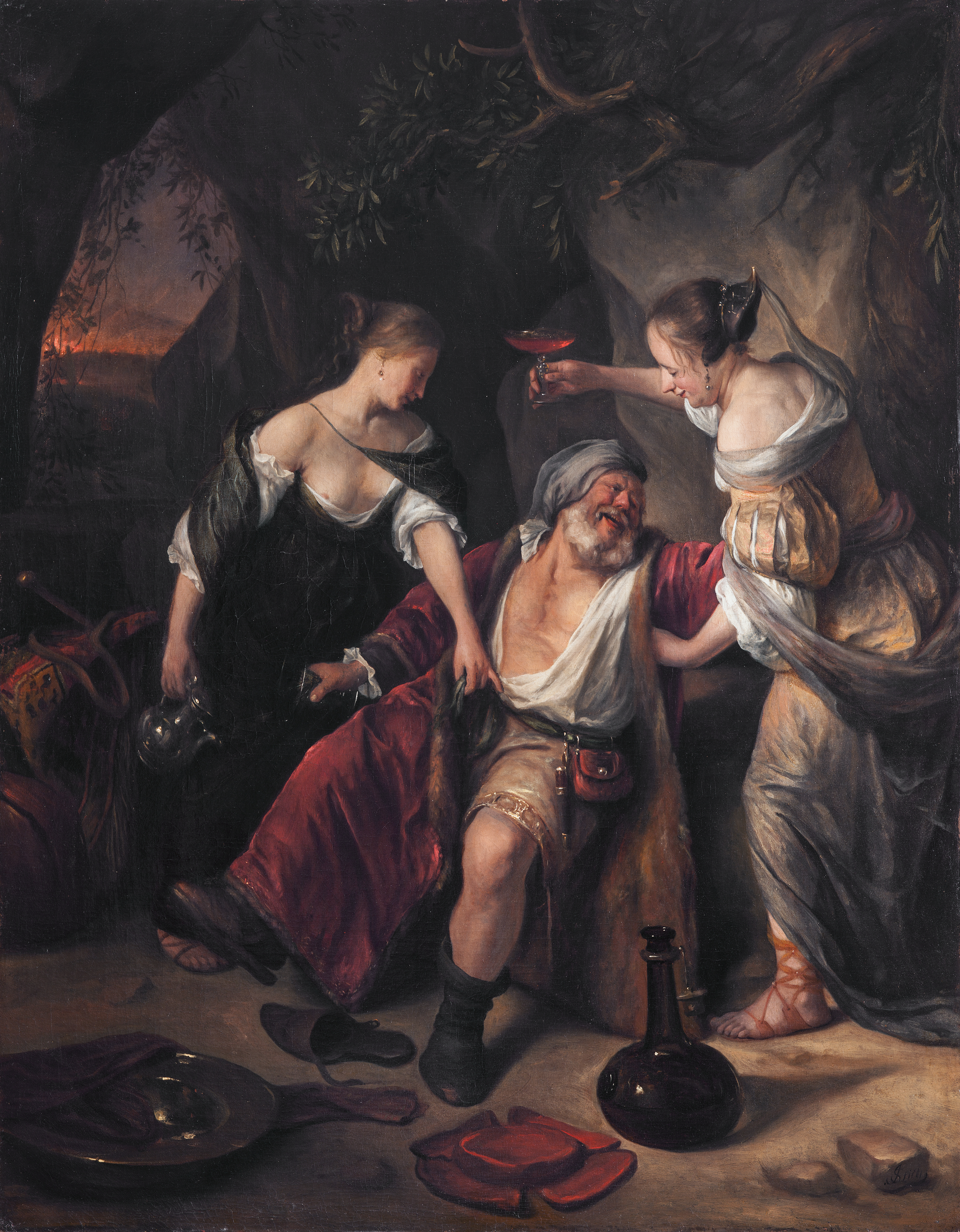
Jan Steen, c. 1665-7

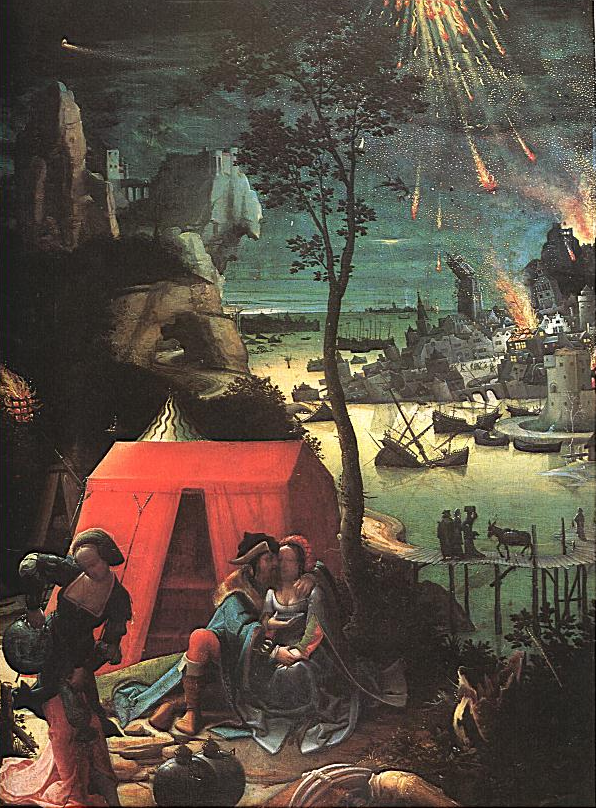
Lot and His Daughters (anonymous)

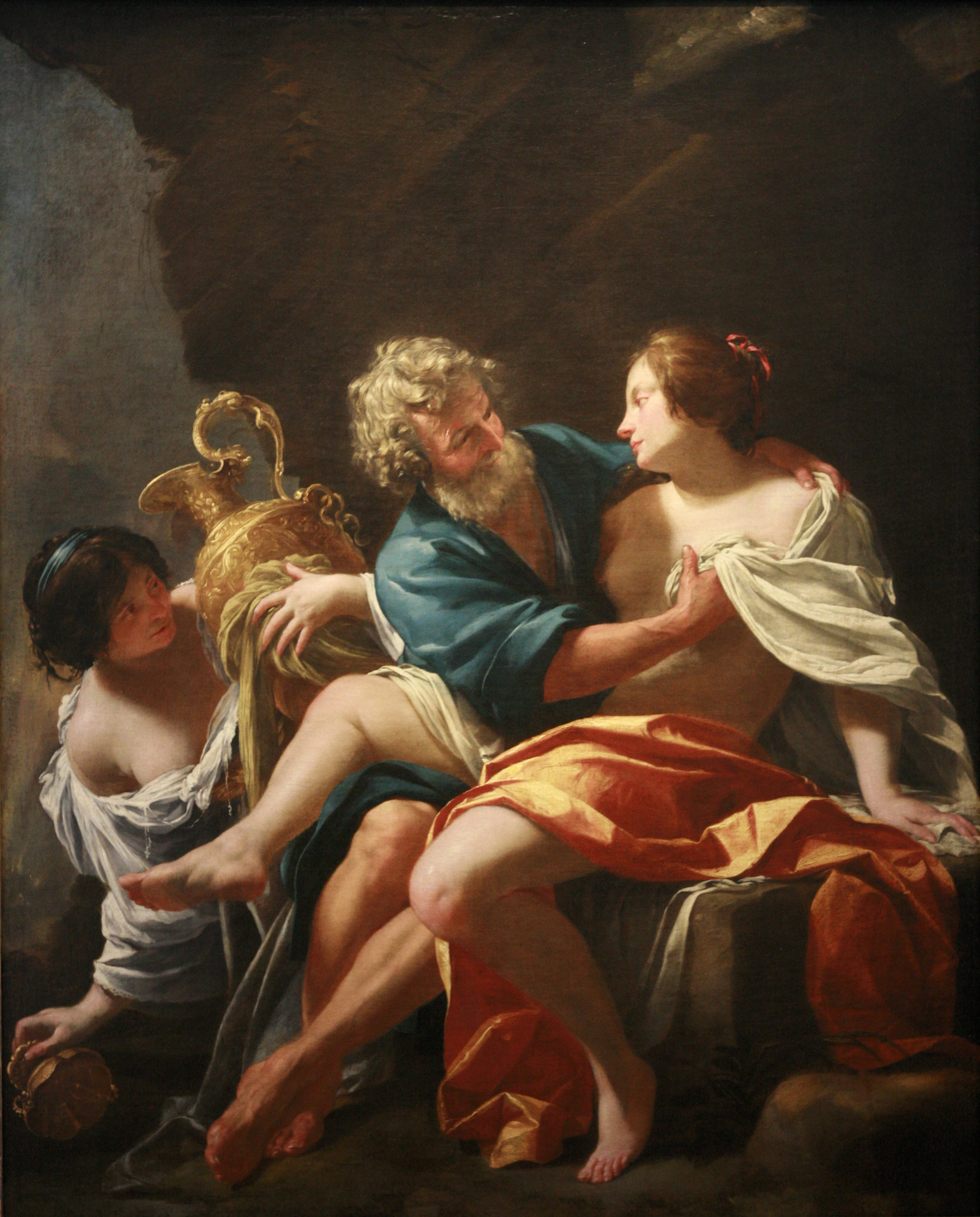
Lot and His Daughters (Vouet)

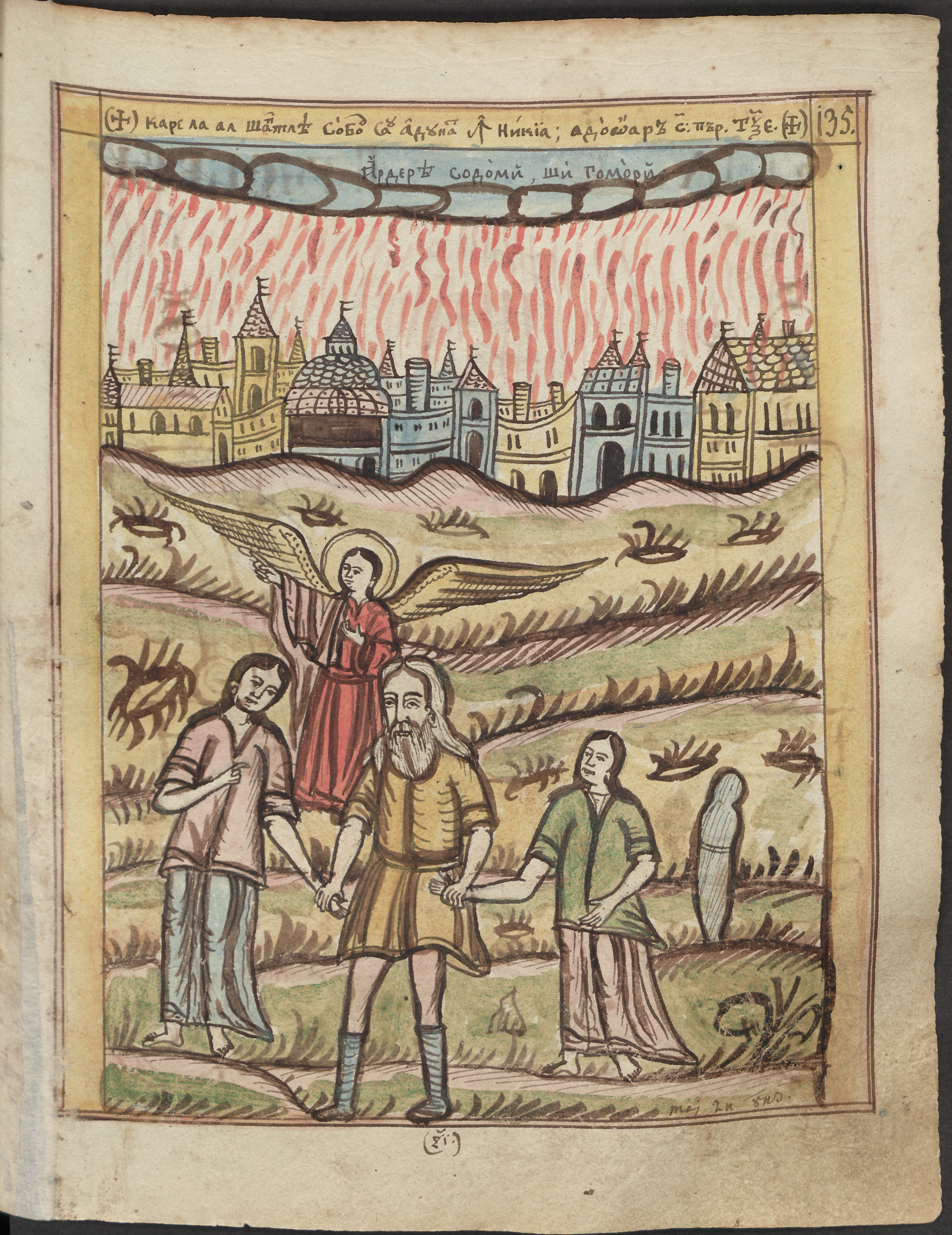
Lot and his Daughters, with Sodom and Gomorrah Burning (miniature from Transylvania)

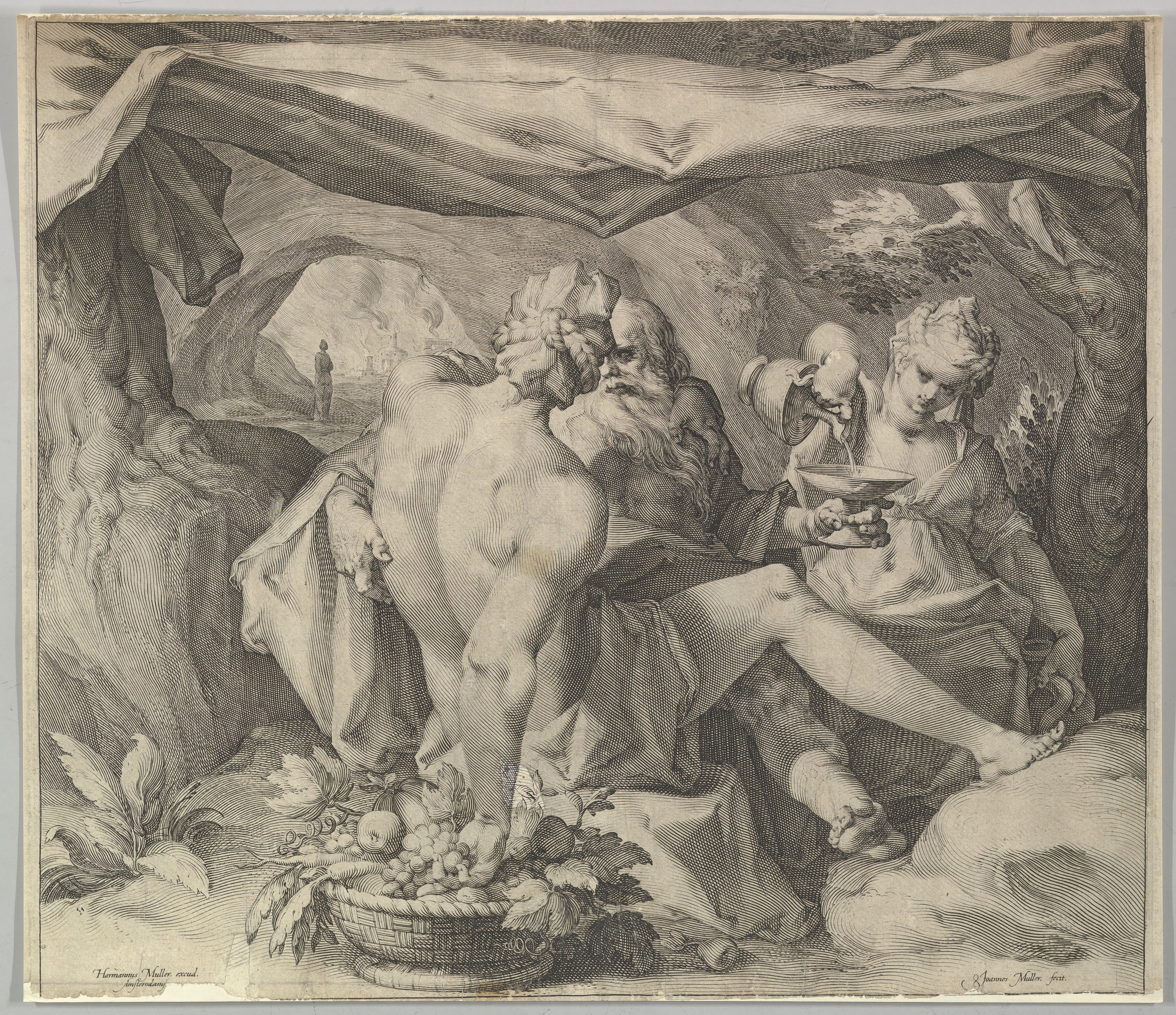

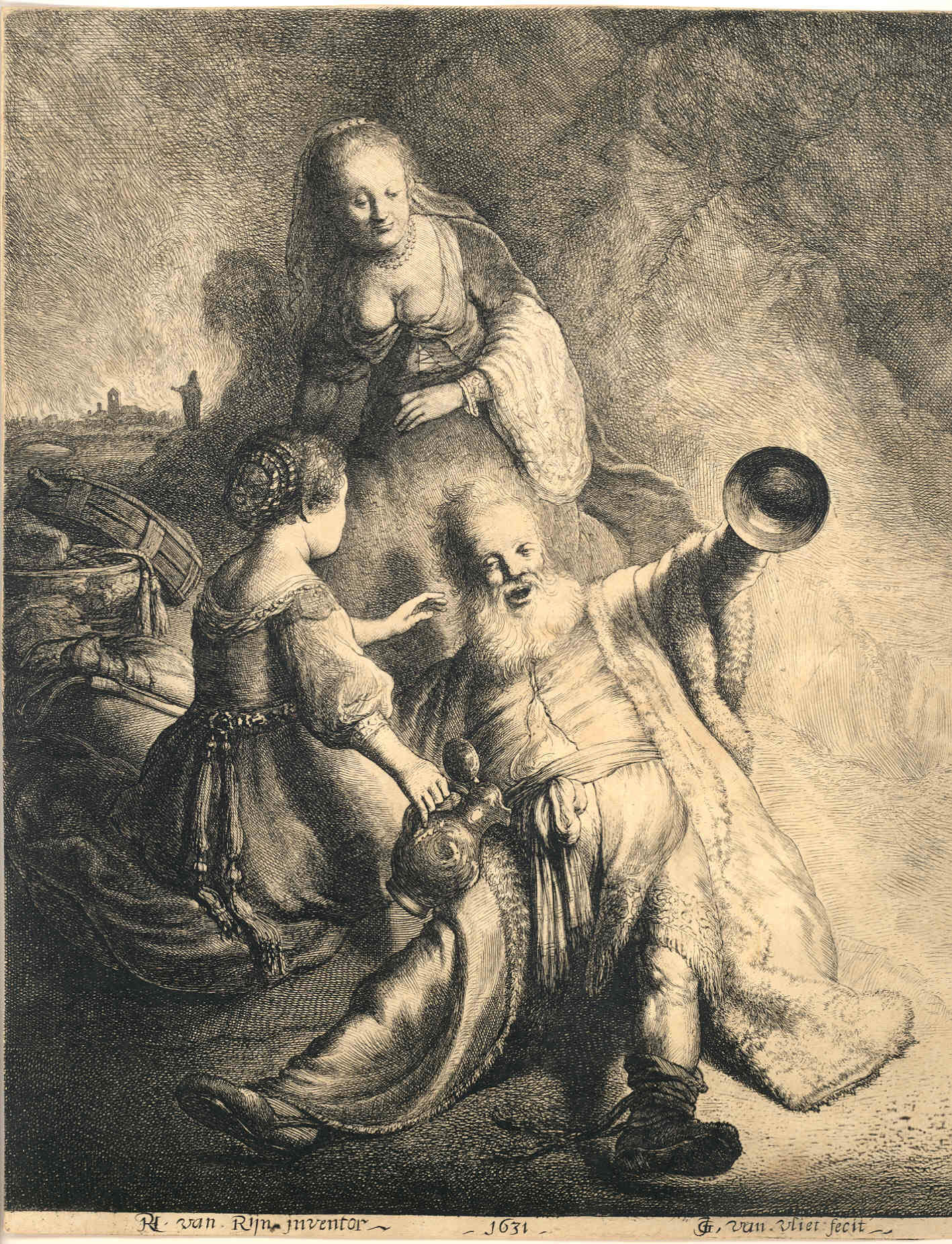

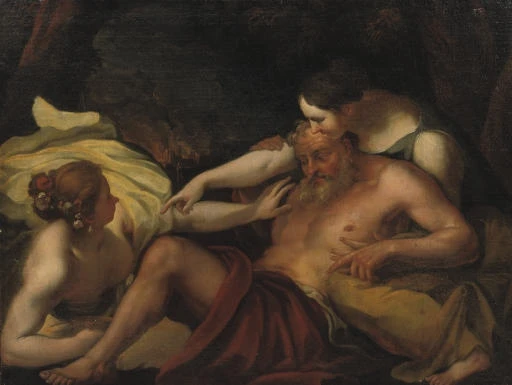

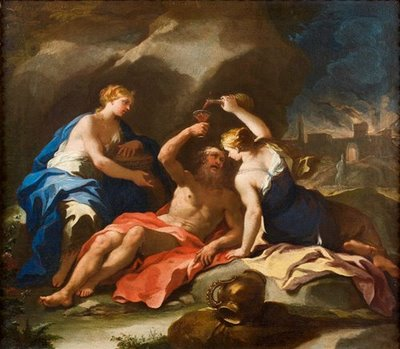

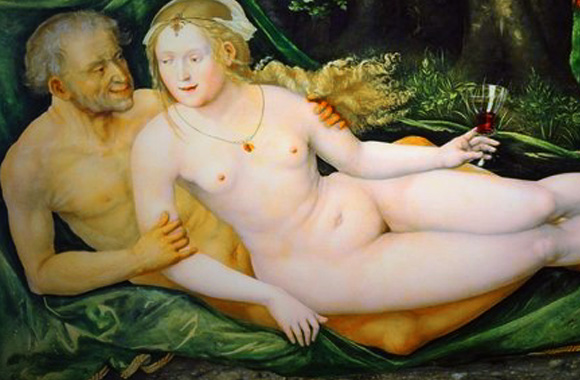

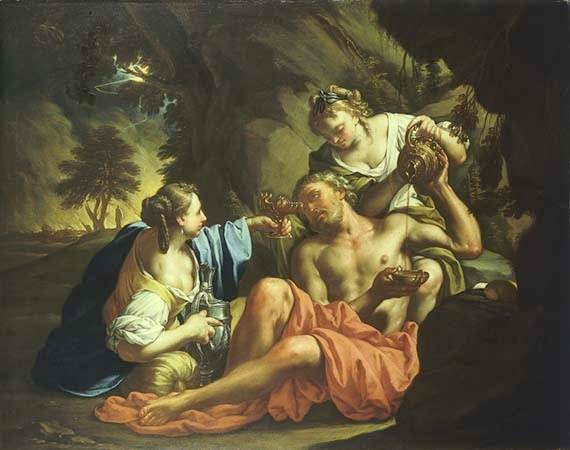

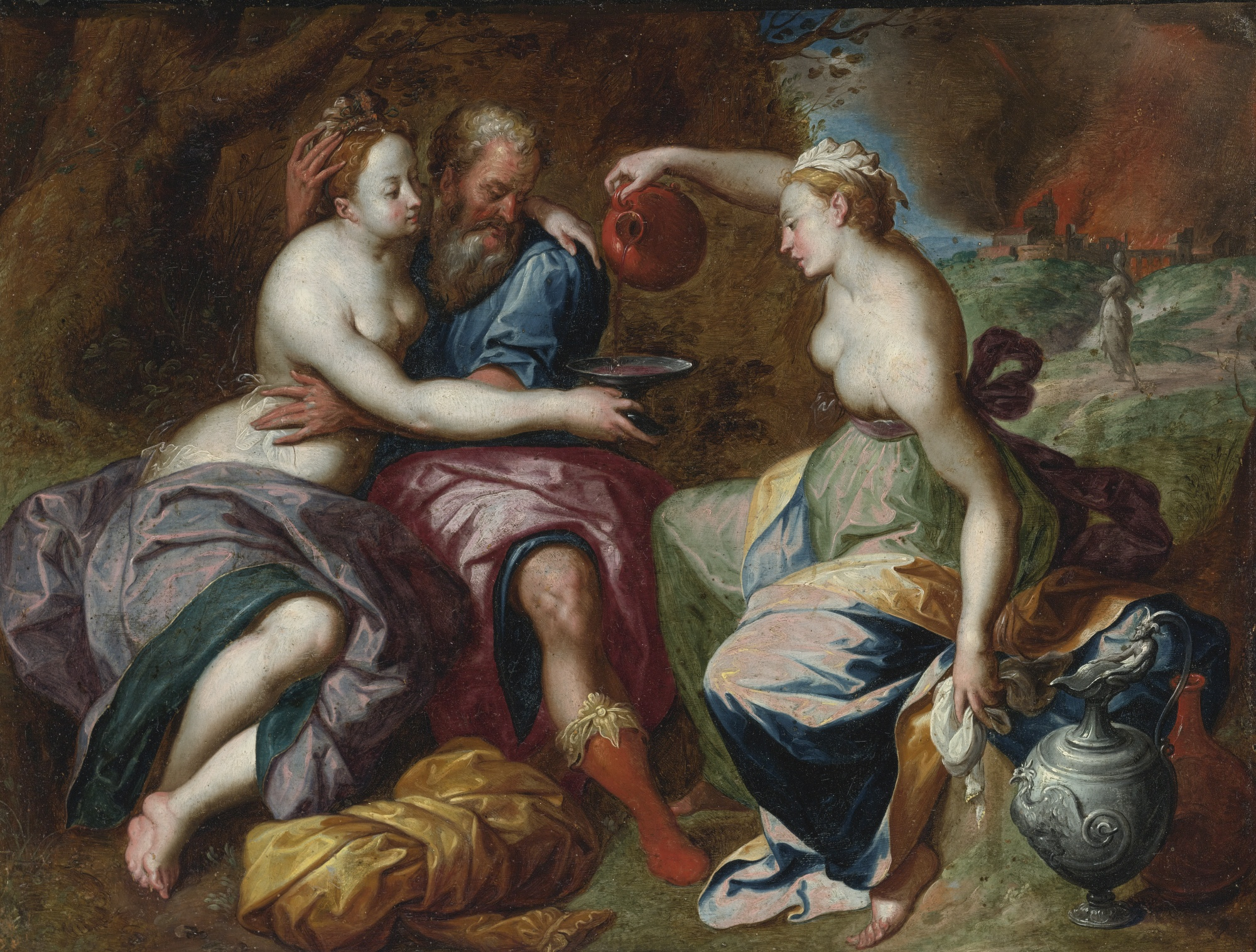

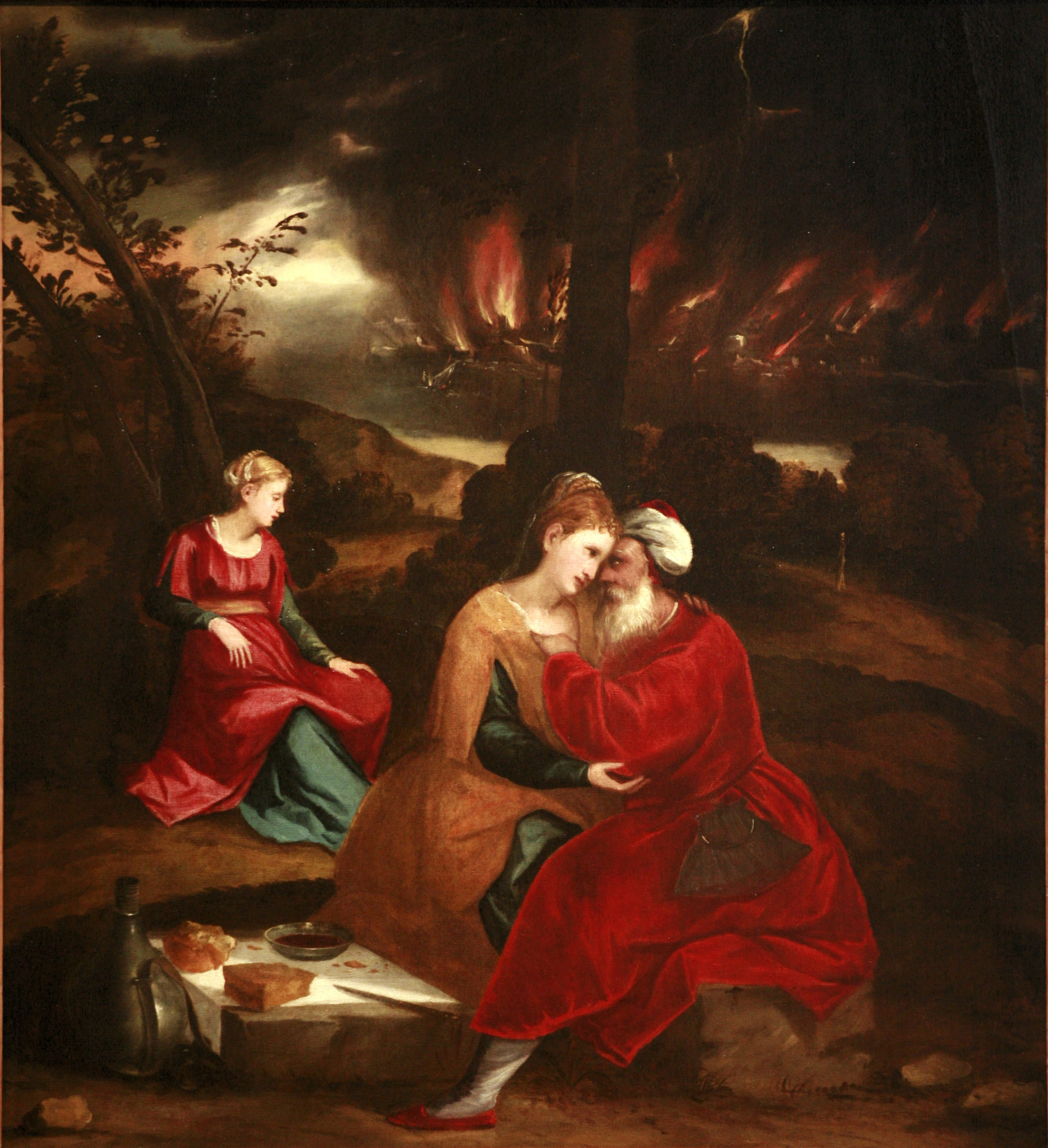

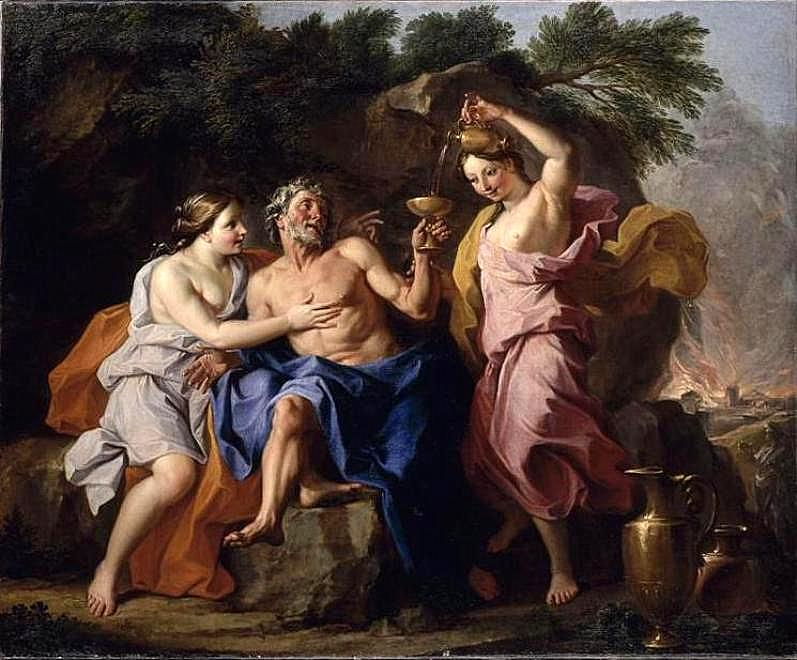

==== Variations by the same artist: Orazio Gentileschi ====
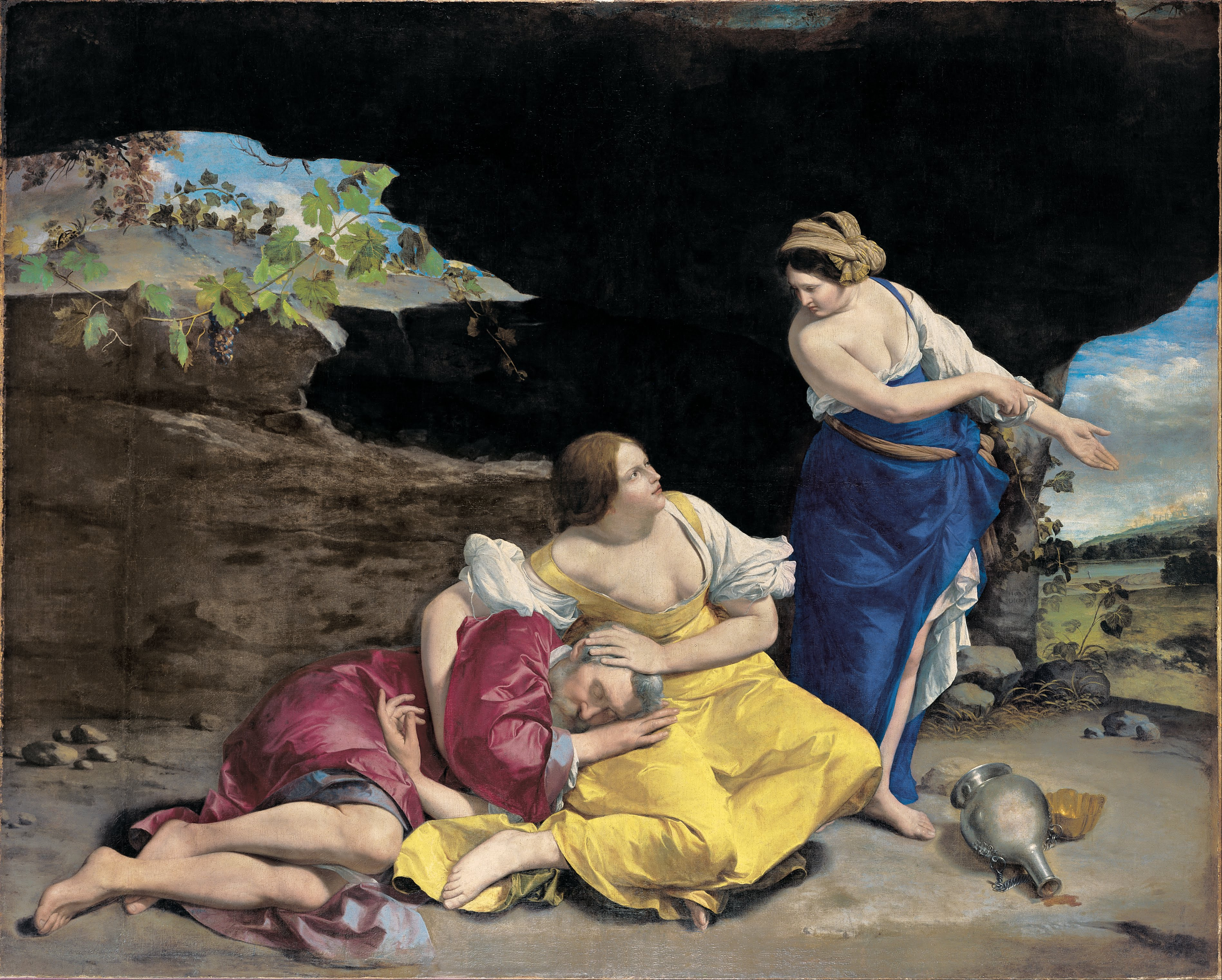
Lot and His Daughters (Orazio Gentileschi, Bilbao), 1628

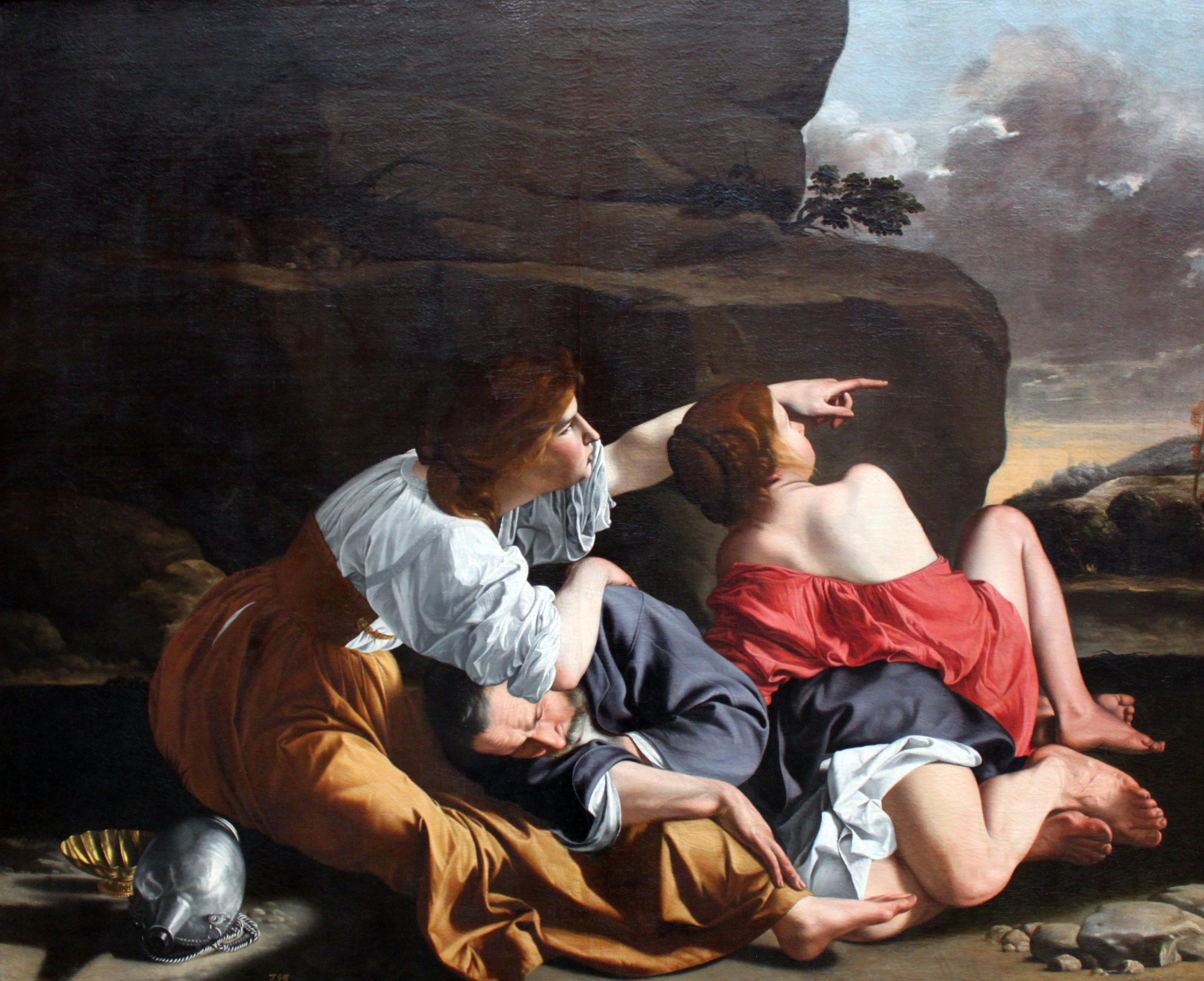
Lot and His Daughters (Orazio Gentileschi, Berlin), 1622

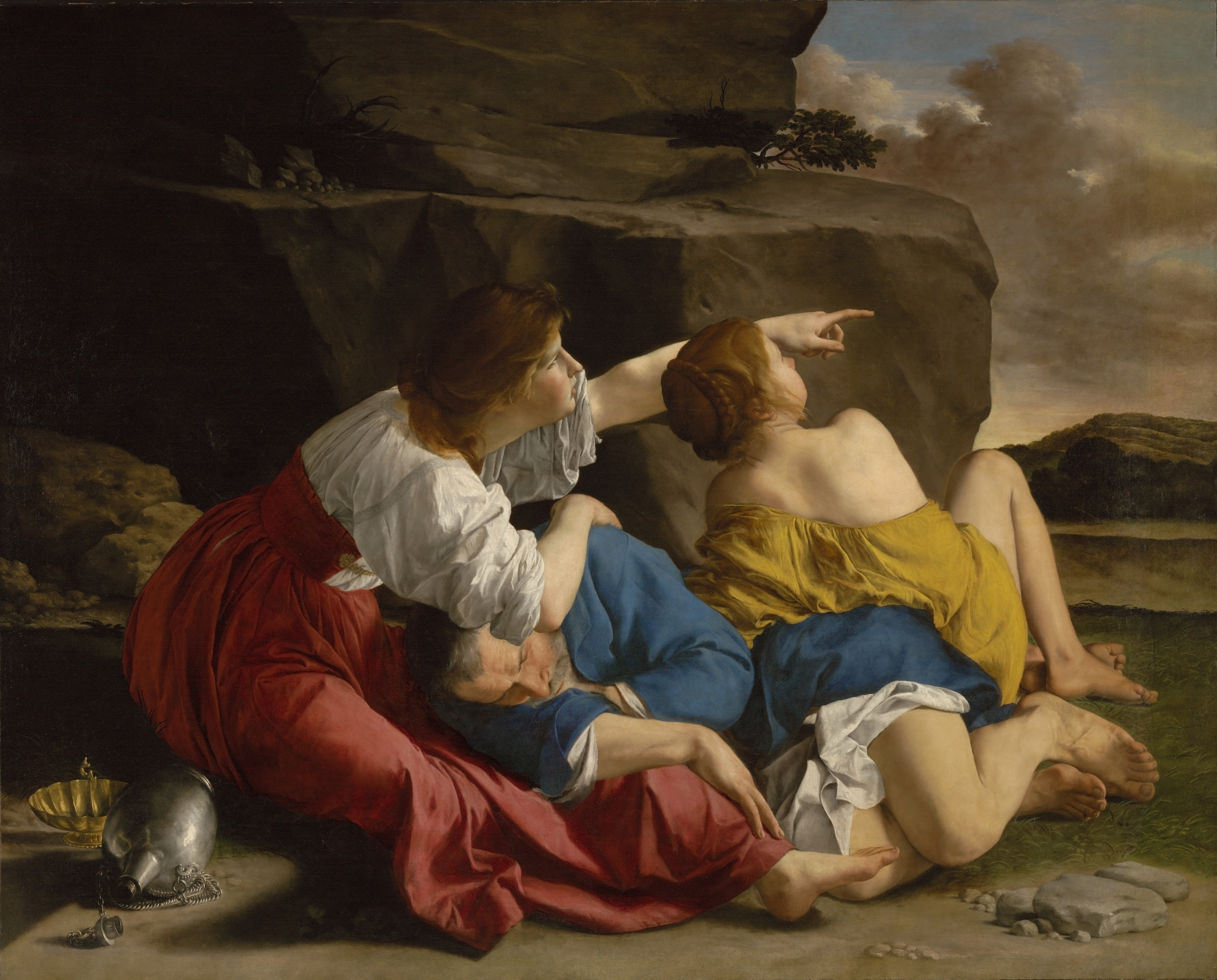
Lot and His Daughters (Orazio Gentileschi, Los Angeles), 1622

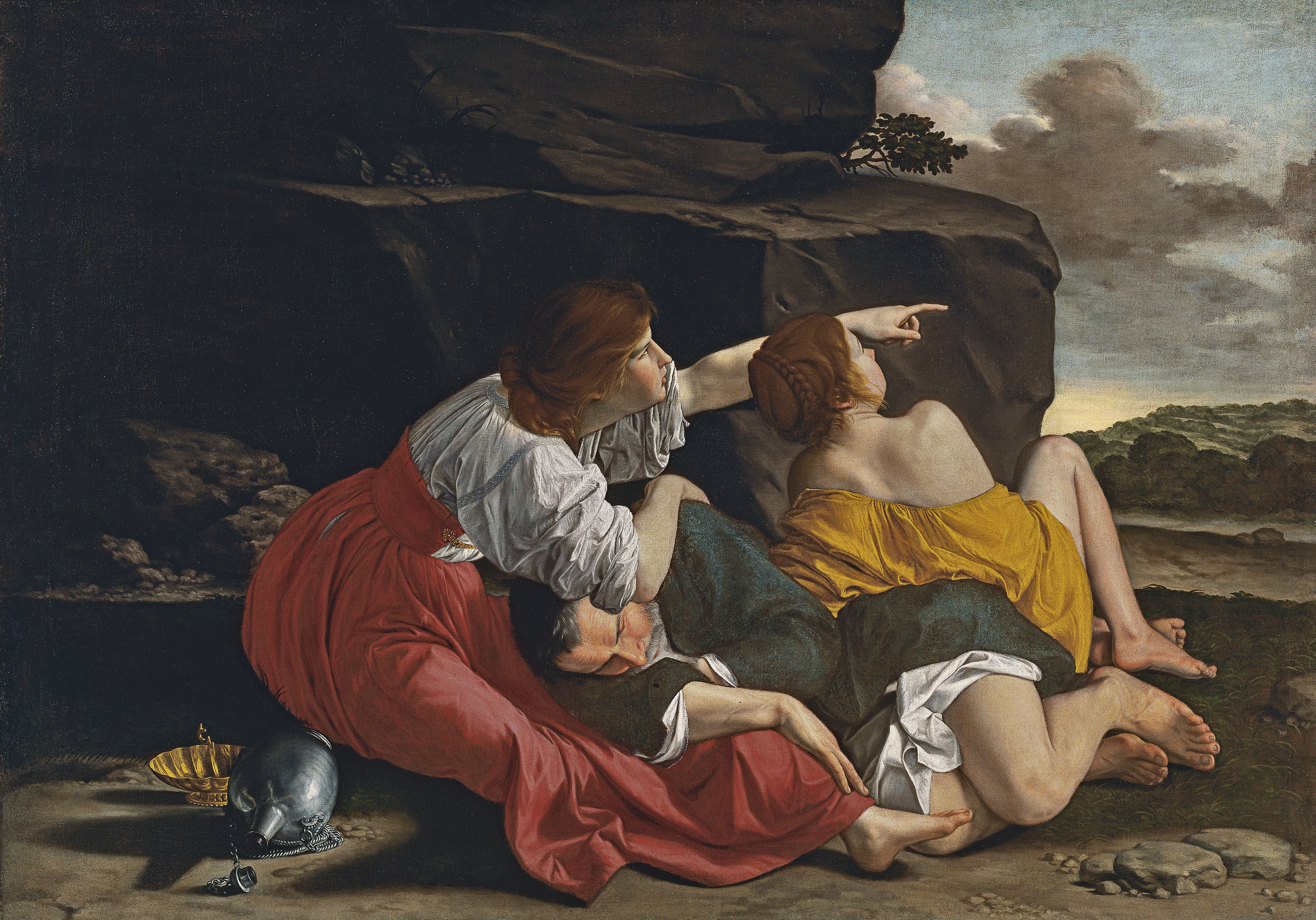
Lot and His Daughters (Orazio Gentileschi, Madrid), 1621-1623

== See also ==
- Monastery of St Lot, Byzantine monastery at what was thought to have been the "cave of Lot"
