= Lot and His Daughters (Orazio Gentileschi, Bilbao) =

1628 painting by Orazio Gentileschi

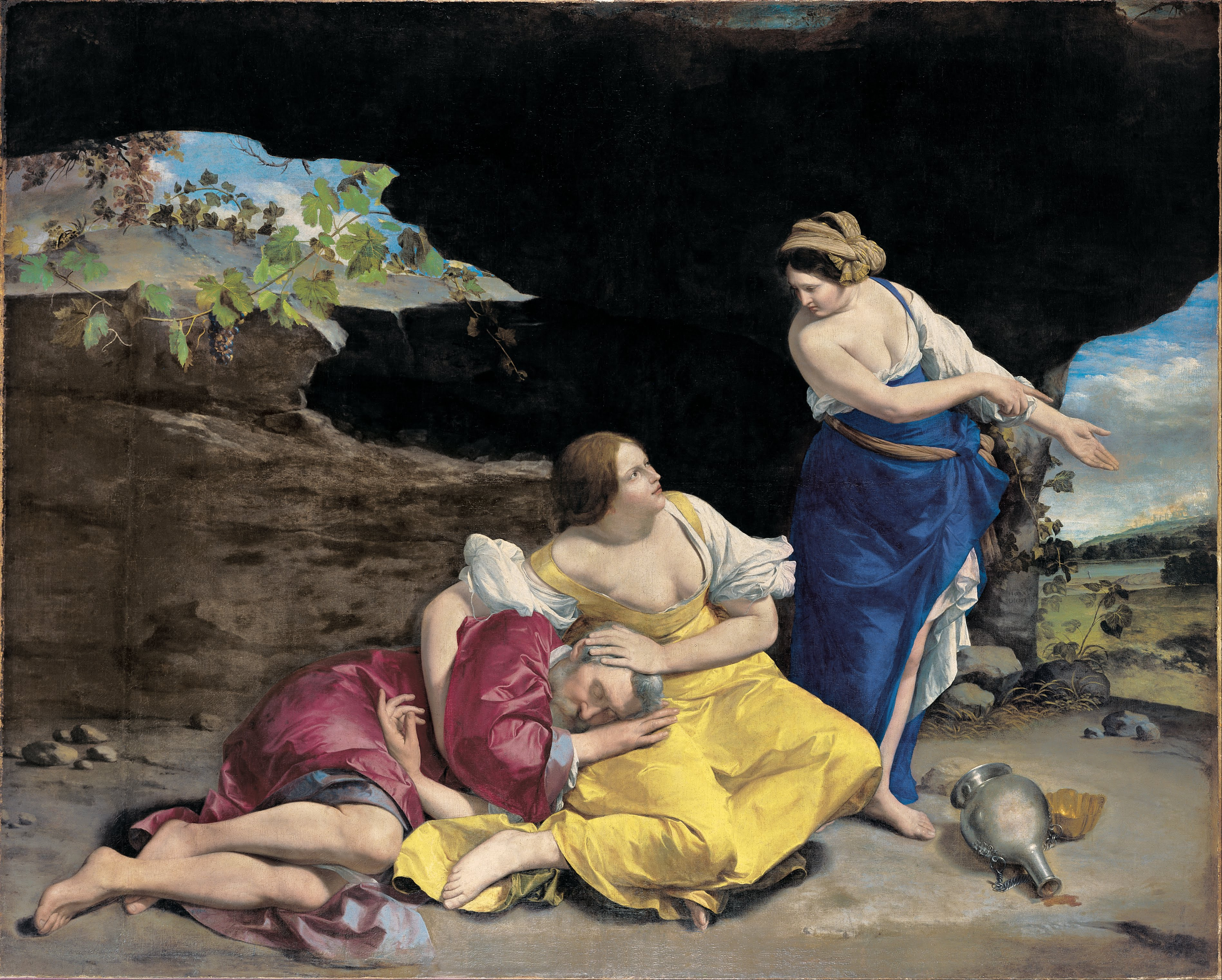
- Artist: Orazio Gentileschi
- Year: c. 1628
- Medium: oil on canvas
- Dimensions: 226 cm × 282 cm (89 in × 111 in)
- Location: Bilbao Fine Arts Museum, Bilbao

Lot and His Daughters is an oil on canvas painting by Italian artist Orazio Gentileschi, created c. 1628, depicting the Biblical episode of Lot and his daughters. It is one of several versions that the painter did of this episode. The painting is of large dimensions and is signed on its central part, on the right side, with the inscription HORA.vs GIENTIL.vs. (on a rock: below a vine and above the bottle, between the daughter in blue and the lake). The current version is held in the Bilbao Fine Arts Museum.

== History ==
In 1626, Gentileschi traveled to England at the request of the Duke of Buckingham, a collector interested in his art and who had previously acquired some of his works. During his stay in England, and at the request of Charles I of England, Gentileschi, produced of several large dimensions paintings inspired by the Bible, including the current.

== Description ==
The canvas narrates the moment when the daughters, after finding shelter in a cave, make their father drunk with the intention of having carnal relations with him. Gentileschi has interpreted the subject by making use of insinuation and suggestion rather than to present the harshness of the facts.

Lot rests drunk in the arms of one of his daughters, while the other, standing up, points with one hand towards the outside of the cave where they have taken refuge; we glimpse the mother turned into a pillar of salt, and in the distance Sodom in flames. In this theatrical way, the young woman argues the reasons for having to sleep with her father. The two women express the sensuality of the imminent sexual encounter by displaying part of their torso, even insinuating the birth of the breasts. A nearby vessel recalls the drunkenness of the patriarch. This effect is accentuated by the nearby vine branch, which circumscribes the group at its top. The artist has chosen bright colors for the daughters' clothing: yellow and ultramarine blue; Lot's dress has been resolved in a crimson hue.

== Seven different versions ==
Gentileschi had already dealt with the same theme before, in 1621, in a very different composition (also titled Lot and His Daughters), of which there are at least four versions: in the Getty Center, in Los Angeles, (considered the first), at the Gemäldegalerie, in Berlin, at the National Gallery of Canada, in Ottawa, and at the Thyssen Bornemisza Museum, in Madrid, a version now considered to have been painted by his assistants.

== See also ==
- List of works by Orazio Gentileschi
