= Lot and His Daughters (anonymous) =

Anonymous painting

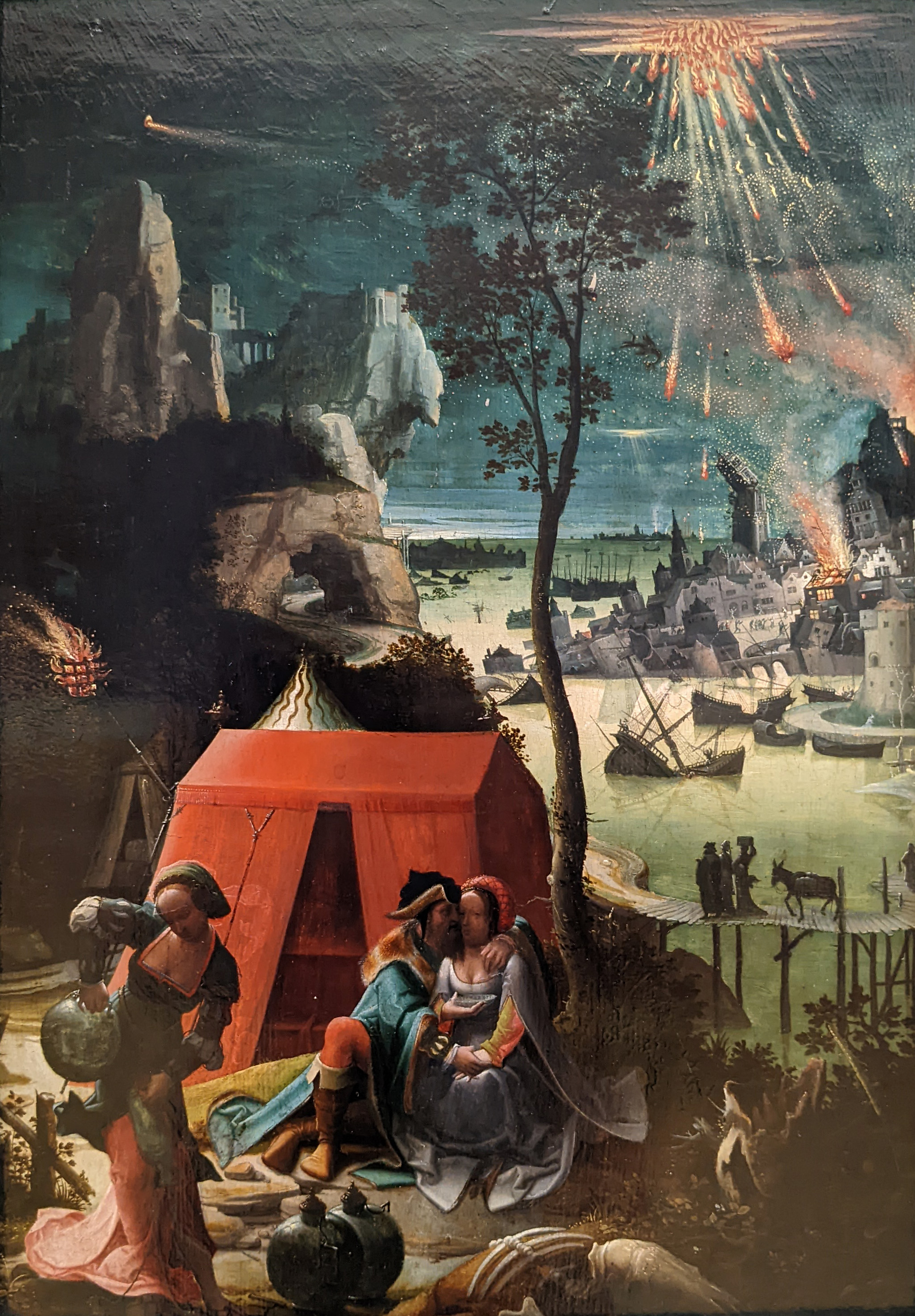

Lot and His Daughters is a c.1520 oil on panel painting. It was produced by an unknown artist working in Leiden or Antwerp, though it was long attributed to Lucas van Leyden. It is now in the Louvre, having entered its collection in 1900. It is the subject of Antonin Artaud's famous essay "Metaphysics and the Mise en Scène."

== Similar works ==
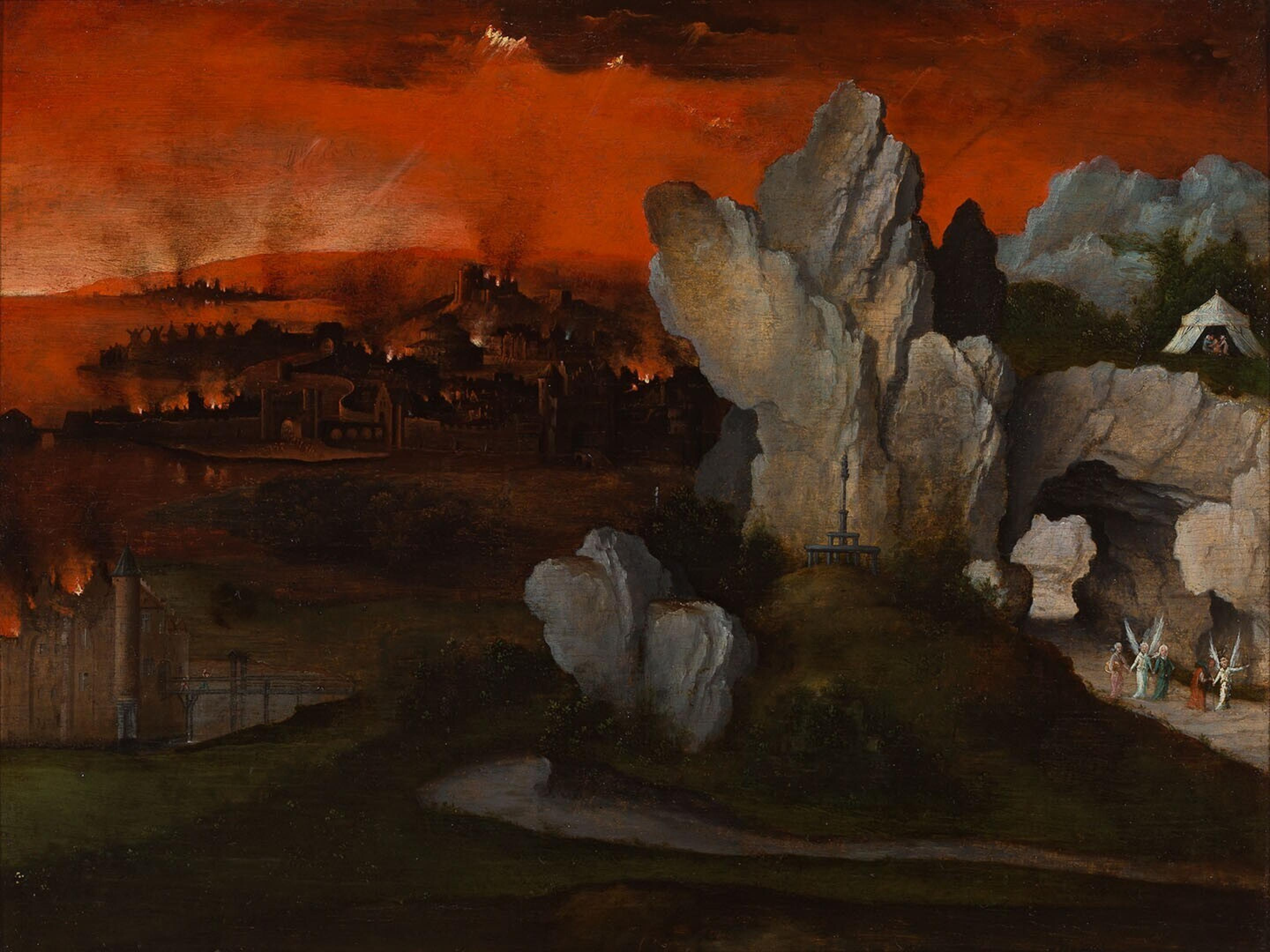
Landscape before the Destruction of Sodom and Gomorrah by Joachim Patinier

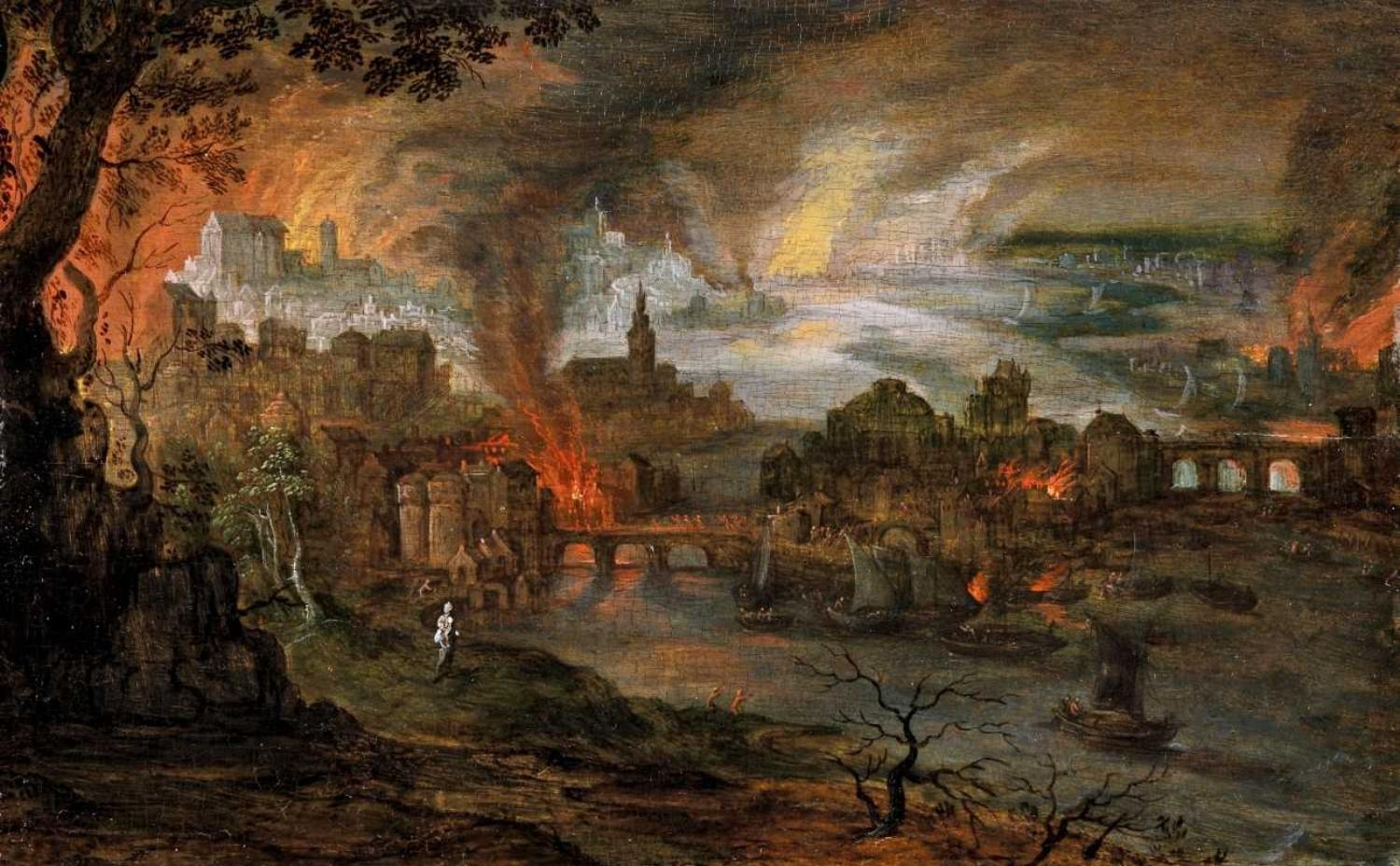
Sodom and Gomorrah by Pieter Schoubroeck
