= Annunciation (Orazio Gentileschi, 1600) =

Painting by Orazio Gentileschi

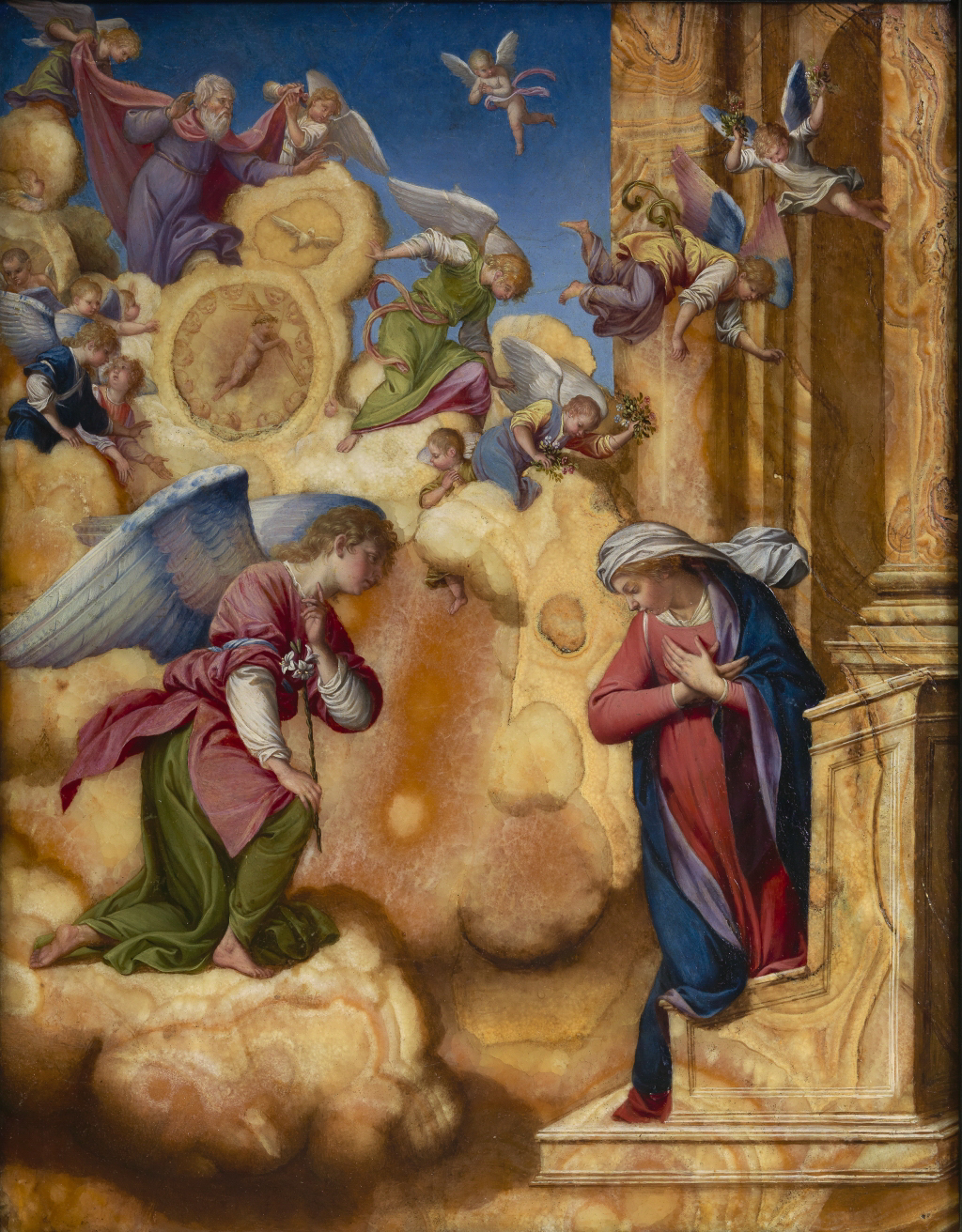
Annunciation (c. 1600-1605) by Orazio Gentileschi

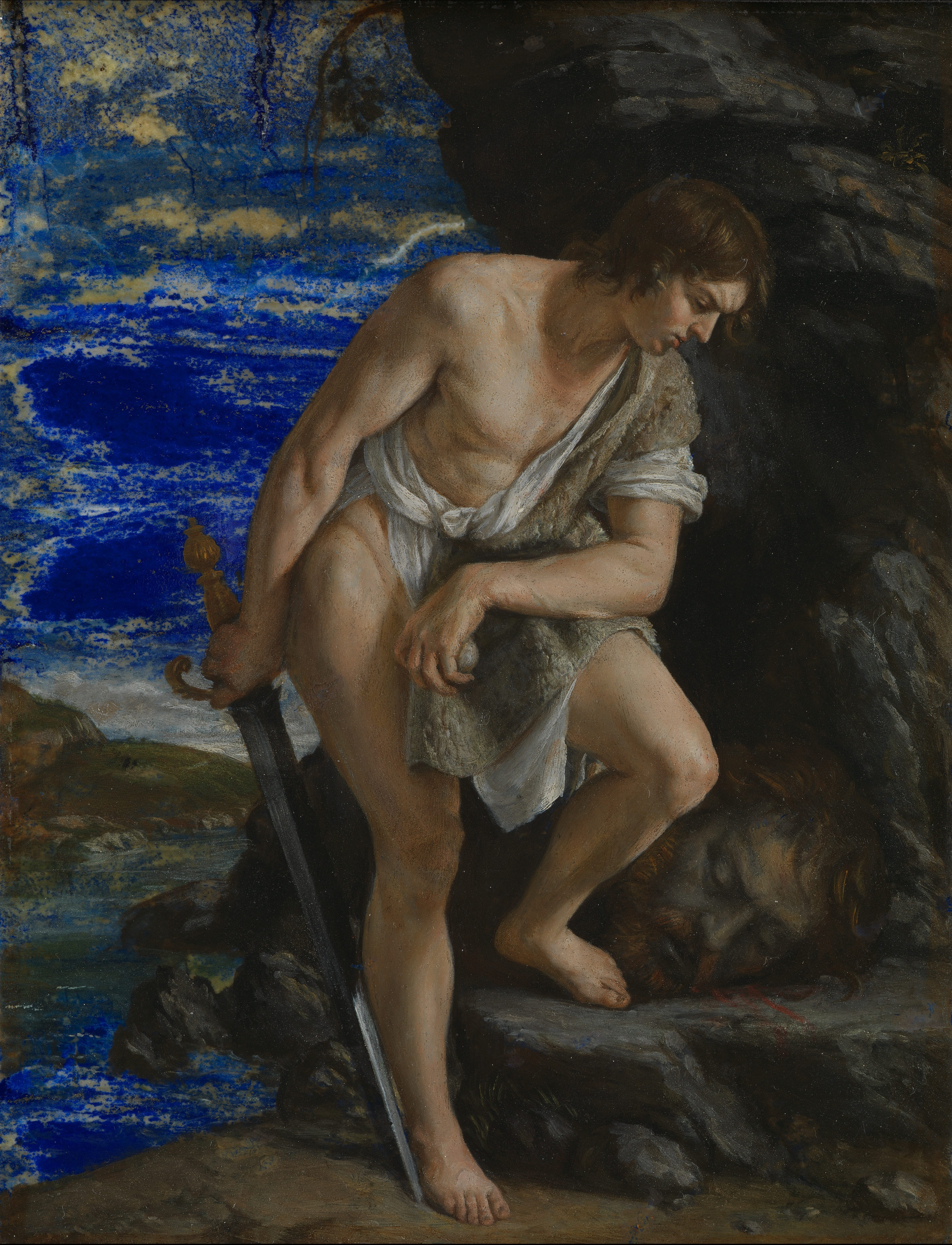
David Contemplating Goliath's Head (c. 1612), Orazio Gentileschi.

Annunciation is an oil on alabaster painting by Orazio Gentileschi, from c. 1600-1605, later mounted on slate. Produced in Rome for an unknown private commissioner, it is now in Álvaro Saieh and Ana Guzmán's residence as part of the Alana collection in Newark, Delaware, USA.

== History ==
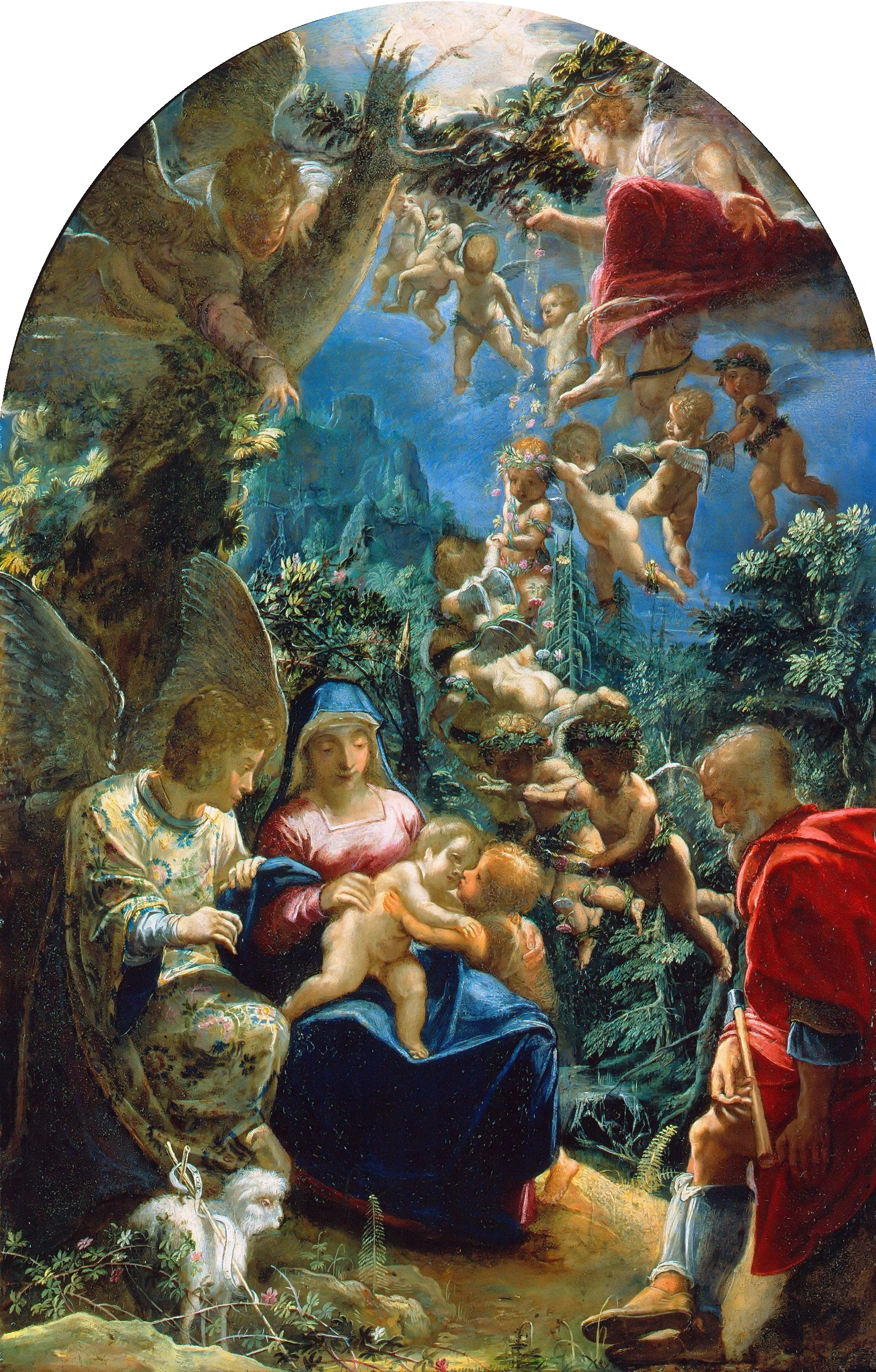
Holy Family with St John the Baptist and Angels (1599), Adam Elsheimer, oil on copper, Gemäldegalerie, Berlin.

At the time of the work its artist was still strongly linked to Caravaggio's style, though in this work he was also influenced by Adam Elsheimer's works in oil on copper. It shows Christ descending from the heavens surrounded by God the Father, the dove of the Holy Spirit and angels carrying the cross and crown of thorns, an iconography of the Annunciation condemned by the Counter-Reformation. The artist uses the natural veins in the stone for the colour and texture of the prie-Dieu, architectural background, clouds and halos around Jesus and the dove. The stone's transparency added a light effect, though this is negated by the later slate mount.

According to Riccardo Lattuada, co-editor of a catalogue raisonné of the works of Orazio and his daughter Artemisia and author of the work's auction notice in 2016, alabaster was frequently used as a support in Florentine School painting in the late 16th and early 17th centuries. The technique was rarely used by Orazio, though he did paint a Madonna Presenting the Christ Child to Saint Francis on marble (which was formerly in the Hessisches Landesmuseum in Darmstadt but was probably destroyed during the Second World War) and a David Contemplating Goliath's Head on lapis lazuli (now in a private collection after only reappearing on the art market in 2012 and going unmentioned in the analysis of paintings of the same title in the 2001 catalogue published by the Metropolitan Museum of Art).

The work was recorded in a Swiss private collection in 1960 before being auctioned at Schuler Auctions in Zurich on 16 March 2016. Its present owners then acquired it on 24 August 2016 and from 2019 to 2020 it was one of 75 works loaned from the Alana Collection to the Musée Jacquemart-André for its exhibition entitled La collection Alana. Chefs-d'œuvre de la peinture italienne. The work was not published before 2019.

== Influences ==
The work's composition has similarities to Gentileschi's mature masterworks Madonna (Darmstadt) and Annunciation, whilst the two figures' poses draw on those in Scipione Pulzone's 1587 painting and Giovanni Jacopo Caraglio's 1565 engraving of the same subject. The faces of the Virgin and the angels also draw on those in Gentileschi's own Assumption of the Virgin (Turin City Museum of Ancient Art), St Francis Supported by an Angel (c. 1607, Boston Museum of Fine Arts) and Baptism of Christ (1607, Santa Maria della Pace, Rome).

Comparisons

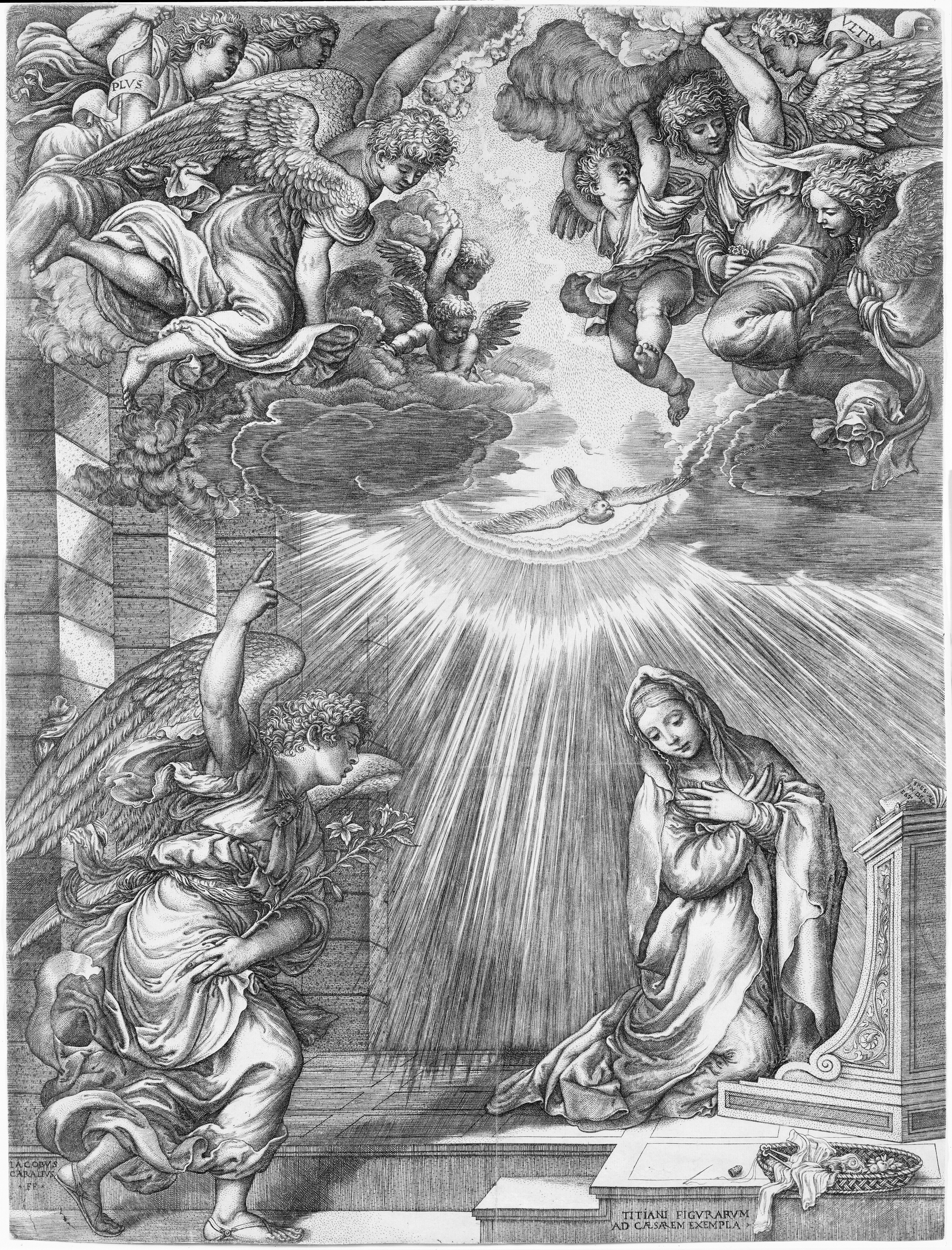
Annunciation (1565), Giovanni Jacopo Caraglio, Metropolitan Museum of Art, New York.

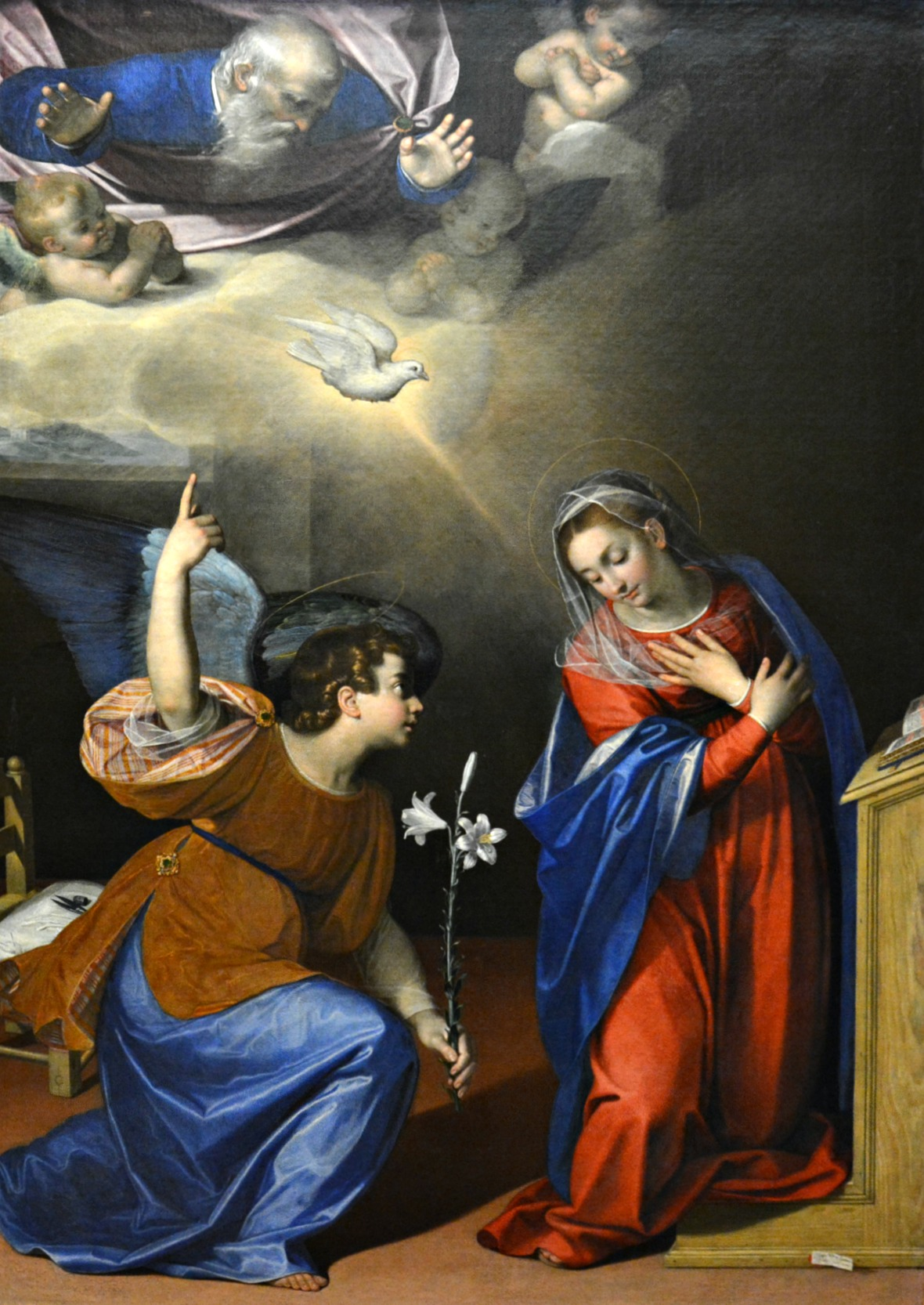
Annunciation (1587), Scipione Pulzone, Capodimonte Museum, Naples - Gentileschi's work draws on the Virgin's pose before her prayer desk

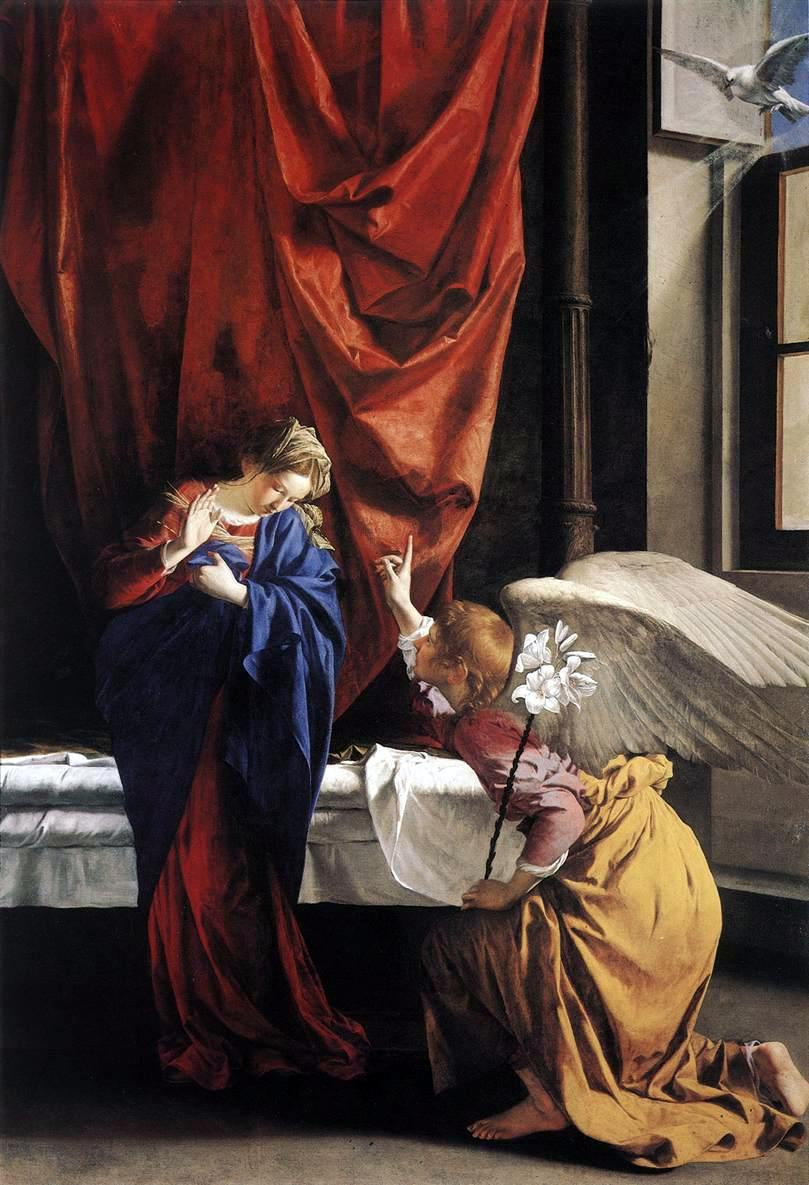
Annunciation (c. 1623), Orazio Gentileschi, Galleria Sabauda, Turin.

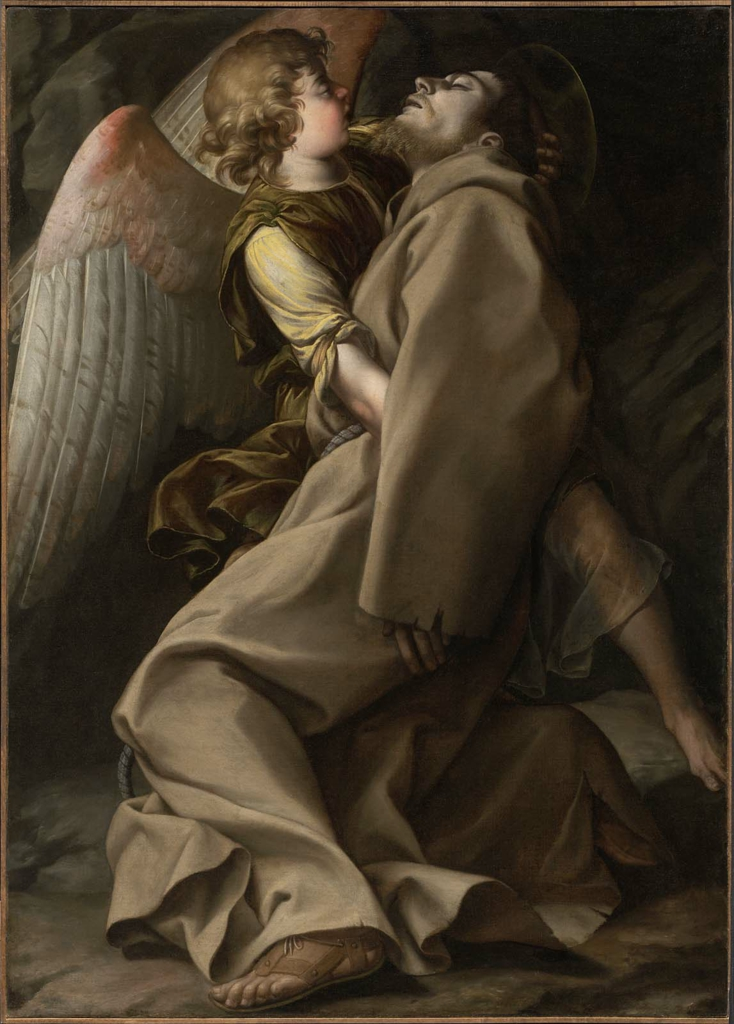
St Francis Supported by an Angel (c. 1607), Orazio Gentileschi, Boston Museum of Fine Arts

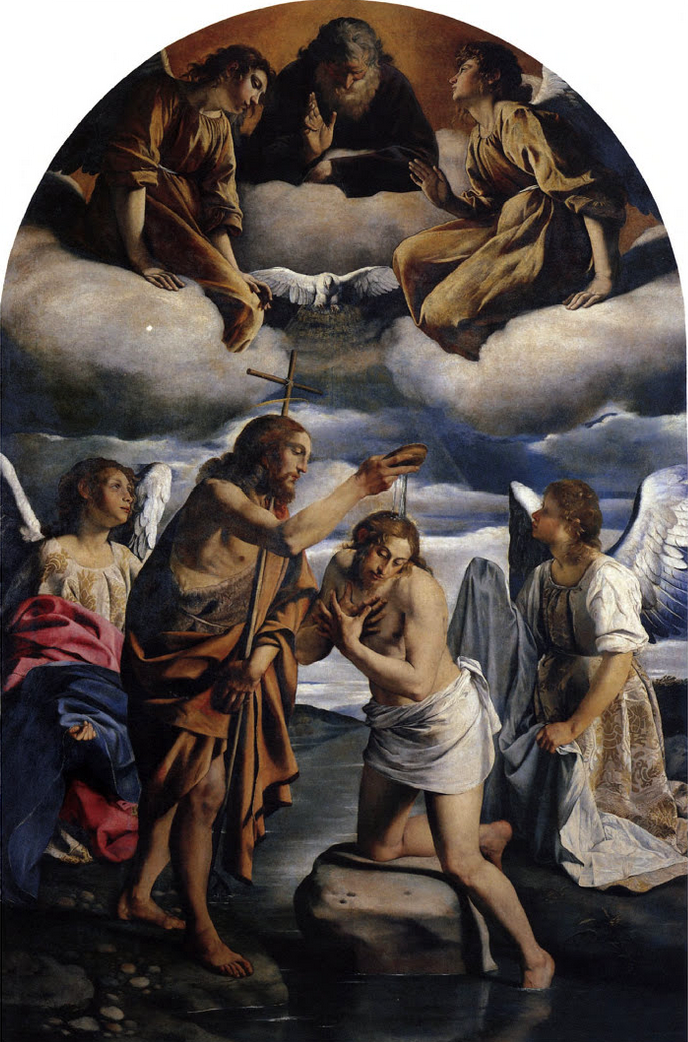
Baptism of Christ (1607), Orazio Gentileschi, Santa Maria della Pace, Rome

== See also ==
- List of works by Orazio Gentileschi
