= Annunciation (Orazio Gentileschi, 1623) =

Painting by Orazio Gentileschi

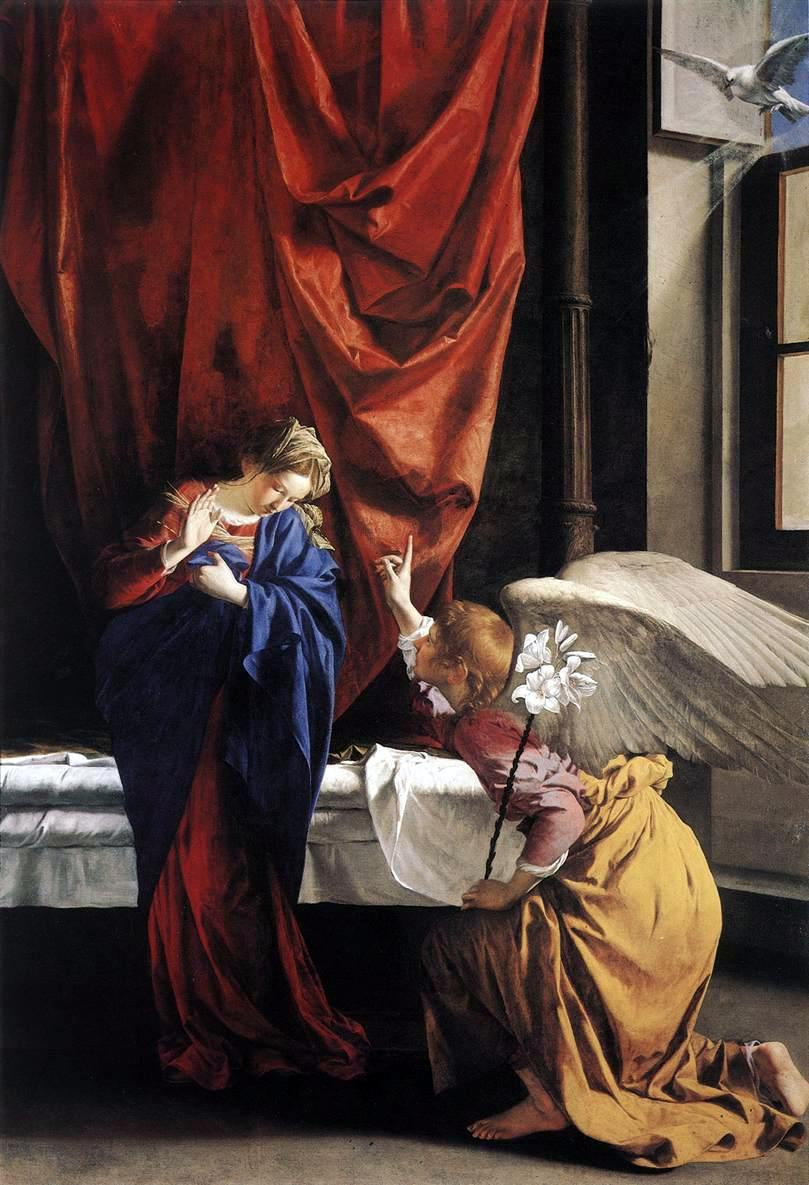
Annunciation (1623) by Orazio Gentileschi

Annunciation is a 1623 oil on canvas painting by Orazio Gentileschi, now in the Galleria Sabauda in Turin. The work was produced during the artist's stay in Genoa. Its large red curtain quotes that in Caravaggio's Death of the Virgin (Louvre), which he had seen in Rome, but the painting as a whole uses a warmer daytime light in contrast to that work's nighttime setting.

The painter sent the work to Charles Emmanuel I, Duke of Savoy in Turin in 1623 with a letter mentioning his other services to the House of Savoy, probably referring to his earlier Assumption of the Virgin (Turin City Museum of Ancient Art), originally intended for the church of Monte dei Cappuccini, Turin. The letter also explicitly mentioned the artist's Lot and His Daughters, long in the Savoy collections.

The accompanying letter and the choice of subject (Savoy had a Supreme Order of the Most Holy Annunciation) show Gentileschi seeking a steady job as a court artist. The Duke accepted the gift but did not give Gentileschi an appointment, forcing him to move on to Paris and then London.

== See also ==
- List of works by Orazio Gentileschi
