= List of works by Orazio Gentileschi =

The following is an incomplete list of paintings by the Italian Baroque artist Orazio Gentileschi. Catalogue numbers abbreviated "MET" are from the 2001 publication by the Metropolitan Museum of Art.

Image	Title	Year	Collection	Measurements	Inventory number	Catalog code
	Madonna and Child with Sts Sebastian and Francis	1600	private collection	78 x 79.5 cm.		MET (1)
	Saint Francis Supported by an Angel	1600	Museum of Fine Arts	139.4 x 101 cm.	2010.374	MET (2)
	Annunciation	1600-1605	Private collection			
	The Stigmatization of Saint Francis	1601	Museum of Fine Arts, Houston	16.5 x 11.6 cm.	BF.2008.11	MET (3)
	Assumption of the Virgin	1605-1608	Turin City Museum of Ancient Art			
	Madonna and Child	1609	Galleria Nazionale d'Arte Antica	131 x 91 cm.	261	MET (4)
	Carrying the Cross	1607	Kunsthistorisches Museum	138.5 x 173 cm.	GG_1553	MET (5)
	Saint Francis supported by an Angel	1607	Museo del Prado	126 x 98 cm.	P03122	MET (6)
	Circumcision	1607	Pinacoteca civica "Francesco Podesti"	390 x 252 cm.		MET (7)
	Madonna and Child	1607	private collection	91.4 x 73 cm.		MET (8)
	Vision of St. Cecilia	1607	Pinacoteca di Brera	350 x 218 cm.	588	MET (9)
	The Holy Family with the Infant Saint John the Baptist	1608	private collection	56.7 x 42.6 cm.		MET (10)
	Baptism of Christ	1607	Santa Maria della Pace	300 x 241 cm.		MET (11)
	David and Goliath	1607	National Gallery of Ireland	185.5 × 136 cm.	NGI.980	MET (12)
	Judith and her maidservant with the head of Holofernes	1608	National Museum of Art, Architecture and Design	136 x 160 cm.	NG.M.02073	MET (13)
	St. Michael and the Devil	1607	private collection	278 x 192 cm.		MET (14)
	Madonna and Child	1609	National Museum of Art of Romania	98.5 x 75 cm.	362/8328	MET (15)
	St. Jerome	1611	Turin City Museum of Ancient Art	153 x 128 cm.	469	MET (16)
	Cleopatra	1613	private collection	118 x 181 cm.		MET (17 (Orazio) & 53 (Artemisia))
	David Contemplating the Head of Goliath	1612	Galleria Spada	173 x 142 cm.	155	MET (18)
	David Contemplating the Head of Goliath	1612	Gemäldegalerie	36.7 × 28.7 cm.	1723	MET (19)
	Executioner with the Head of John the Baptist	1613	Museo del Prado	82 x 61 cm.	P03188	MET (20)
	St Francis and the Angel	1612	Galleria Nazionale d'Arte Antica	133 x 98 cm.	1276	MET (21)
	The Lute Player		National Gallery of Art	143.5 × 129 cm.	1962.8.1	MET (22)
	Christ Crowned with Thorns	1615	Herzog Anton Ulrich Museum	119.5 x 148.5 cm.	GG_805	MET (23)
	St. Mary Magdalene in Penitance	1615	Fabriano Cathedral	220 x 157 cm.		MET (24)
	St. Francis Receiving the Stigmata	1620	San Silvestro in Capite	284 x 173 cm.		MET (25)
	St. Francis Receiving the Stigmata	1620	private collection	77 x 60 cm.		MET (26)
	Landscape with St Christopher	1620	Gemäldegalerie	21 x 28 cm.	1707	MET (27)
	The Virgin with the Sleeping Christ Child	1610	Fogg Museum	85.3 x 99.8 cm.	1976.10	MET (28)
	Crucifixion	1618	Fabriano Cathedral	368 x 210 cm.		MET (29)
	Vision of St Francesca Romana	1620	Galleria Nazionale delle Marche	270 x 157 cm.		MET (30)
	Saint Cecilia with an Angel	1618s	National Gallery of Art	86.4 × 106.7 cm.	1961.9.73	MET (31)
	Saint Cecilia With an Angel Playing the Spinnet	1621	Galleria Nazionale dell'Umbria	90 x 105 cm.		MET (32)
	Portrait of a Young Woman as a Sibyl		Museum of Fine Arts, Houston	81.6 x 73 cm.	61.74	MET (33)
	Rest on the Flight into Egypt	1620	Galleria Nazionale dell'Umbria	175.6 x 218 cm.	1947P5	MET (34)
	The Penitent Magdalene	1622	private collection	149.5 x 183 cm.		MET (35)
	Penitent Magdalene	1622; 1628	Kunsthistorisches Museum	163 × 208 cm.	GG_179	MET (35 (related paintings: Kunsthistorisches Museum))
	Danaë	1623	J. Paul Getty Museum	161.5 × 227.1 cm.	2016.6	MET (36)
	Lot and his Daughters	1622	J. Paul Getty Museum	151.8 × 189.2 cm.	98.PA.10	MET (37)
	Lot and his daughters	1622	Gemäldegalerie	164 x 193 cm.	70.2	MET (Figure 72.)
	Madonna and Child in a Landscape	1622	Burghley House	27.9 × 20.3 cm.		MET (38)
	Madonna and Child in a landscape		Musei di Strada Nuova	30.8 x 23.4 cm.	SR117	MET (38 (related pictures:Palazzo Rosso))
	Judith and Her Maidservant with the Head of Holofernes	1624	Wadsworth Atheneum	134.6 × 157.5 cm.	1949.52	MET (39)
	Young Woman Playing a Violin	1624; 1621	Detroit Institute of Arts	83.19 × 97.79 cm.	68.47	MET (40)
	Danaë	1623	Cleveland Museum of Art	163.5 x 228.5 cm.	1971.101	MET (41)
	Lot and his Daughters	1622	National Gallery of Canada	157.5 × 195.6 cm.	14811	MET (42)
	Annunciation	1623	Sabauda Gallery	286 x 196 cm.		MET (43)
	Public Felicity Triumphant over Dangers	1623s	Department of Paintings of the Louvre	268 x 170 cm.	INV 6809	MET (44)
	Rest on the Flight into Egypt	1622; 1628	Kunsthistorisches Museum	137.2 × 215.9 cm.	GG_180	MET (45)
	Rest on the Flight into Egypt	1628; 1637	Department of Paintings of the Louvre	157 x 225 cm.	INV 340	MET (45 (related paintings: Louvre))
	An Allegory of Peace and the Arts	1639	Royal Collection	892 × 1,070 cm.	RCIN 408464	MET (Figure 85.)
	The Finding of Moses		Museo del Prado	242 x 281 cm.	P00147	MET (Figure 87.)
	Joseph and Potiphar's wife	1632	Royal Collection	204.9 x 261.9 cm.	RCIN 405477	MET (Figure 88.)
	Lot and His Daughters	1628	Bilbao Fine Arts Museum	226 × 282 cm.	69/101	MET (46)
	Diana the Huntress	1625	Museum of Fine Arts of Nantes	215 × 135 cm.	6735; 965.1.1.P	MET (47)
	The Finding of Moses		National Gallery	257 × 301 cm.	L951	MET (48)
	Mocking of Christ	1628	National Gallery of Victoria	124.5 x 159.5 cm.		MET (49)
	Head of a Woman	1636	private collection	42 x 37 cm.		MET (50)
