= Joseph and Potiphar's Wife (Orazio Gentileschi) =

Painting by Orazio Gentileschi

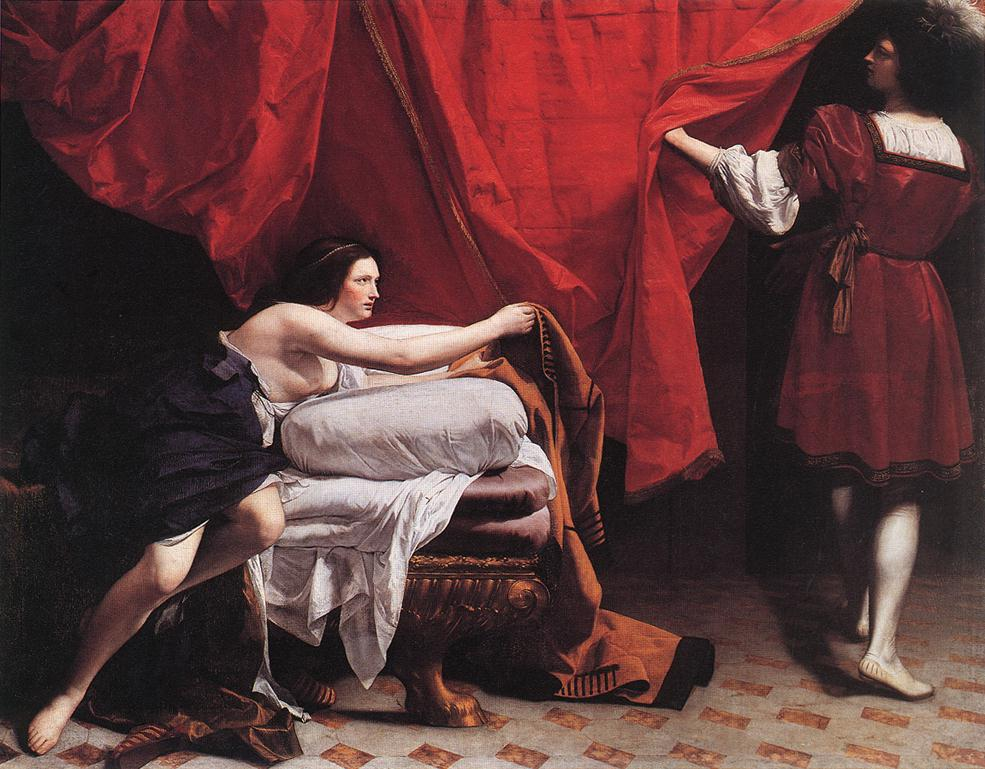
- Artist: Orazio Gentileschi
- Year: c.1630-1632
- Medium: Oil on canvas
- Dimensions: 206.0 cm × 261.9 cm (81.1 in × 103.1 in)
- Location: Royal Collection

Joseph and Potiphar's Wife is a painting by Orazio Gentileschi, painted around 1630-1632 during his time in Charles I's court. Along with The Finding of Moses (National Gallery) and an Apollo and the Muses (Private Collection), it was created for Queen Henrietta to hang in the Queen's House in Greenwich.

Gentileschi received his last payment for the work from the royal family in July 1632 and a frame was made ready for it at Greenwich between 1633 and 1634. It remains in the Royal Collection.

The theme relates to the story told in Book of Genesis chapter 39, of Joseph in Potiphar's house.

== See also ==
- List of works by Orazio Gentileschi

== Bibliography ==
- Christiansen, Keith (2001), Orazio and Artemisia Gentileschi, New York: Metropolitan Museum of Art, ISBN 978-1-58839-006-6
