= The Finding of Moses (Orazio Gentileschi) =

Painting by Orazio Gentileschi

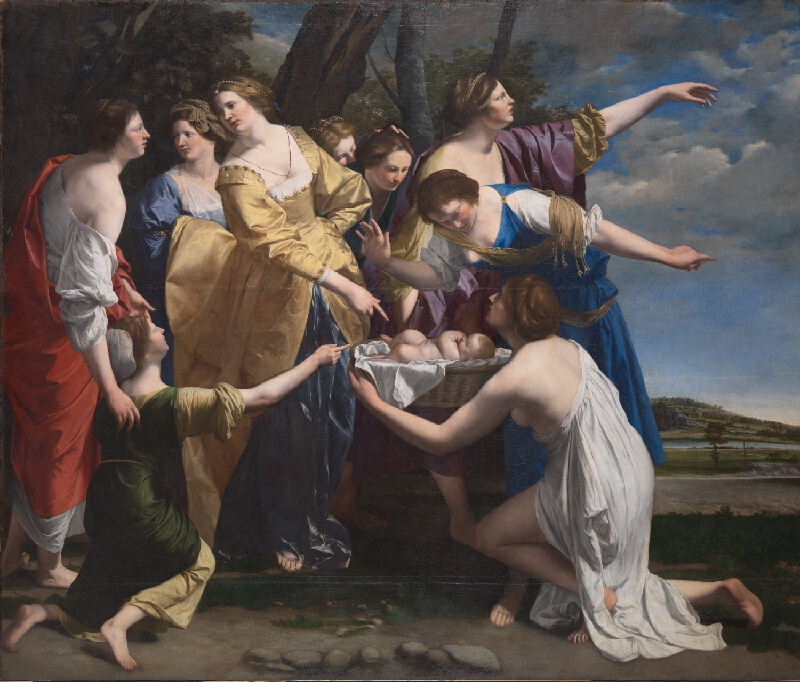
- Artist: Orazio Gentileschi
- Year: early 1630s
- Medium: Oil on canvas
- Dimensions: 257 cm × 301 cm (101 in × 119 in)
- Location: National Gallery, London

The Finding of Moses is an early 1630s painting by Orazio Gentileschi. There are two versions, the prime version is in The National Gallery in London and the second is in Museo del Prado in Madrid.

== London version ==
This version was bought by a private collection in 1995 and went on long-term loan to the National Gallery in 2002. After a loan of nearly 20 years the Gallery succeeded in purchasing the work for £22 Million in December 2019.

Commissioned by Charles I for his wife Henrietta Maria to celebrate the birth of their son and heir Charles II, it was painted for the Queen's House in Greenwich. Upon completion it was hung in the Great Hall, opposite the 1628 version of Lot and His Daughters. After Charles’ execution it was returned to his widow in France in 1660. By the time it entered the Orleans Collection a half-century later, it was regarded as by Velázquez. It then entered the Castle Howard collection, and was only correctly identified after the existence of Gentileschi's second version in the Prado became known in England.

== Madrid version ==
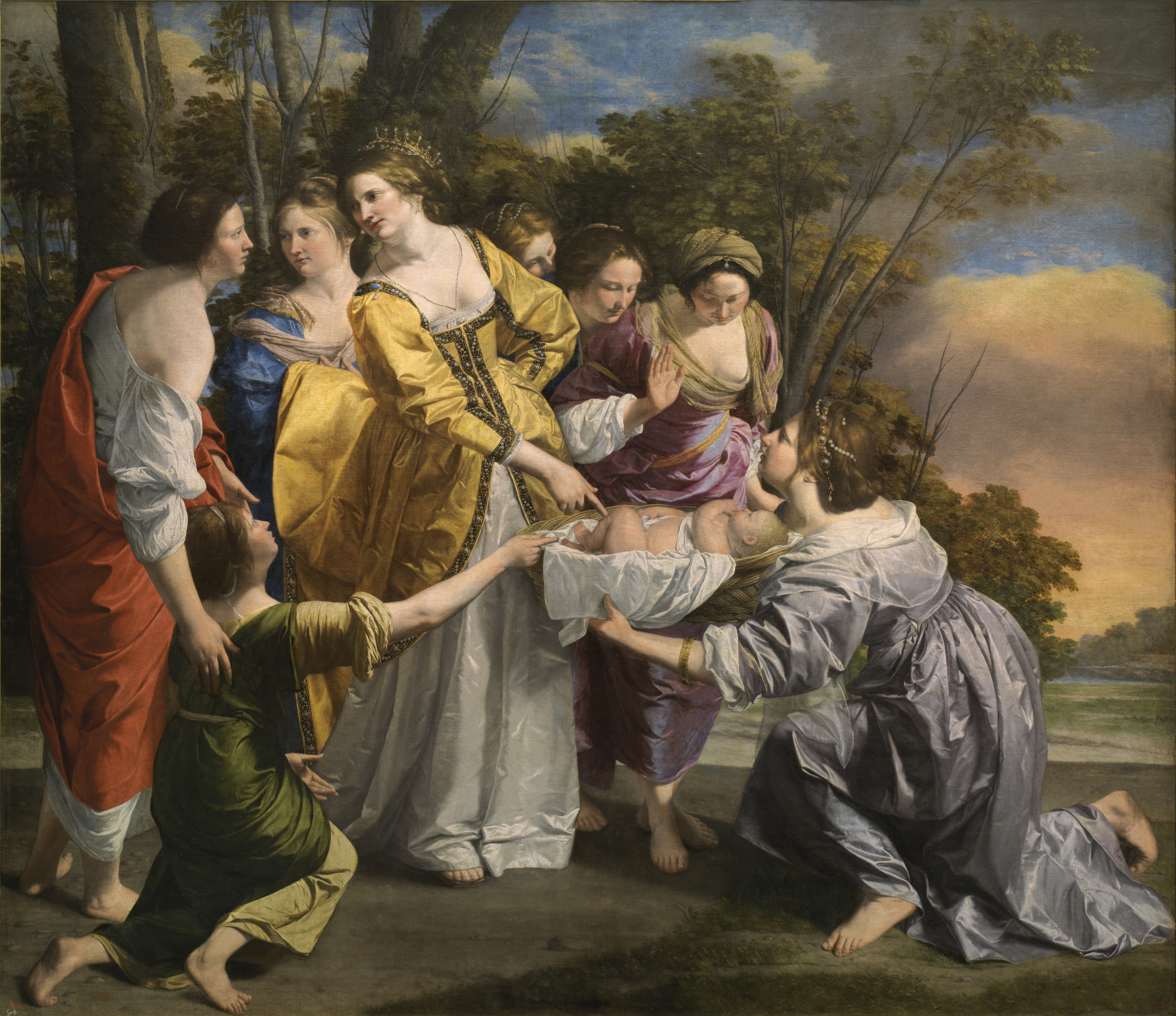
The version of Finding of Moses in Madrid

The version now in the Prado in Madrid was painted in 1633. It is thought to be an autograph copy after his earlier version of the subject in London.

The artist produced it for Philip IV of Spain and sent it to him as a gift in summer 1633. It was delivered personally to Philip in Madrid by the artist's son Francesco. In October that year Arthur Hopton (English ambassador to Spain) wrote that the painting had been hung in the Salón Nuevo in the Royal Alcázar of Madrid.

Pleased with the picture, Philip authorised the payment of 900 ducats to the artist.

The Madrid version is slightly smaller and the nudity has been softened.

== See also ==
- List of works by Orazio Gentileschi

== Bibliography ==
- Orazio and Artemisia Gentileschi (Exhibition catalogue). New York: Metropolitan Museum of Art. 2002.
