= Santa Maria al Monte dei Cappuccini, Turin =

Monte dei Cappuccini
- Church of Santa Maria al Monte and Convent of the Capuchin Friars
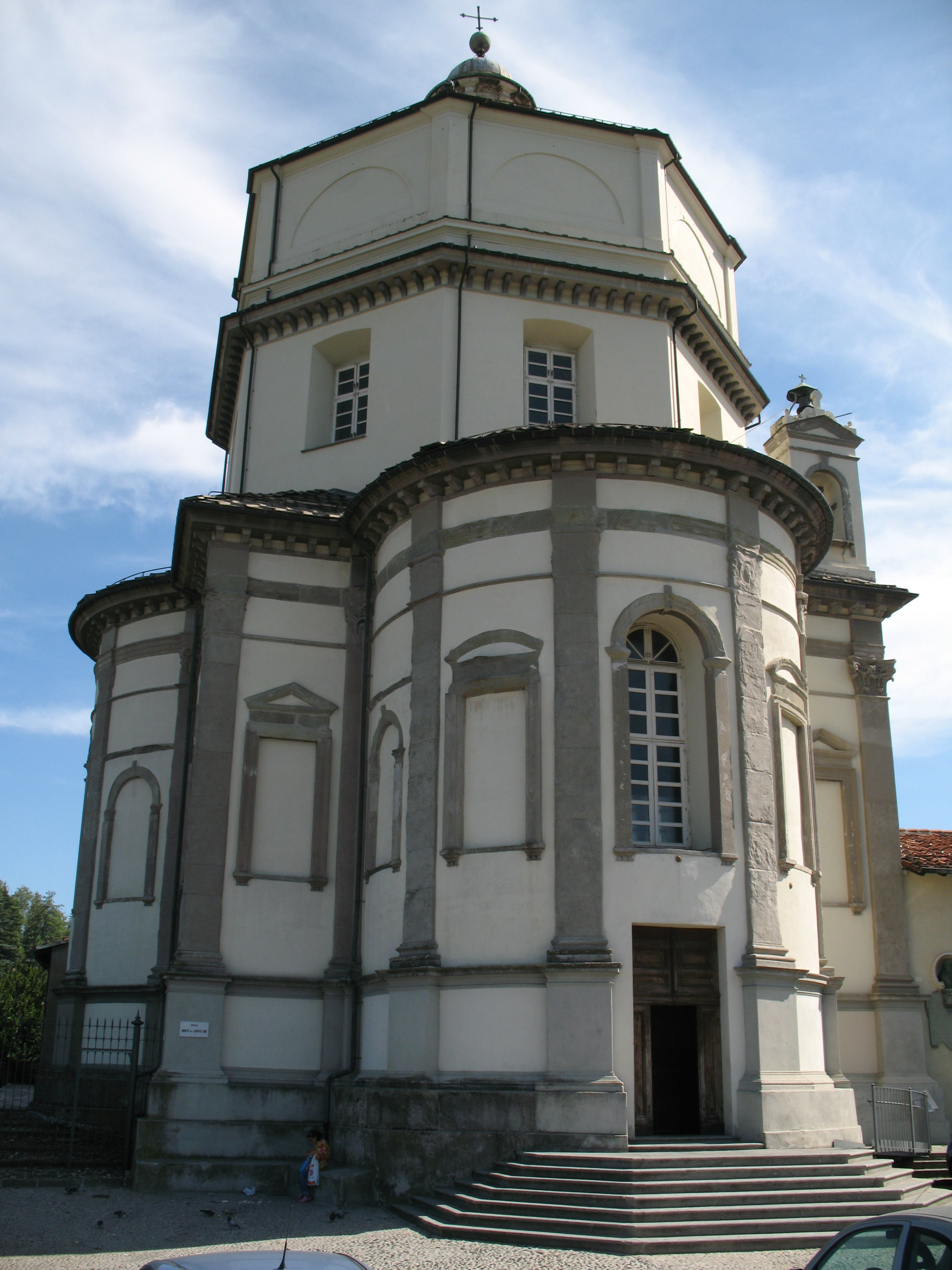
- Façade of the church

- Map of Turin
- 45°03′35″N 7°41′50″E
- Country: Italy
- Denomination: Roman Catholic Church

Architecture
- Architect: Ascanio Vitozzi
- Groundbreaking: 1583
- Completed: 1656

The Church of Santa Maria al Monte dei Cappuccini is a late-Renaissance-style church on a hill overlooking the River Po just south of the bridge of Piazza Vittorio Veneto in Turin, Italy. It was built for the Capuchin Order; construction began in 1583 and was completed in 1656. The original design was by Ascanio Vitozzi, but was completed by Giacomo Soldati.

== Monte di Cappuccini ==
Monte dei Cappuccini is a small hill 325 metres (1,066 ft) a.s.l. in the city of Turin, about 200 metres (660 ft) from the right bank of the river River Po, in the Borgo Po district very close to the historical centre.

This hill had been used since antiquity for defensive purposes as it overlooked one of the established crossing points of the Po. The Romans dedicated a small temple to Jupiter at the summit in the 1st century BC, as evidenced by remains found in the 16th century.

A primitive fortification, comprising a simple tower called Bastita Taurini, was erected in the 11th century. There is also evidence of the 9th-century presence of a small Romanesque church dedicated to the Virgin Mary, called Santa Maria alla Bastita.

From 1204, Monte dei Cappuccini was a fortified garrison occupied by the Templars. Recent excavations have found finds from the period that confirm their presence. Under the Templars, the fortification evolved and expanded.

In 1238, Emperor Frederick II of Swabia gave the fortification to Thomas II of Savoy, who modified it into a proper military bastion. It was reinforced several times due to attempted sieges over the years. It remained in the possession of the House of Savoy until 1473, when it became the private property of a succession of owners.

== The Church and Convent of Santa Maria al Monte ==
As part of his policy of alliances aimed at consolidating his image as defender of the faith, Charles Emmanuel I of Savoy purchased the site in 1581 and donated it to the Order of Friars Minor Capuchin, who were at that time housed in the district of Madonna di Campagna.

Work on the building began in 1583, based on an initial design by Milanese engineer Giacomo Soldati, and was later continued by Ludovico Vanello. Soldati's project was in the Renaissance style, modelled on a classic temple.

As early as 1590, with construction underway, the Capuchin friars were able to move into the monastery, and in 1596 were authorised to officiate at Mass while the church was still under construction.

Two years later, work came to a halt at the level of the cornice, both due to a lack of funds and the arrival of the plague in Turin. Construction was resumed in 1610 under architect and military engineer Ascanio Vitozzi, who completed the design of the church as a Greek cross, freeing up a small area for the current entrance vestibule, plus a choir room behind the high altar. He added an imposing octagonal masonry drum, terminating in a high lead dome, moving away from the Renaissance style and towards a Mannerist design. However, Vitozzi died in 1615, and work had to be continued with the architect Carlo di Castellamonte, who changed some elements to a classic Baroque style. In 1630, a new epidemic of the plague arrived and slowed down the completion of the work. It was restarted and completed by Carlo's son, Amedeo di Castellamonte but the Piedmontese Civil War prevented its consecration. The interior was frescoed by Isidoro Bianchi and a number of valuable paintings were added in the 18th century. Under the altar of a side chapel holds the body of Saint Ignatius of Santhià. The high altar originally bore Orazio Gentileschi's Assumption of the Virgin, now in the Turin City Museum of Ancient Art.

The church was not consecrated until 22 October 1656, on the occasion of a brief visit by Queen Christina of Sweden, who had recently converted to Catholicism and was passing through Turin.

== From the 18th century to the present day ==
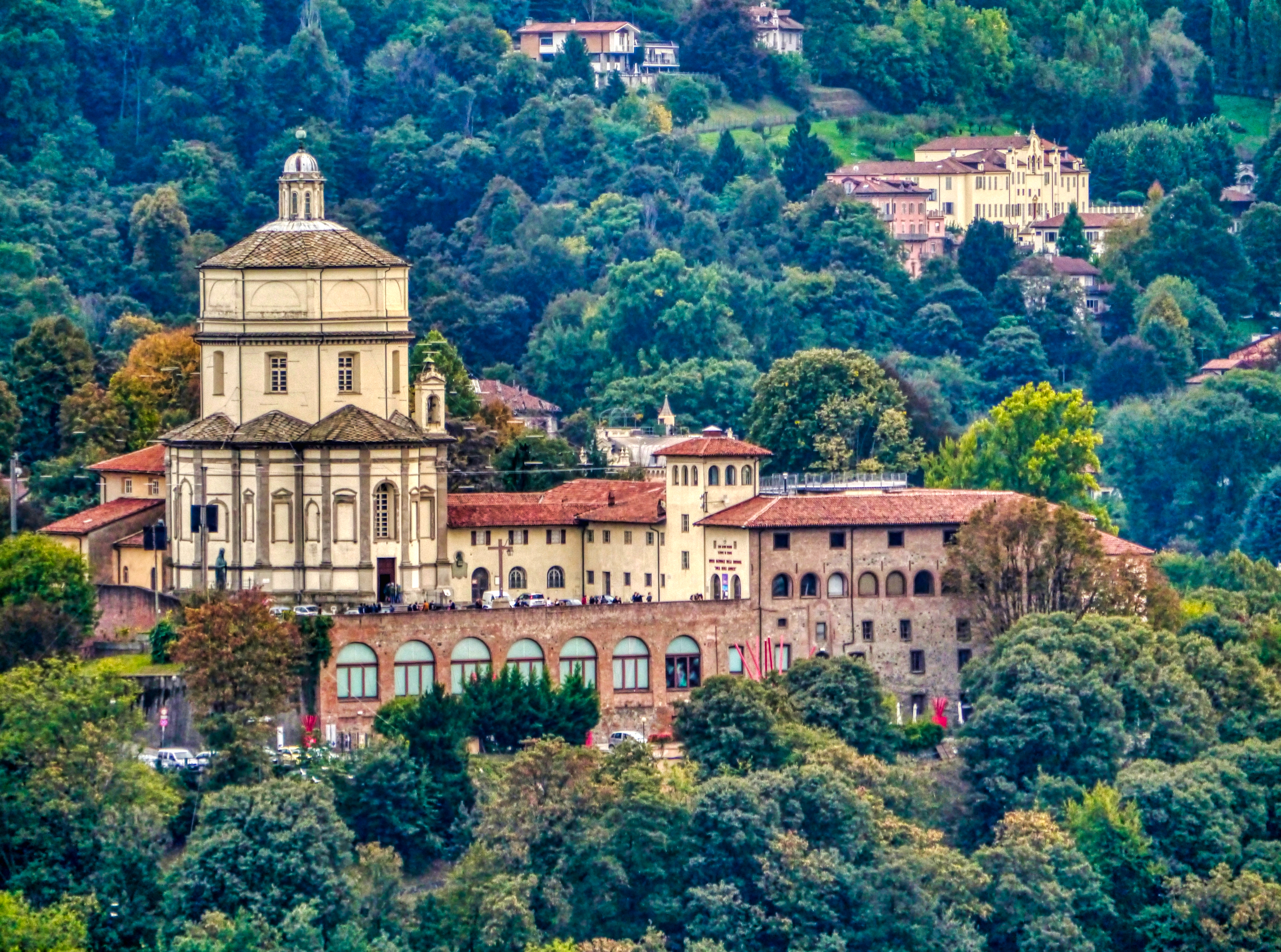
View from Turin's Antonelliana Mole of Santa Maria dei Capuccini

Although it was recognised as a place of fundamental importance for controlling the eastern access to Turin, the French failed to conquer it during the notorious siege of Turin in 1706, but did bombard it.

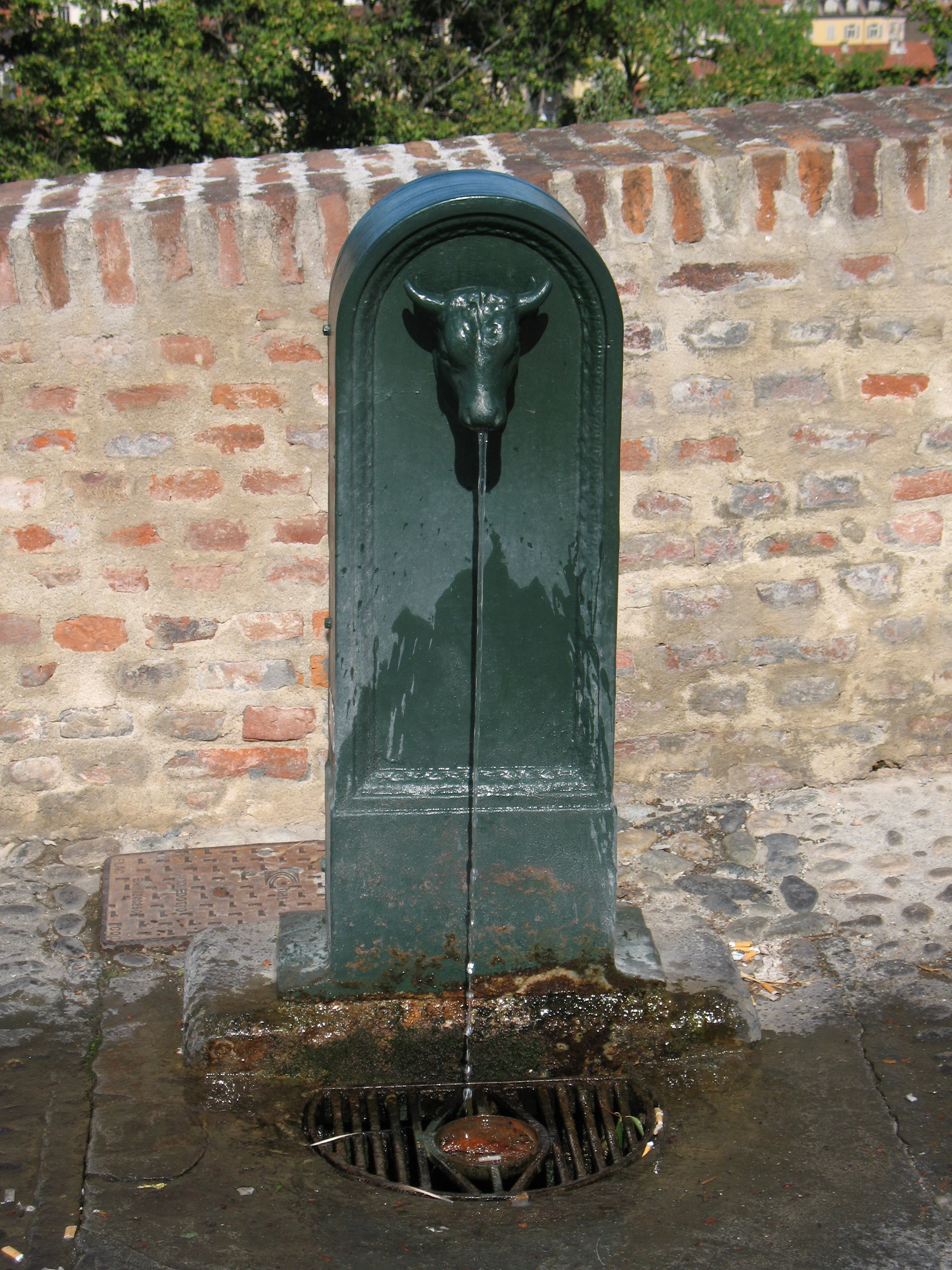
A toret drinking fountain at Monte dei Cappuccini.

Then, in 1799, Monte dei Cappuccini was chosen by the Austro-Russian troops as the location for the artillery that was to bombard Turin if the French, once again occupying the city, offered resistance. The church received only one hit, an event commemorated with a cannonball lodged on the church wall, not far from the one lodged to commemorate that of 1706.

During the Napoleonic occupation and the suppression of monastic orders, the monastery was temporarily designated for private use: the original dome was stripped of its lead and was then replaced in 1814, the year of the return of the Savoy family, with the smaller masonry one with an octagonal lantern. The interior of the dome was decorated by Luigi Vacca.

In 1874 the monastery was re-established on the site. It also became home to a small wooden hut of the Italian Alpine Club and for this reason the permanent headquarters of the “Duca degli Abruzzi” National Mountain Museum was established in the southern wing of the convent complex in 2003.

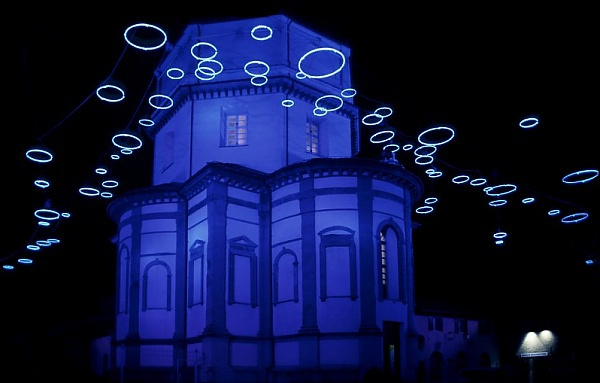
Night view, with winter lighting by German artist Rebecca Horn

Severely damaged by bombing in 1943 during World War II, the building was restored during the post-war years. Further major restorations to the church and convent were carried out in 1962 and 1983. In 1998, circular blue neon lights, called Piccoli spiriti blu (Little Blue Spirits), by Rebecca Horn, were installed to illuminate the top of the hill, especially on Christmas evenings.
