= The Lute Player (Orazio Gentileschi) =

Painting by Orazio Gentileschi

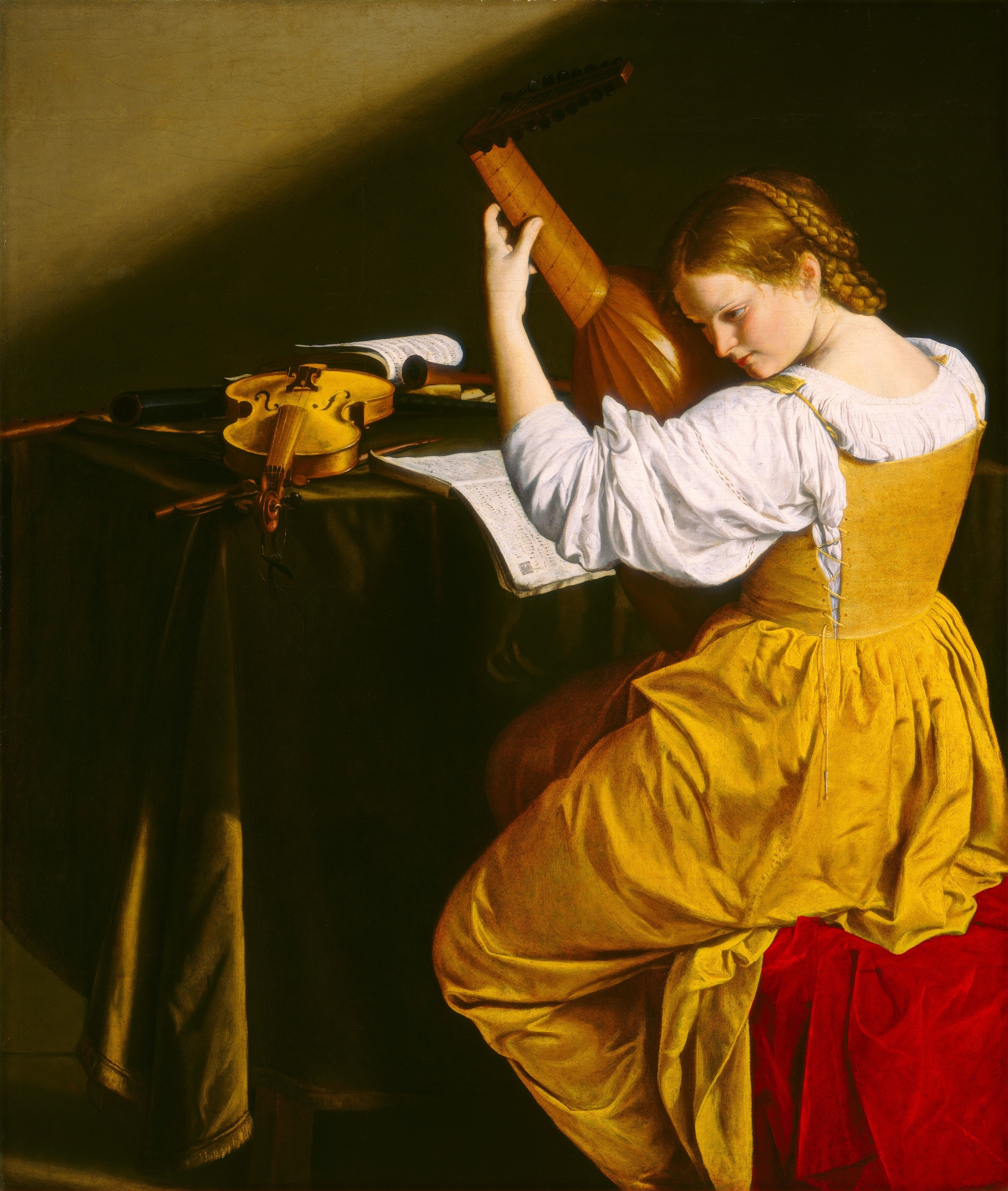
- Artist: Orazio Gentileschi
- Year: c. 1612–1626
- Medium: Oil on canvas
- Dimensions: 143.5 cm × 129 cm (56.5 in × 51 in)
- Location: National Gallery of Art, Washington, D.C.

The Lute Player is a painting from c. 1612–1615 by the Italian artist Orazio Gentileschi (1563–1639) depicting a young woman in a golden dress with a lute.

== Background ==
Gentileschi came into contact with the Italian painter Michelangelo Merisi da Caravaggio (1571–1610) during Gentileschi's early 1600s Rome period. He adopted Caravaggio's method of painting from life using dramatic lighting and is considered one of the leading Caravaggisti. Nevertheless, he developed his own lyrical manner using soft, subdued tones.

== Description ==
The Lute Player depicts a young woman in a golden dress with a lute, turned away from the observer, concentrating her attention on the nineteen stringed instrument and listening intently to a note. She may be tuning her lute in anticipation of a concert, as shown by the assortment of recorders, a cornetto and violin, and the song books lying open on the table before her. However, she cannot reach the black tuning pegs at the top of the instrument in this position. The painting is rich in its renderings of fabrics. It can be taken as a genre scene or as a portrait, but since many of the paintings of its time included some allegorical message, it can also represent the allegory of hearing or a portrayal of Harmonia, the Greek goddess of harmony and concord.

The painting also features an optical illusion. Viewers will notice that the neck of the violin on the table will always appear to point at them no matter where they stand in relation to the painting.

== Influences ==
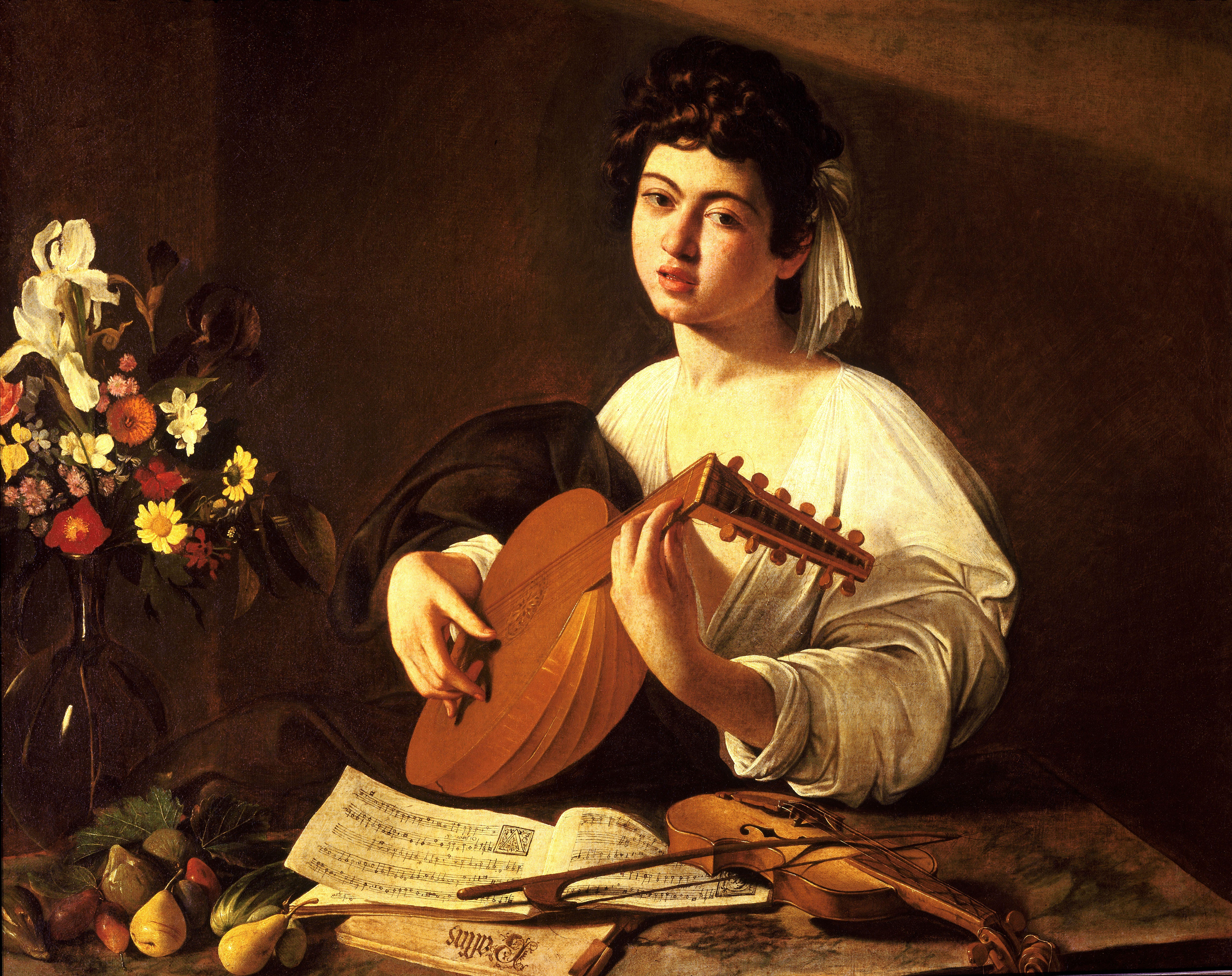
Caravaggio, The Lute Player, c. 1600, Hermitage Museum

The Lute Player is influenced by Caravaggio's early genre scenes, especially Caravaggio's own c. 1600 painting of the same name in the Hermitage Museum. In turn, Gentileschi's painting was the inspiration for Giuseppe Crespi's c. 1700–1705 Woman Playing a Lute. Christiansen & Mann note that Gentileschi returned to Caravaggio's early Giorgionesque work, exemplified by paintings such as the c. 1594–1596 Penitent Magdalene, as guidance for his departure from mainstream Caravaggism that The Lute Player represents.

== See also ==
- List of works by Orazio Gentileschi
- High Renaissance

== References and sources ==
Sources

- Christiansen, Keith; Mann, Judith W. (2002). Orazio and Artemisia Gentileschi (Exhibition catalogue). New York: Metropolitan Museum of Art.
