= Francesco Gentileschi =

Italian 17th-century painter

Francesco Lomi Gentileschi (Italian pronunciation: [franˈtʃesko ˈlɔːmi dʒentiˈleski]; before 11 June 1597 in Rome – after 1665 in Angers) was an Italian Baroque painter. Son of Orazio Gentileschi and brother of Artemisia Gentileschi, he was trained at the studio of Genoese painter Domenico Fiasella. He travelled to London with his father, and upon his death in 1639 he went to Portugal with his brother Giulio. Later in his life, he moved to France, where he worked for Louis XIV.

== Sources ==
- Soprani, Raffaello (1768) [1674]. Ratti, Carlo Giuseppe (ed.). Vite de' pittori, scultori, ed architetti genovesi di Raffaello Soprani, Patrizio genovese; In questa seconda edizione rivedute, accresciute ed arricchite di note da Carlo Giuseppe Ratti, Pittore, e socio delle Accademie ligustica, e parmense (in Italian). Vol. I. Genoa: Stamperia Casamara. p. 237.
- Gentiléschi, Francesco entry (in Italian) in the Enciclopedia Treccani
- Bortolotti, Luca (2005). "LOMI, Orazio". Dizionario Biografico degli Italiani (in Italian). Vol. 65. Rome: Treccani.
