= Assumption of the Virgin (Orazio Gentileschi) =

Painting by Orazio Gentileschi

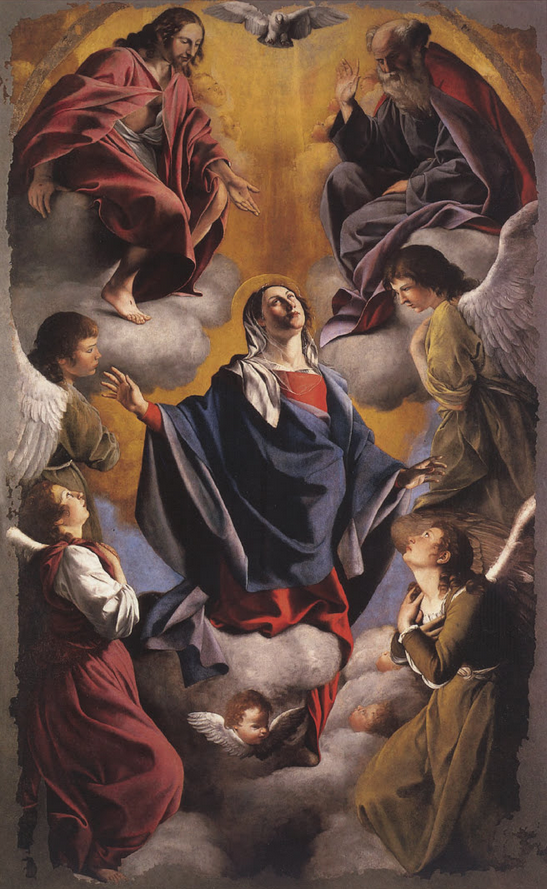
Assumption of the Virgin (1605-1608) by Orazio Gentileschi

Assumption of the Virgin or Our Lady of the Assumption is a 1605-1608 oil on canvas painting by Orazio Gentileschi, now in the Turin City Museum of Ancient Art. It was formerly misattributed to Pier Francesco Mazzucchelli. An early work by Gentileschi, with its use of space and light to model the figures still drawing heavily on Caravaggio, it shows the Assumption of the Virgin surrounded by angels and with the upper register occupied by the three persons of the Holy Trinity.

Since the early years of the 17th century it was used to cover the historic wooden statue of the Madonna on the high altar of Santa Maria al Monte dei Cappuccini in Turin, which had been built by Charles Emmanuel I in 1585–1596. On high holy days the painting would be raised to show the statue.

== See also ==
- List of works by Orazio Gentileschi
