= Orazio Gentileschi =

Italian painter (1563–1639)

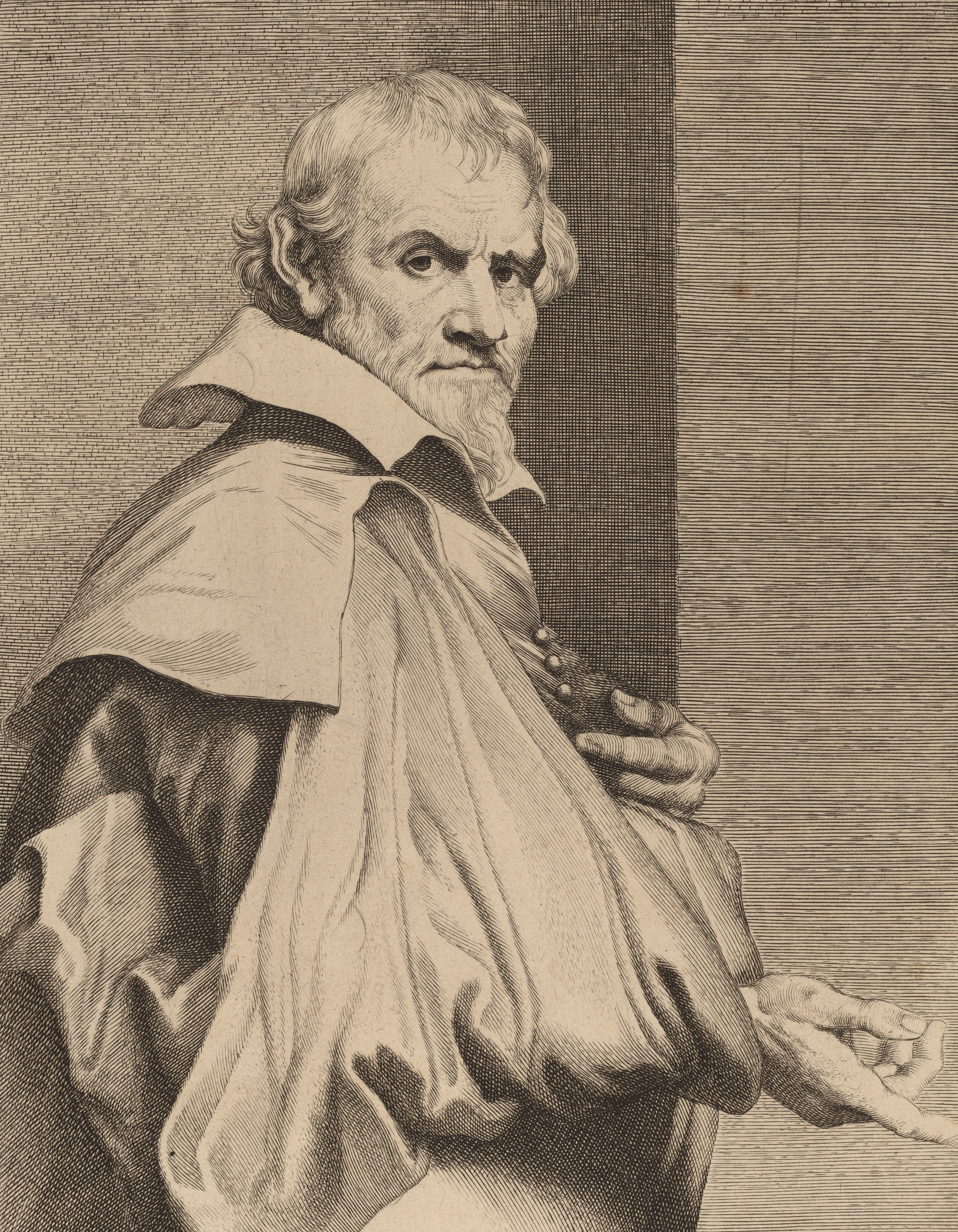
- Portrait of Orazio Gentileschi (c. 1630) by Lucas Emil Vorsterman, for "The Iconography"
- Born: Orazio Lomi; 9 July 1563 (baptized); Pisa, Republic of Florence
- Died: 7 February 1639 (aged 75); London, England
- Known for: Painting
- Movement: Mannerism
- Spouse: Prudenzia di Ottaviano Montoni (died 1605)
- Children: 6, including Artemisia and Francesco
- Relatives: Baccio Lomi (brother); Aurelio Lomi (brother)

Orazio Lomi Gentileschi (Italian pronunciation: [oˈrattsjo ˈlɔːmi dʒentiˈleski]; 1563 – 7 February 1639) was an Italian painter. Born in the Republic of Florence, he began his career in Rome, painting in a Mannerist style, much of his work consisting of painting the figures within the decorative schemes of other artists.

After 1600, he came under the influence of the more naturalistic style of Caravaggio. He received important commissions in Fabriano and Genoa before moving to Paris to the court of Marie de' Medici. He spent the last part of his life at the court of Charles I of England and died in London. He was the father of the painter Artemisia Gentileschi.

== Life ==
Gentileschi was born in the Republic of Florence, the son of a Florentine goldsmith called Giovanni Battista Lomi, and baptised at Pisa on 9 July 1563. He later took the name Gentileschi from an uncle with whom he lived after moving to Rome in either 1576 or 1578. His two older brothers Baccio and Aurelio Lomi were also painters.

=== Early years in Rome ===
Much of Gentileschi's early work in Rome was collaborative in nature. He painted the figures for Agostino Tassi's landscapes in the Palazzo Rospigliosi, and possibly in the great hall of the Quirinal Palace, although some authorities ascribe the figures there to Giovanni Lanfranco. He also worked in the churches of Santa Maria Maggiore, San Nicola in Carcere, Santa Maria della Pace, and San Giovanni in Laterano.

=== Influence of Caravaggio ===
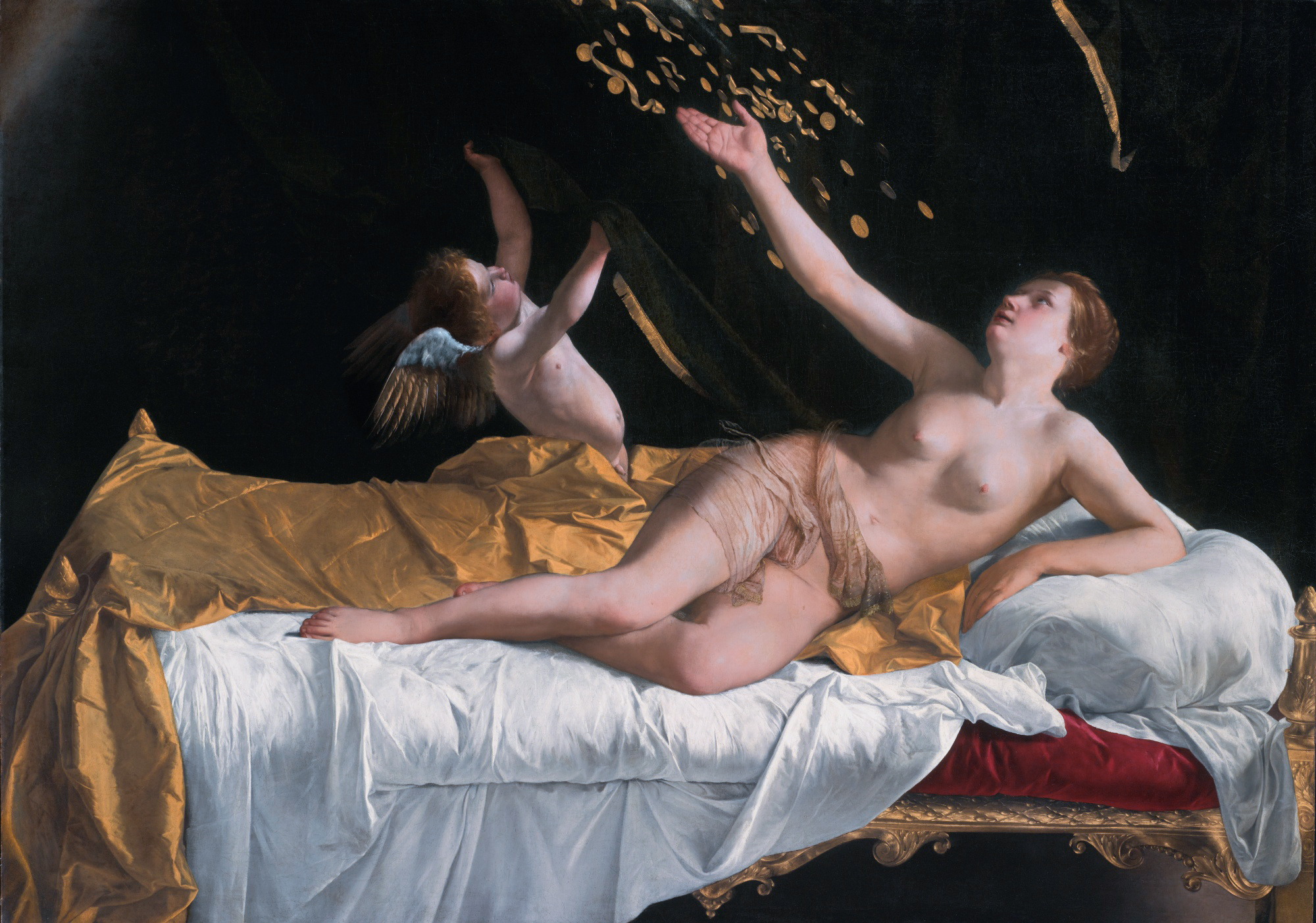
Danaë by Orazio Gentileschi. 1621-1623, Oil on canvas, 161.5 × 227.1 cm (63 9/16 × 89 7/16 in.)

From around 1600, Gentileschi's style was transformed by his contact with Caravaggio—several years his junior—who was then in Rome. In late August 1603, Giovanni Baglione filed a suit for libel against Caravaggio, Gentileschi, Ottavio Leoni, and Filipo Trisegni in connection with some unflattering poems circulated amongst the artistic community of Rome over the preceding summer. Caravaggio's testimony during the trial as recorded in court documents is one of the few insights into his thoughts about the subject of art and his contemporaries. After Caravaggio's flight from Rome, Gentileschi developed a more personal Tuscan lyricism, characterized by lighter colours and precision in detail, reminiscent of his Mannerist beginnings.

In 1611, Gentileschi collaborated with Tassi again, on works including the decorations of the Casino delle Muse. However, their association ended due to a dispute over money. In 1612 he was again called to the Tribunal of Rome, this time to speak against Tassi, who was charged with the rape of his daughter Artemisia Gentileschi.

Details of Gentileschi's studio practice during this period have been preserved in the records of Tassi's trial. Following Caravaggio's lead, he often painted directly from models. One of the witnesses at the trial, Giovanni Molli, a 73-year-old pilgrim from Palermo, said that he had posed for several pictures around 1610–11, including a full-length St Jerome. Gentileschi also made studies from life for later use: he seems to have based the head of Abraham in the Sacrifice of Isaac, painted in the early 1620s, on studies of Molli's head made more than ten years before.

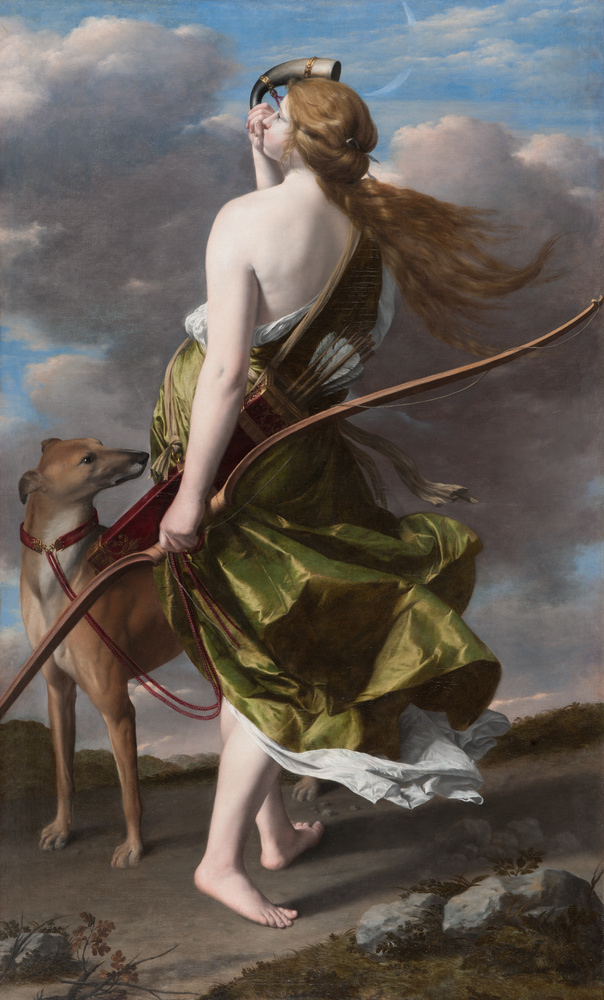
Diana the Huntress by Orazio Gentileschi

Between around 1613 and 1619 he did much of his work for patrons in the Roman Marches, in the cities of Ancona and Fabriano.

=== Genoa ===
In 1621, Gentileschi moved to Genoa, at the invitation of Giovanni Antonio Sauli, who had previously commissioned works from his brother, Aurelio Lomi. Gentileschi's works for Sauli included a Magdalene, a Danäe and Lot and his Daughters. He found other patrons in the city, including Marcantonio Doria, for whom he carried out an elaborate scheme of frescoes of Old Testament subjects in a "casino" (since destroyed) in the grounds of his palace at Sampierdarena.

=== France and England ===
In the summer or autumn of 1624, Gentileschi left Genoa for Paris, and the court of the Queen Mother, Marie de' Medici. He stayed for two years, but only one picture from his time there has been identified, an allegorical figure of Public Felicity, painted for the Palais du Luxembourg, and now in the collection of the Louvre.

In 1626, Gentileschi, accompanied by his three sons, left France for England, where he became part of the household of the King's first minister, George Villiers, 1st Duke of Buckingham. He was to remain in England for the rest of his life. One of his first major works there was a large ceiling painting (since destroyed) of Apollo and the Muses for Buckingham's newly rebuilt London home, York House, in the Strand. He had already received a certain degree of royal patronage by the time of Buckingham's murder in April 1628, and all his commissions after this event came from the royal family.

He was a favourite artist of Queen Henrietta Maria, for whom he carried out the ceiling paintings at Queen's House, Greenwich (later transferred to Marlborough House, London). The paintings of his English period are more elegant, artificial and restrained than his previous works. They include two versions of The Finding of Moses, (1633) one of which was sent to Philip IV of Spain; previously assumed to have been a gift from Charles I, it is now known to have been sent on Gentileschi's own initiative.

In England van Dyck made a drawing of Gentileschi for inclusion in his Iconographia, a series of portraits of the leading artists, statesmen, collectors and scholars of the time, which he intended to publish as a set of engravings.

Gentileschi died in London on 7 February 1639, and was buried in the Queen's Chapel at Somerset House.

== Works ==
Orazio Gentileschi

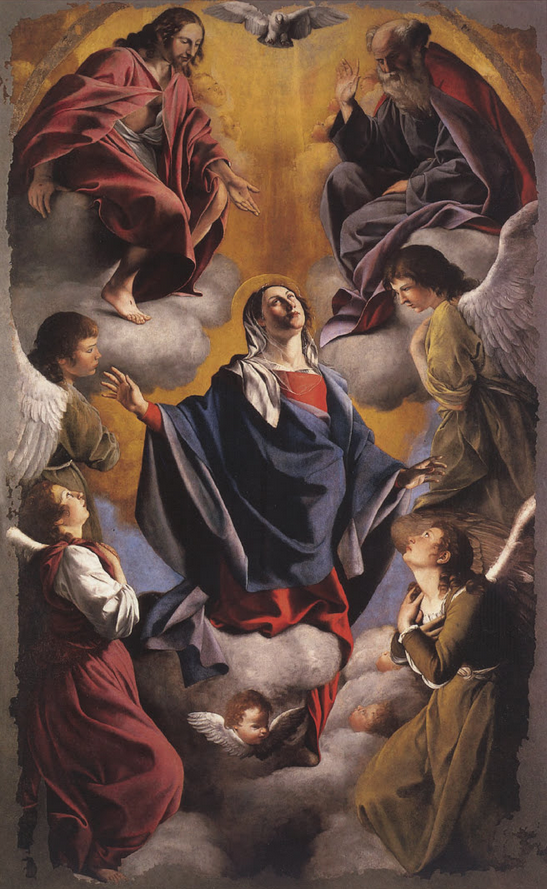
Assumption of the Virgin

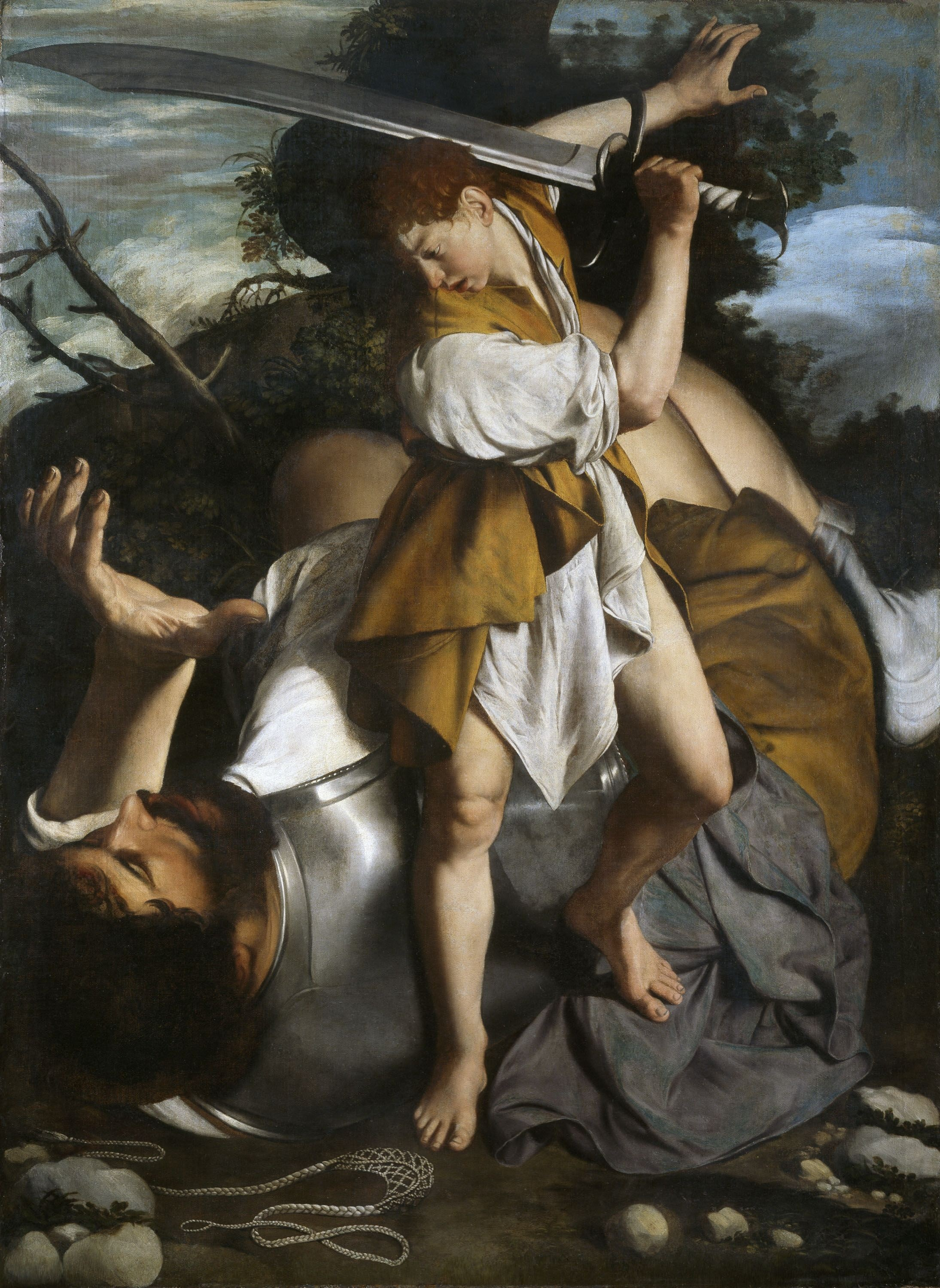
David and Goliath

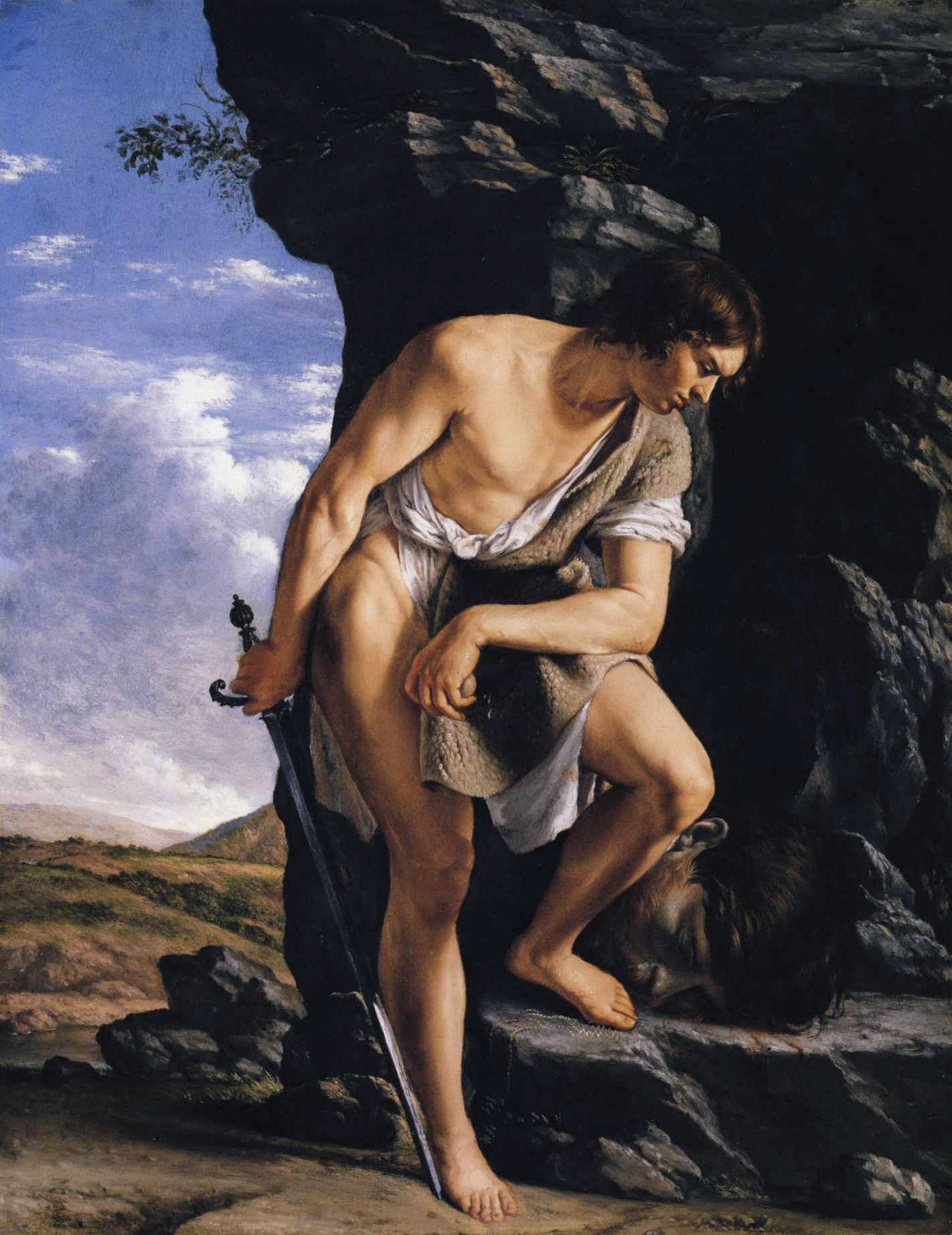
David Contemplating the Head of Goliath

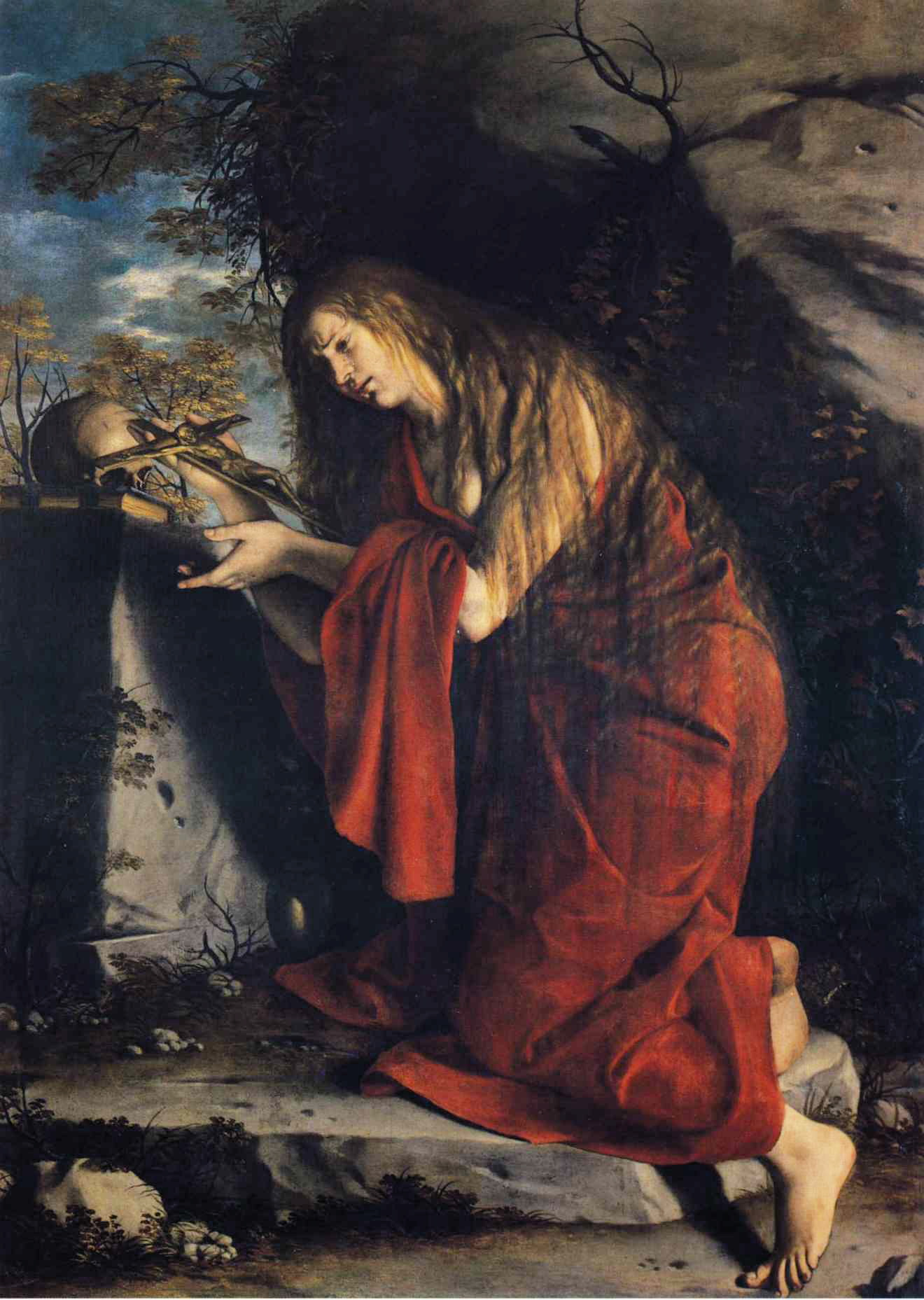
Saint Mary Magdalen in Penitence

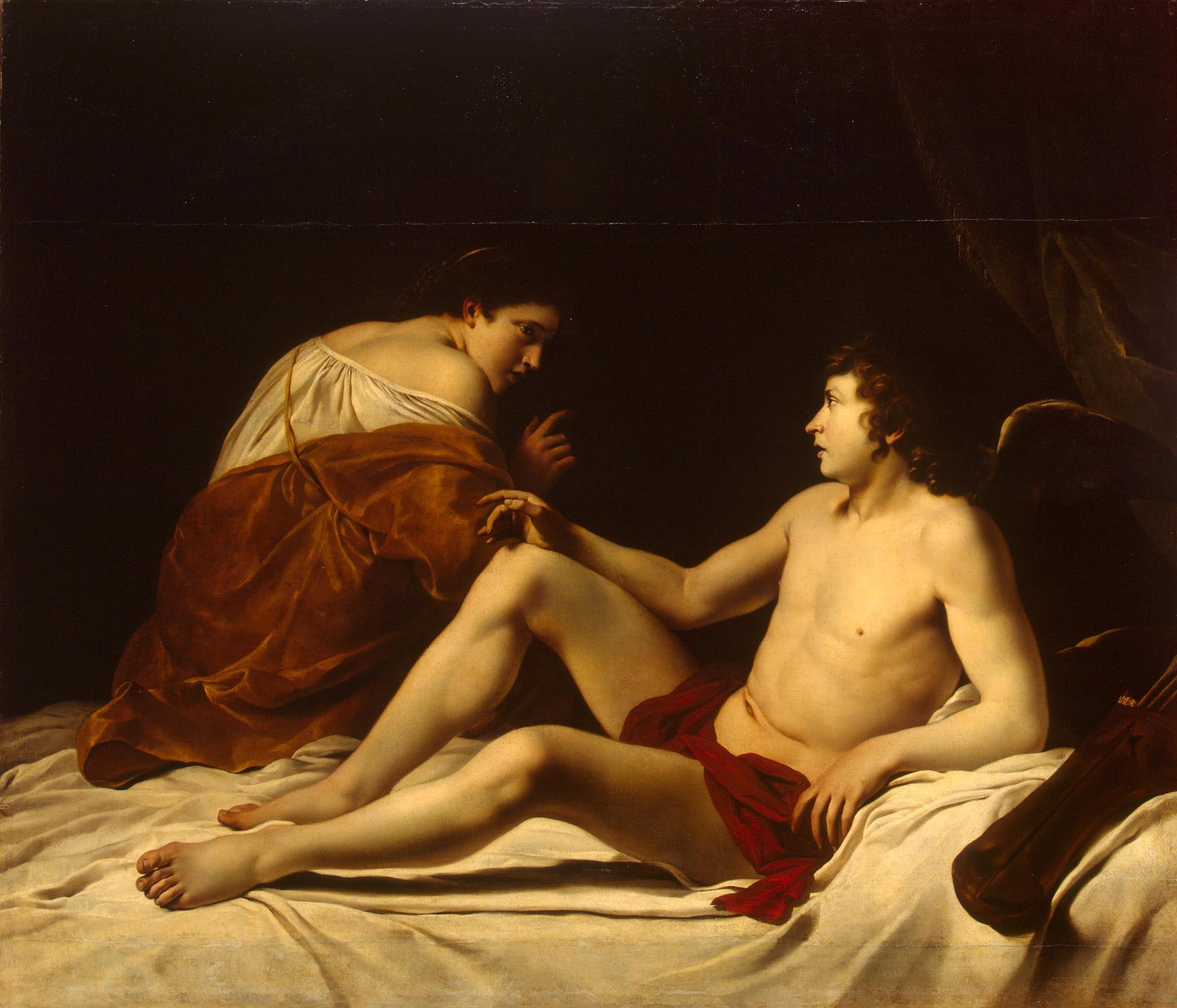
Cupid and Psyche

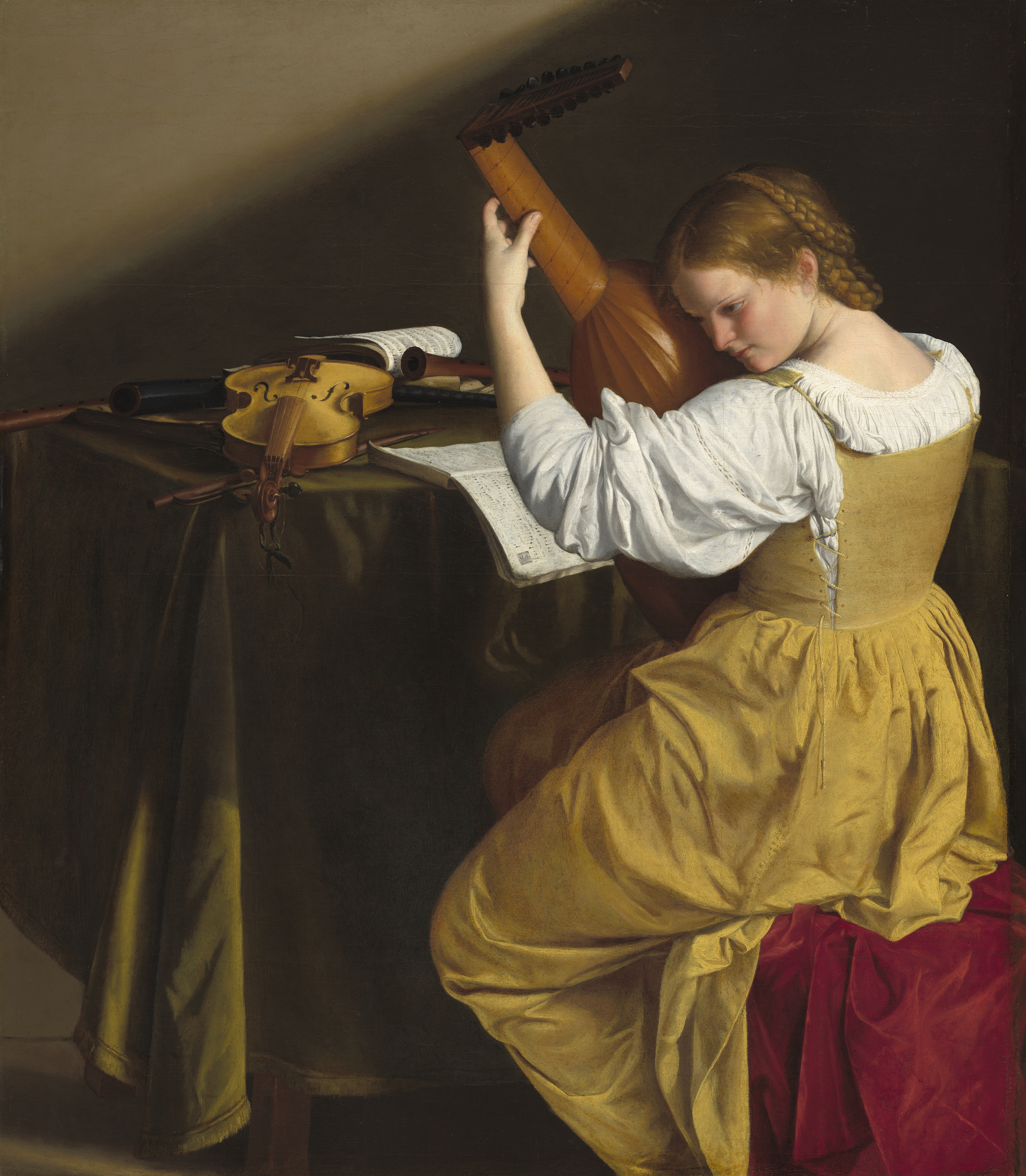
The Lute Player

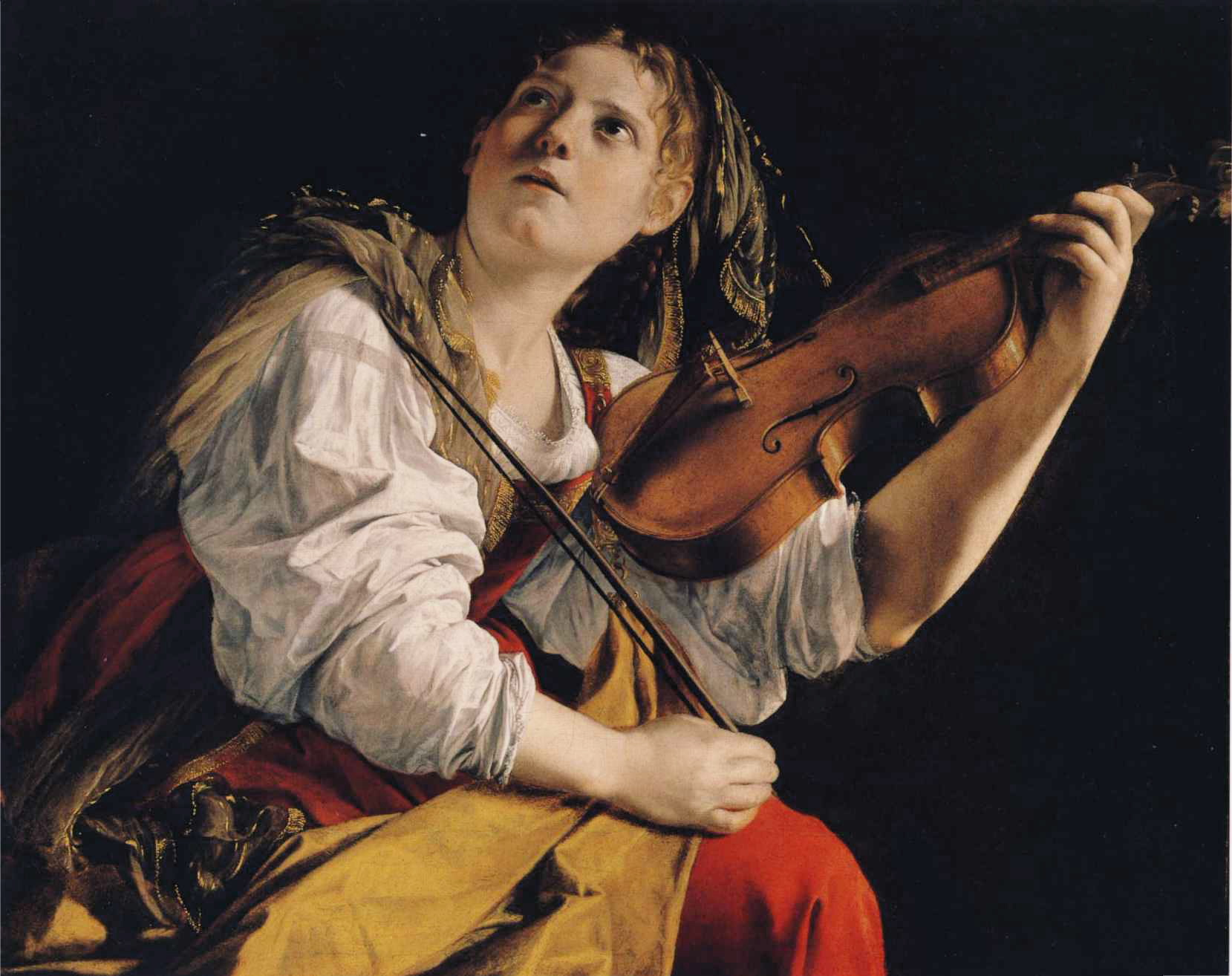
Young Woman Playing a Violin

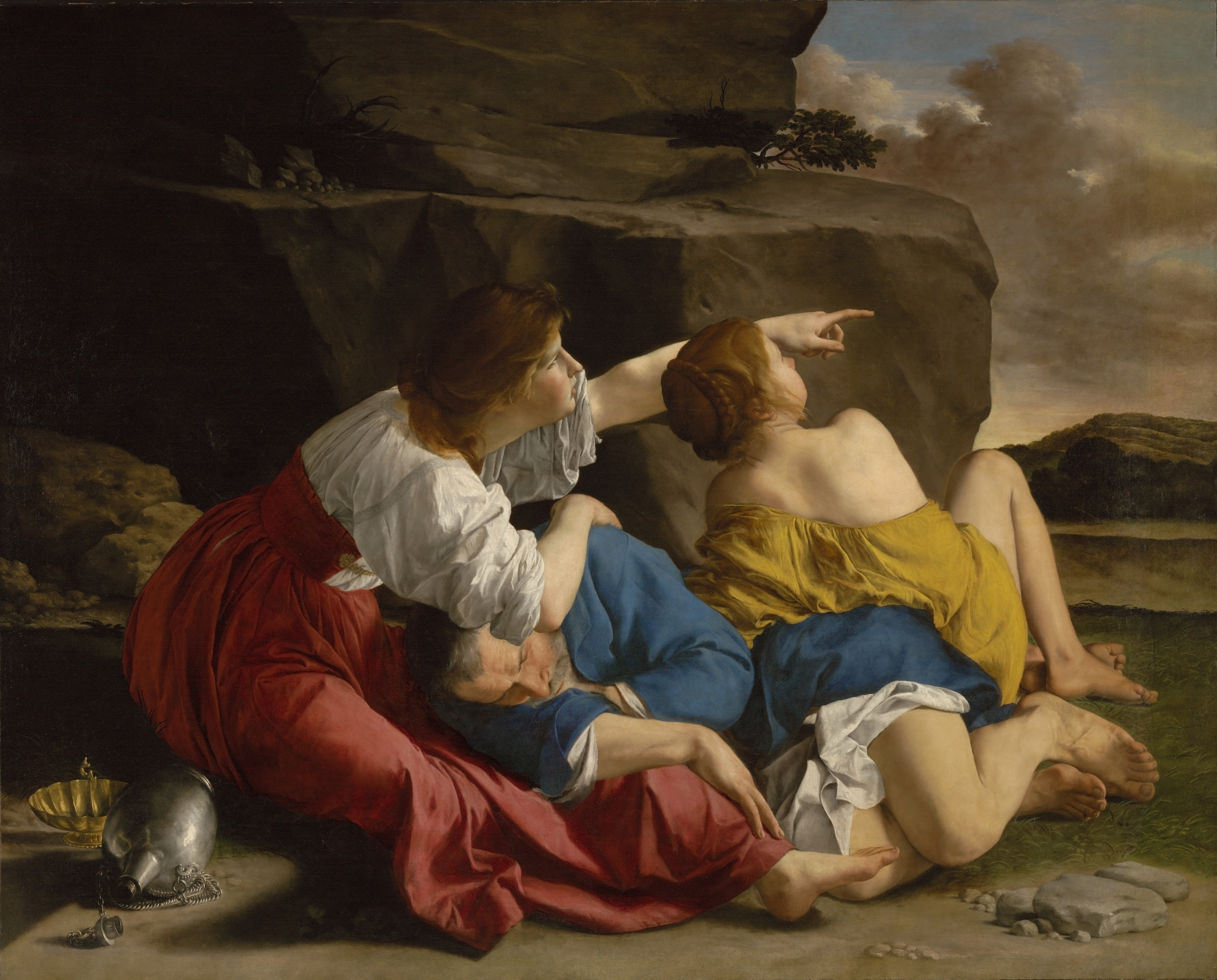
Lot and His Daughters

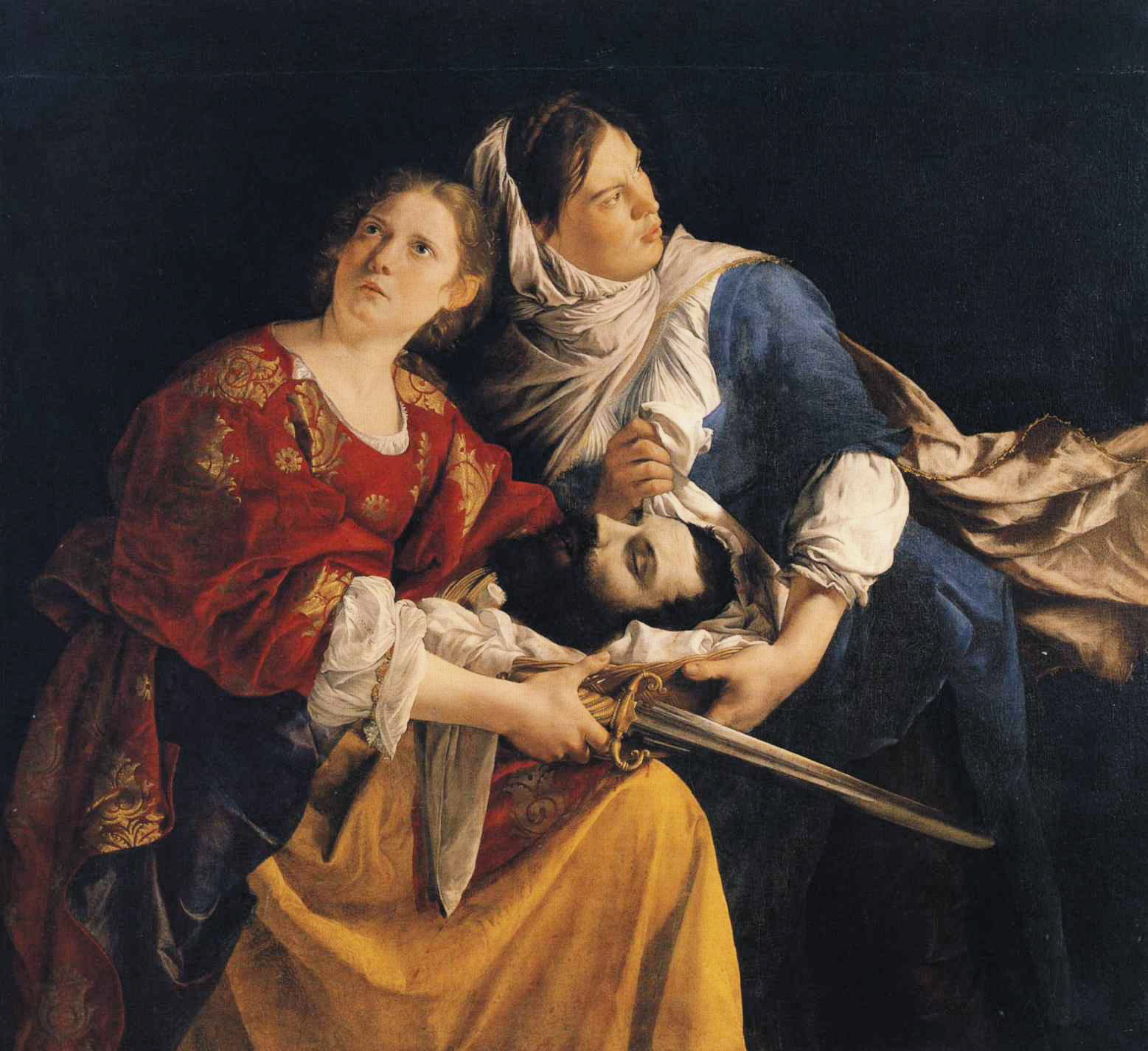
Judith and Her Maidservant with the Head of Holofernes

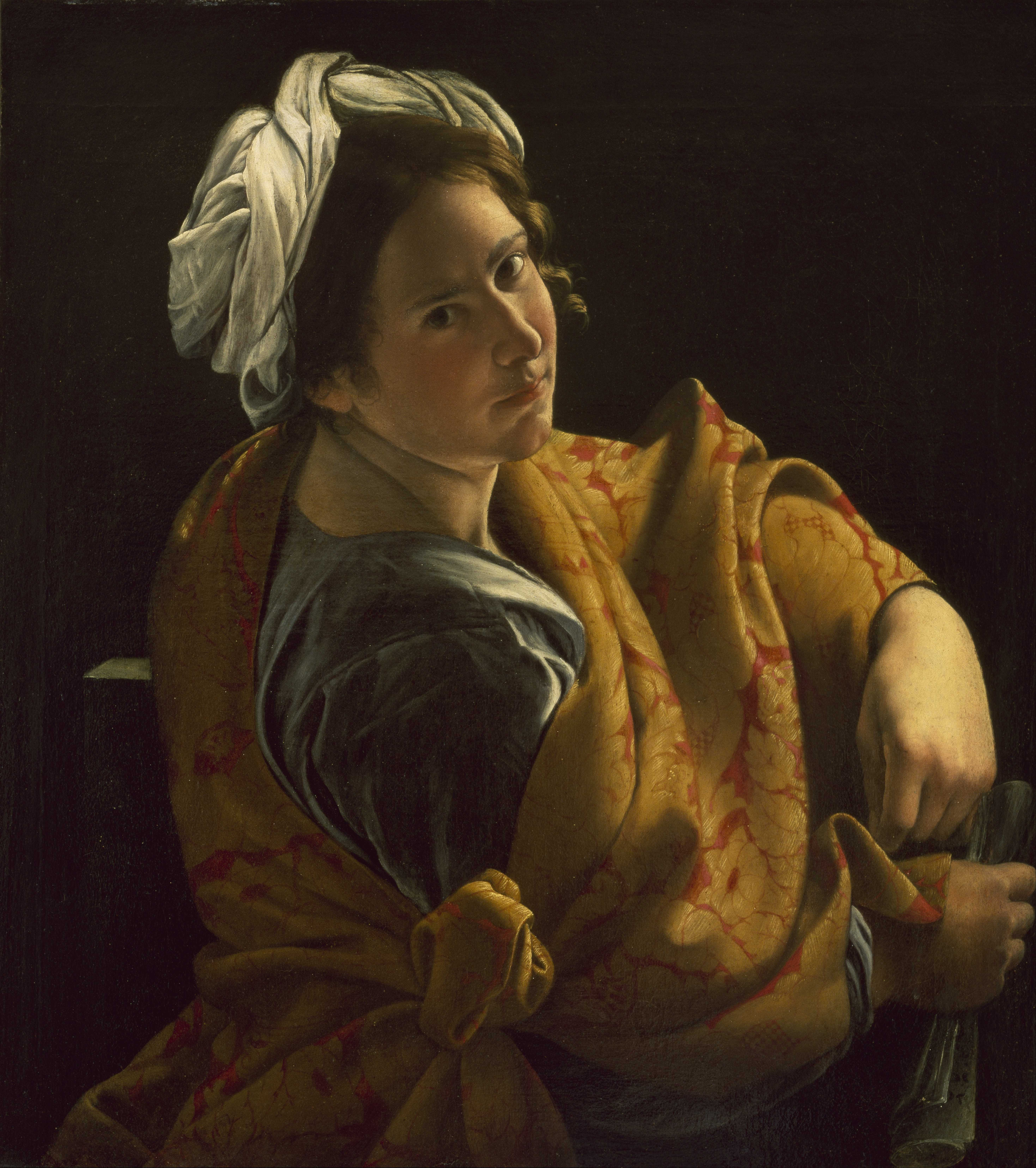
Portrait of a Young Woman as a Sibyl

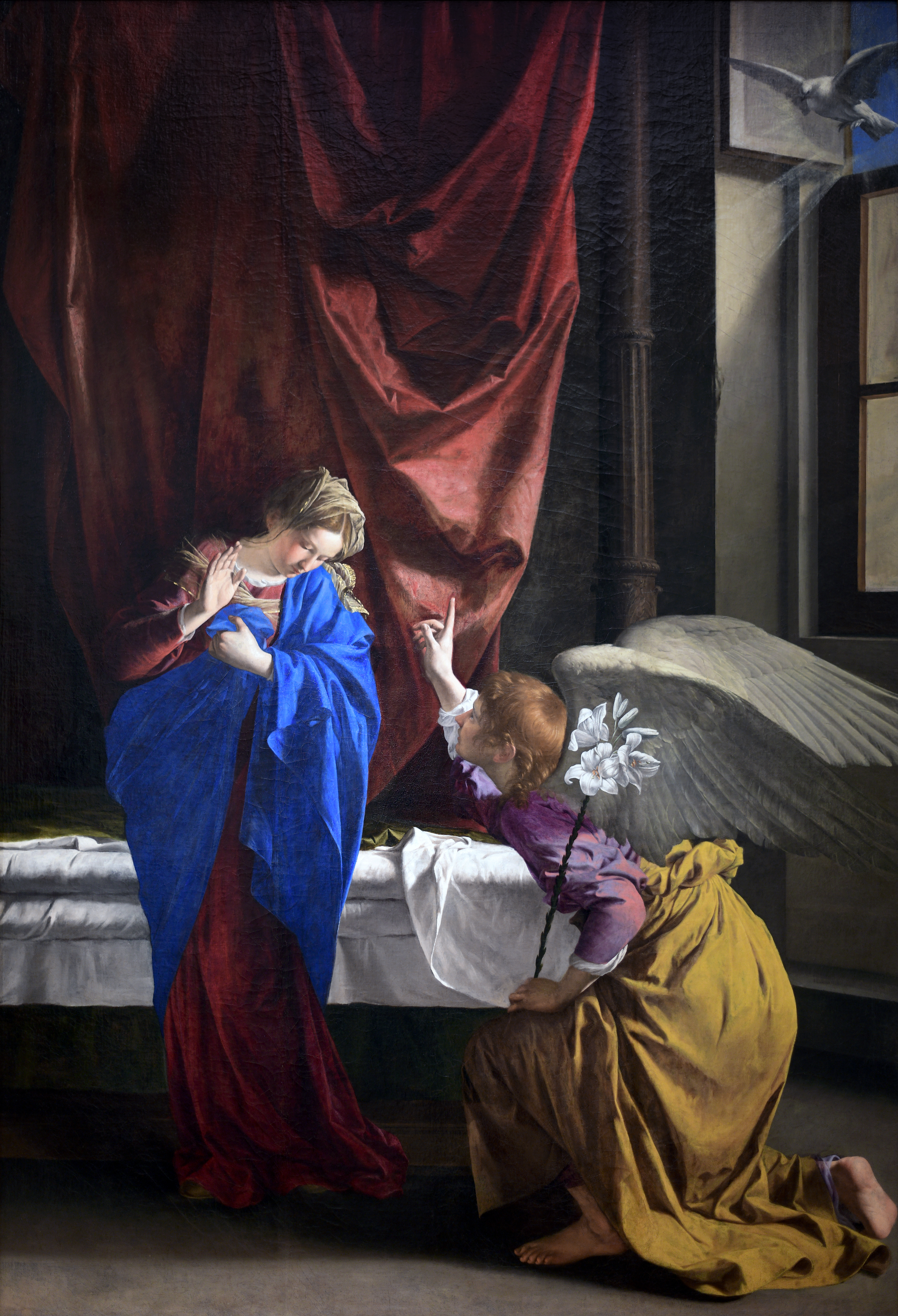
Annunciation

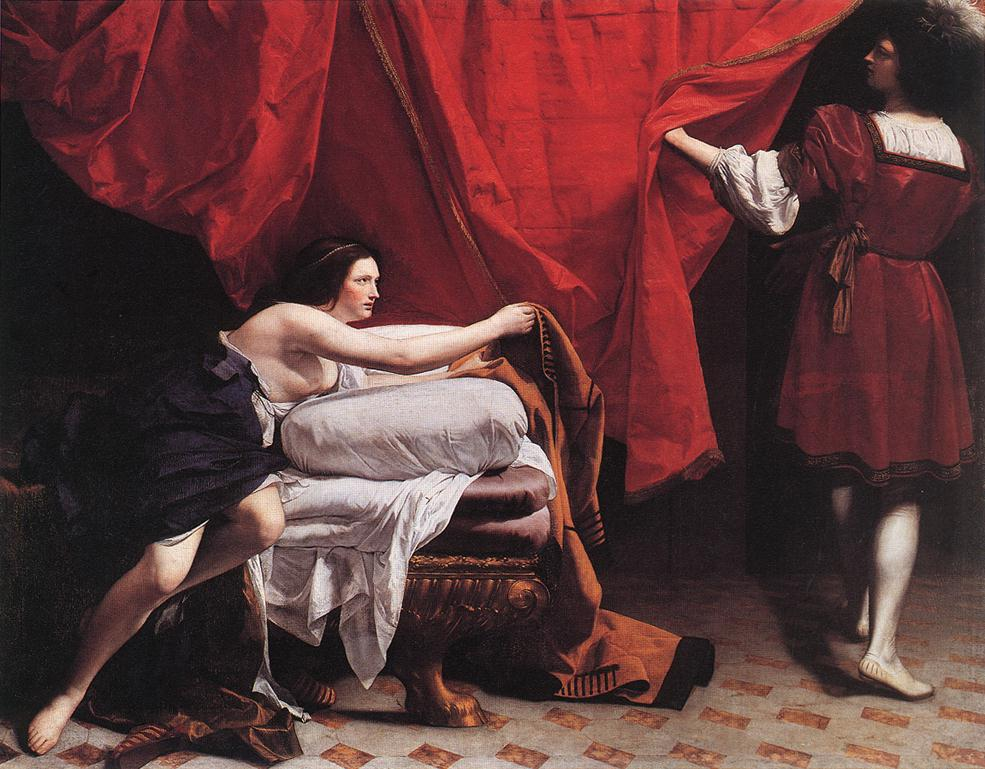
Joseph and Potiphar's Wife

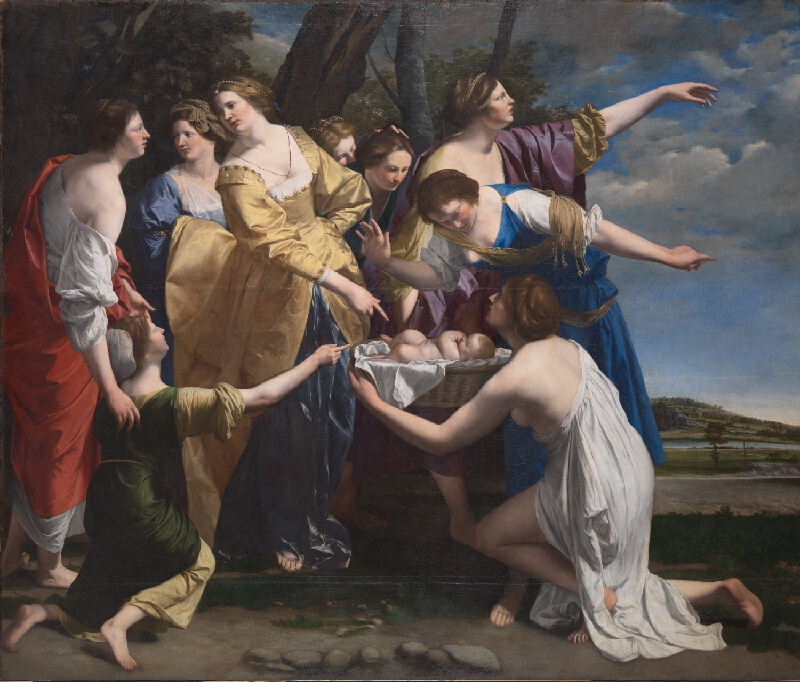
The Finding of Moses

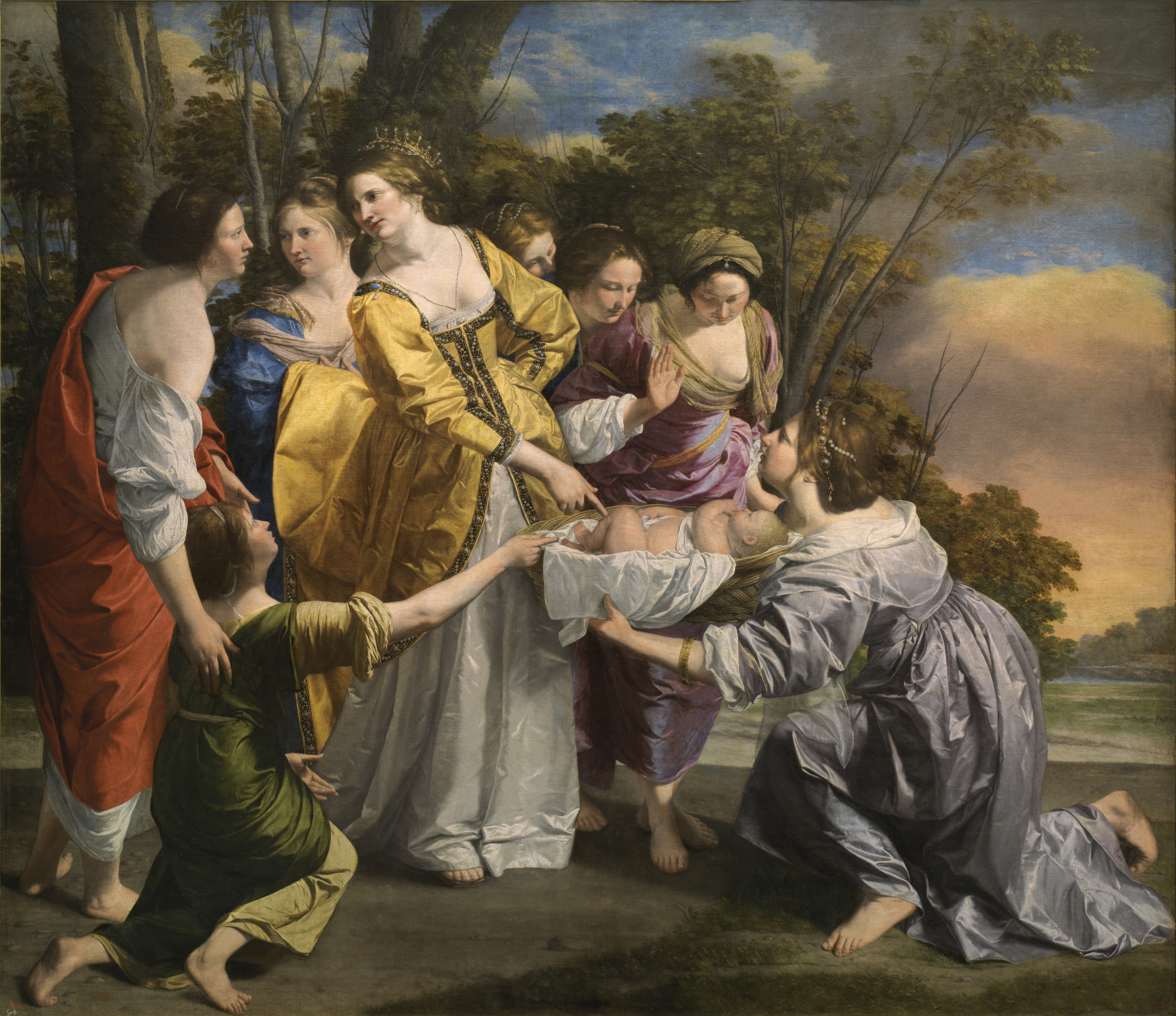
Moses in the basket

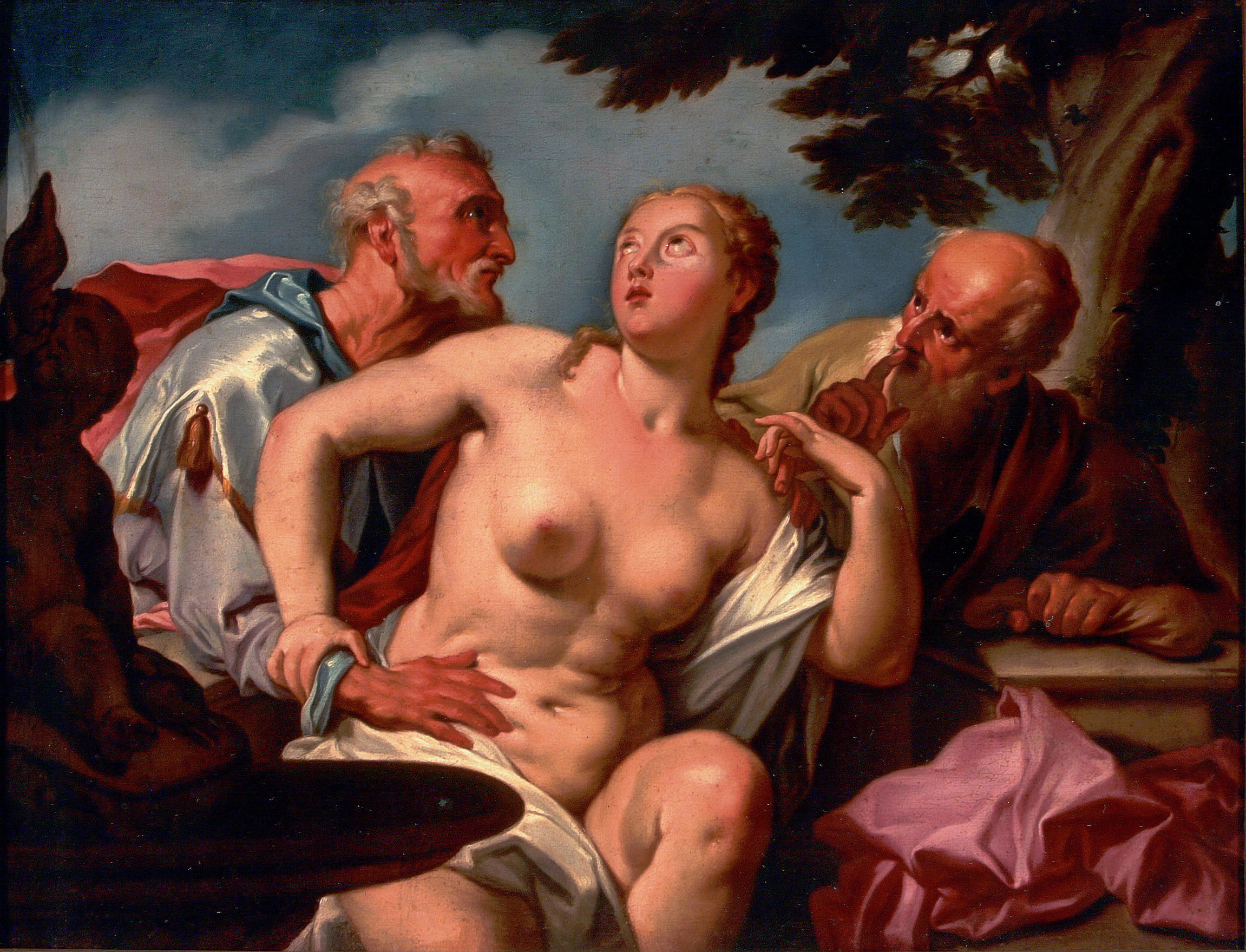
Susanna and the Elders

== Sources ==
- Orazio and Artemisia Gentileschi (Exhibition catalogue). New York: Metropolitan Museum of Art. 2002.
- The Genius of Rome 1592-1693 (Exhibition catalogue). London: Royal Academy of Arts. 2001.
- Sale of the Century:Artistic Relations between Spain and Great Britain1604–1655. Yale University Press in Association with Museo Nacional del Prado. 2002.
