= The Finding of Moses (Veronese) =

The Finding of Moses refers to several paintings of the Finding of Moses by Paolo Veronese and his studio. These include:

- The Finding of Moses (Veronese, Dijon)
- The Finding of Moses (Veronese, Dresden)
- The Finding of Moses (studio of Veronese, Liverpool)
- The Finding of Moses (Veronese, Lyon)
- The Finding of Moses (Veronese, Madrid)
- The Finding of Moses (Veronese, Smith collection)
- The Finding of Moses (studio of Veronese, Turin)
- The Finding of Moses (Washington)
