= The Finding of Moses (studio of Veronese, Liverpool) =

Painting by the studio of Paolo Veronese

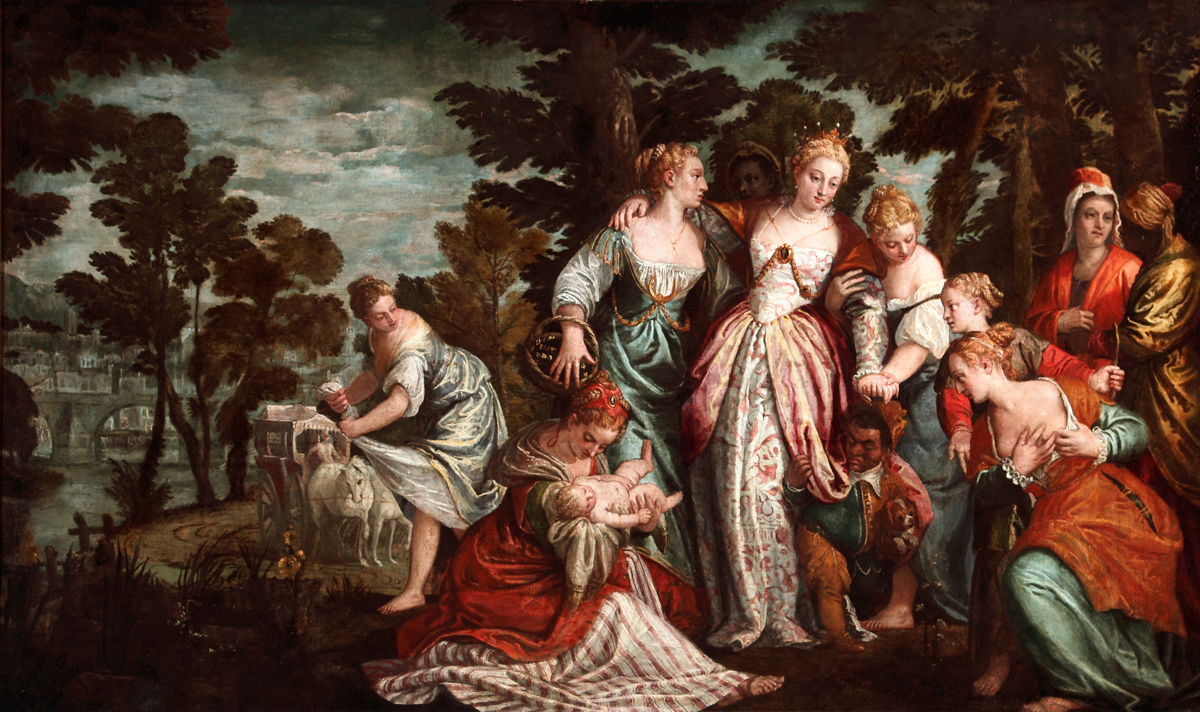
The Finding of Moses

The Finding of Moses is an oil-on-canvas painting, now in the Walker Art Gallery in Liverpool, to which it was formally transferred in 1948 by the Liverpool Royal Institution, to which it had been given in 1843 by J. W. Gibsone. It had hung at the Walker on loan since 1893. Previously thought to be an autograph work by Paolo Veronese, it is now thought to be largely or wholly by his studio. A copy of the work is now at the Musee des Beaux Arts de Dijon

It was described in 1646 by the Norman-French poet Jacques Dulorens It is one of at least eight works by Veronese and his studio on the subject of the finding of Moses. Fastnedge argued it was the version of the subject previously in the Orléans collection, which then passed to John Maitland's collection before being sold at Christie's in 1831, on the basis of the Liverpool Royal Institution's catalogue stating that their painting had come from the Orléans collection. However, the 1843 catalogue's assertion may simply have been an inference by comparison with Jean Louis Delignon's c.1786–1807 engraving of the Orléans collection painting (reversed and with significant differences in the background and foreground), whilst no independent evidence links the painting owned by Maitland to that given by Gibsone. Fastnedge acknowledged this difficulty and argued that the engraving showed the Liverpool painting before it was cut down to the size it now holds, but an early 17th-century Pierre Brebiette engraving shows the Liverpool work exactly as it now is.

After cleaning, Nicolson argued the work was a production of Veronese's studio, but Bernard Berenson argued it was a late and mostly autograph work and Rearick that it was a c.1581–1582 variant by Veronese's son Gabriele on the Dresden version, with the Dijon version another variant on the Dresden version by Benedetto, Gabriele's brother.
