= The Finding of Moses (Veronese, Smith collection) =

Lost painting by Paolo Veronese

The Finding of Moses is a now-lost oil on canvas painting of the finding of Moses by Paolo Veronese, once in the collection of Joseph Smith and one of at least eight works on the subject by the painter and his studio.

Smith's was distinctive in the pointing gesture by Pharaoh's daughter, shown in a preparatory drawing for it now in the Morgan Library & Museum and in a 1670s copy after the painting by Pietro Liberi (private collection). It seems to have been retained by Smith when he sold most of the rest of his collection to George III, selling it to another unknown buyer - a c.1720-1725 version of the subject by Sebastiano Ricci (Royal Collection) is thought to draw on this version and/or a surviving version by Veronese now in the Prado, perhaps to fill the gap left by the sale, one of at least nine copies made by Ricci of Veronese works for Smith.

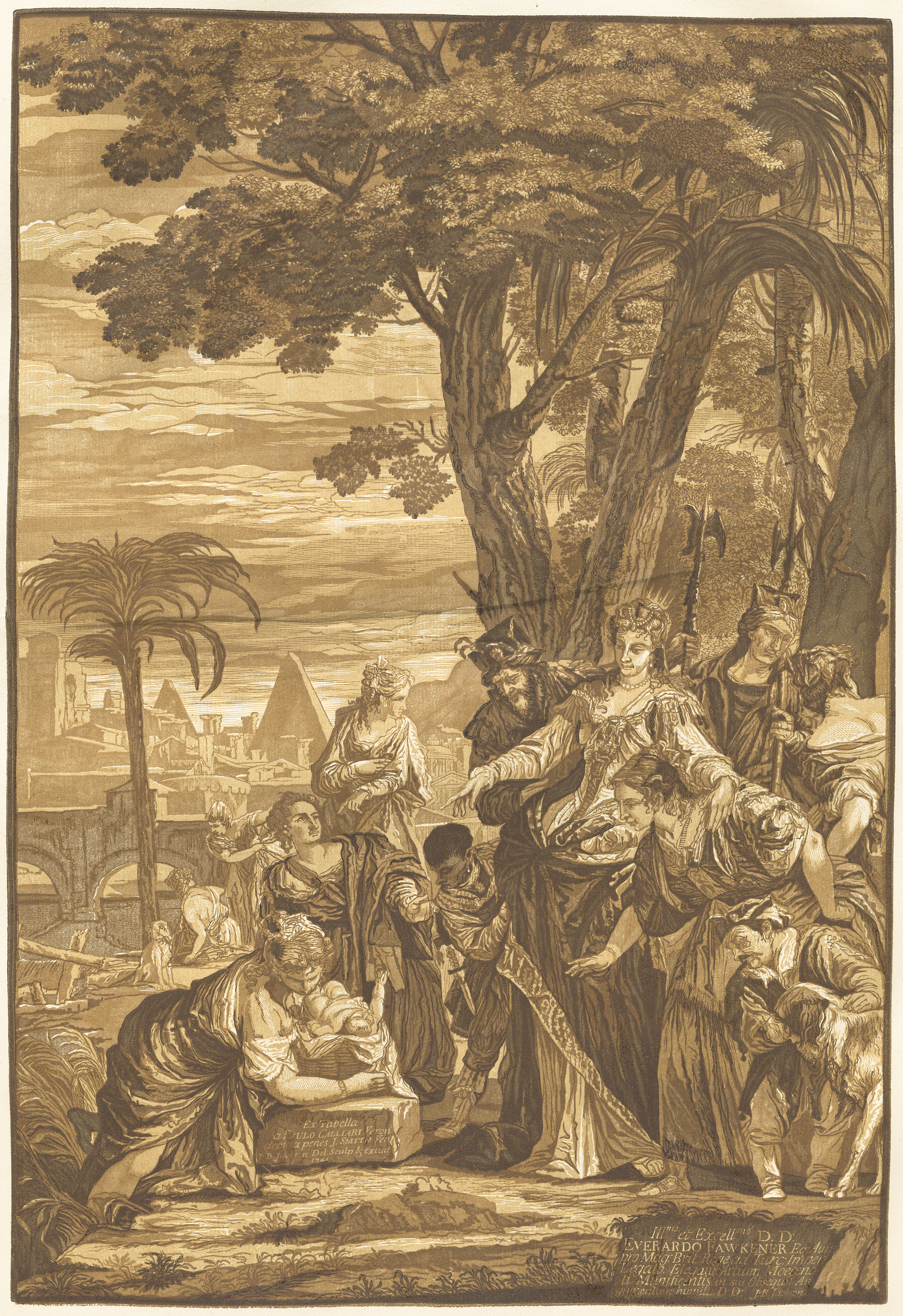
Engraving by John Baptist Jackson after Veronese, after the painting in the Joseph Smith collection

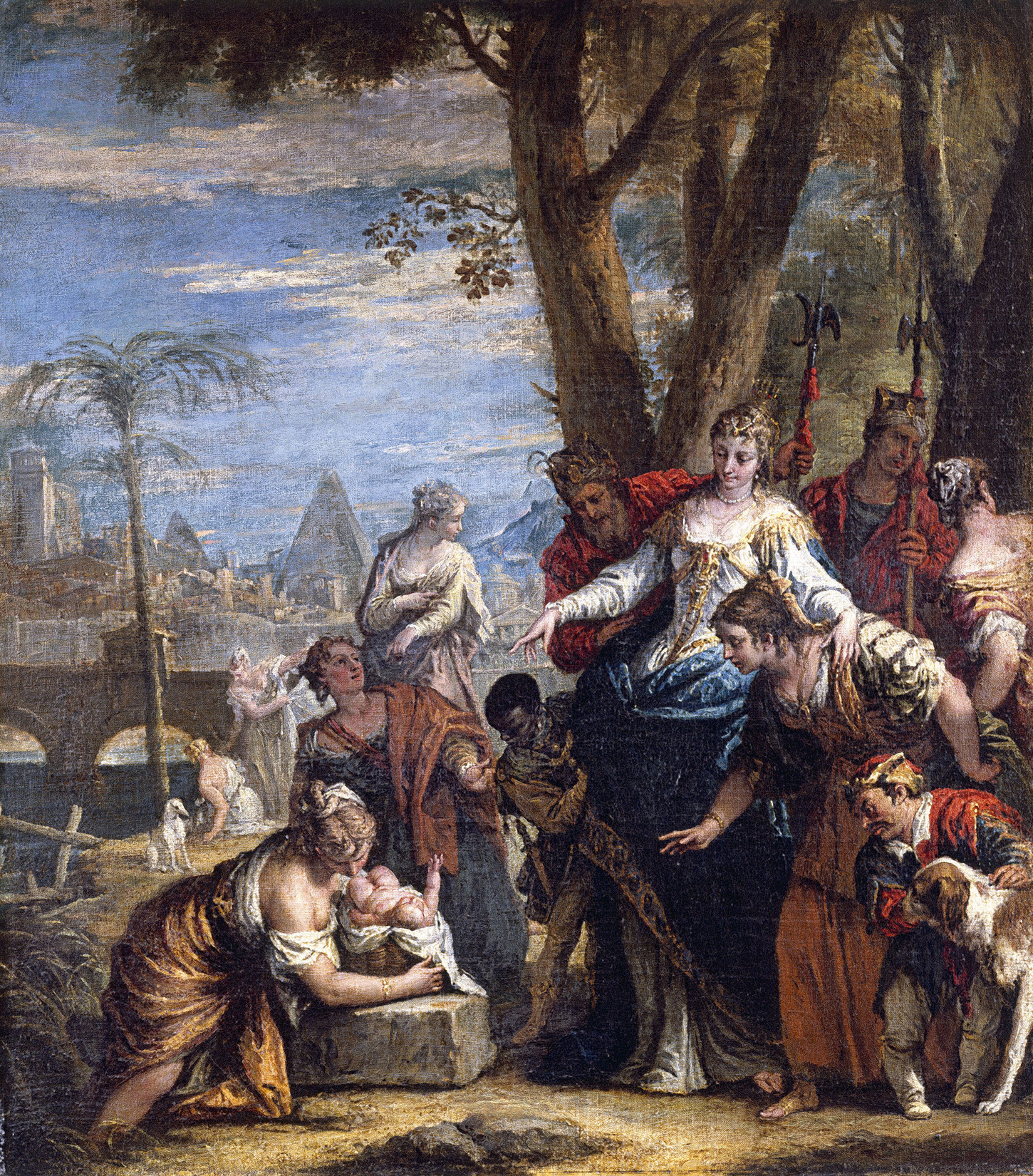
Painting in the Royal collection by Sebastiano Ricci

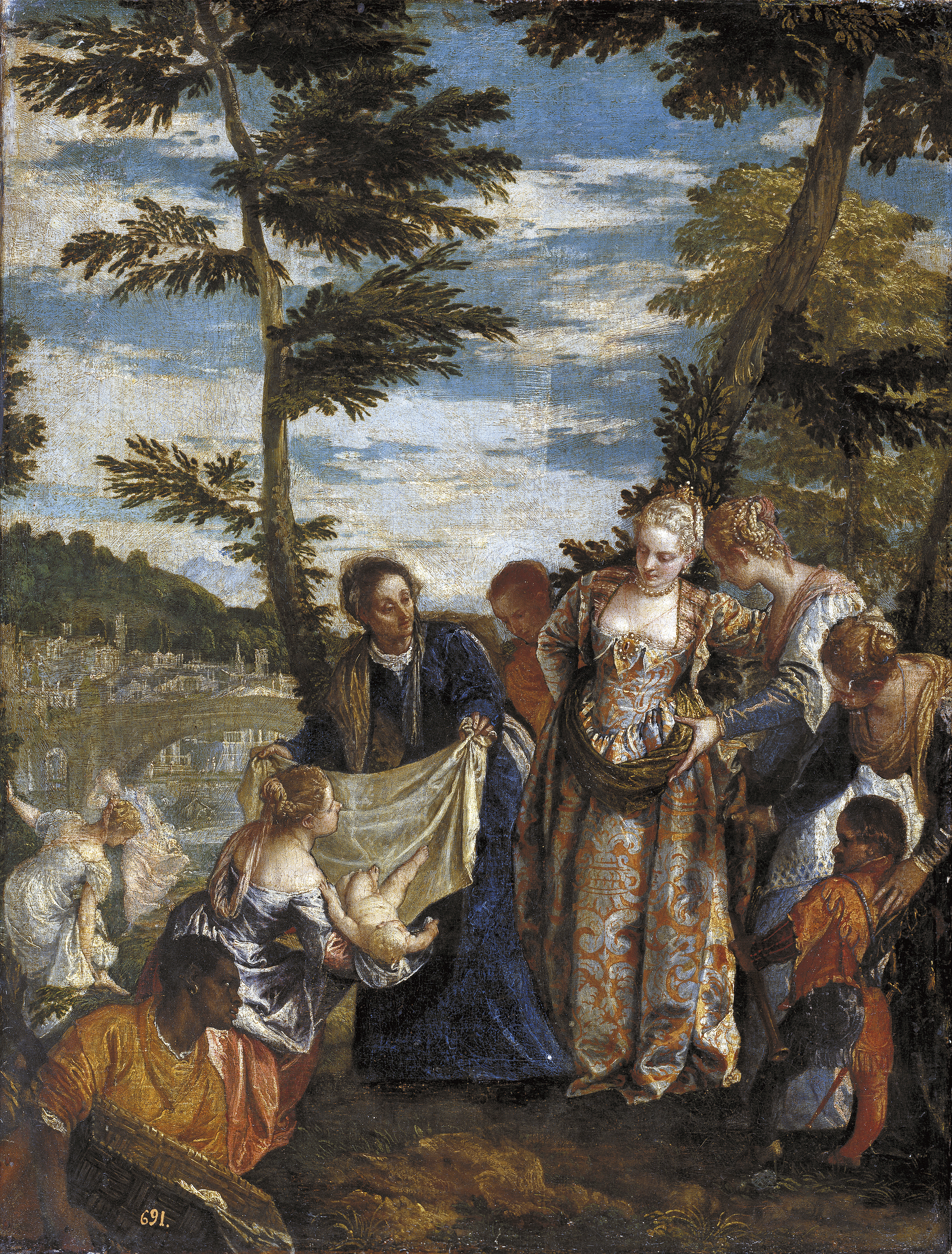
Version by Veronese in the Prado
