= The Finding of Moses (Veronese, Dijon) =

Painting by Paolo Veronese

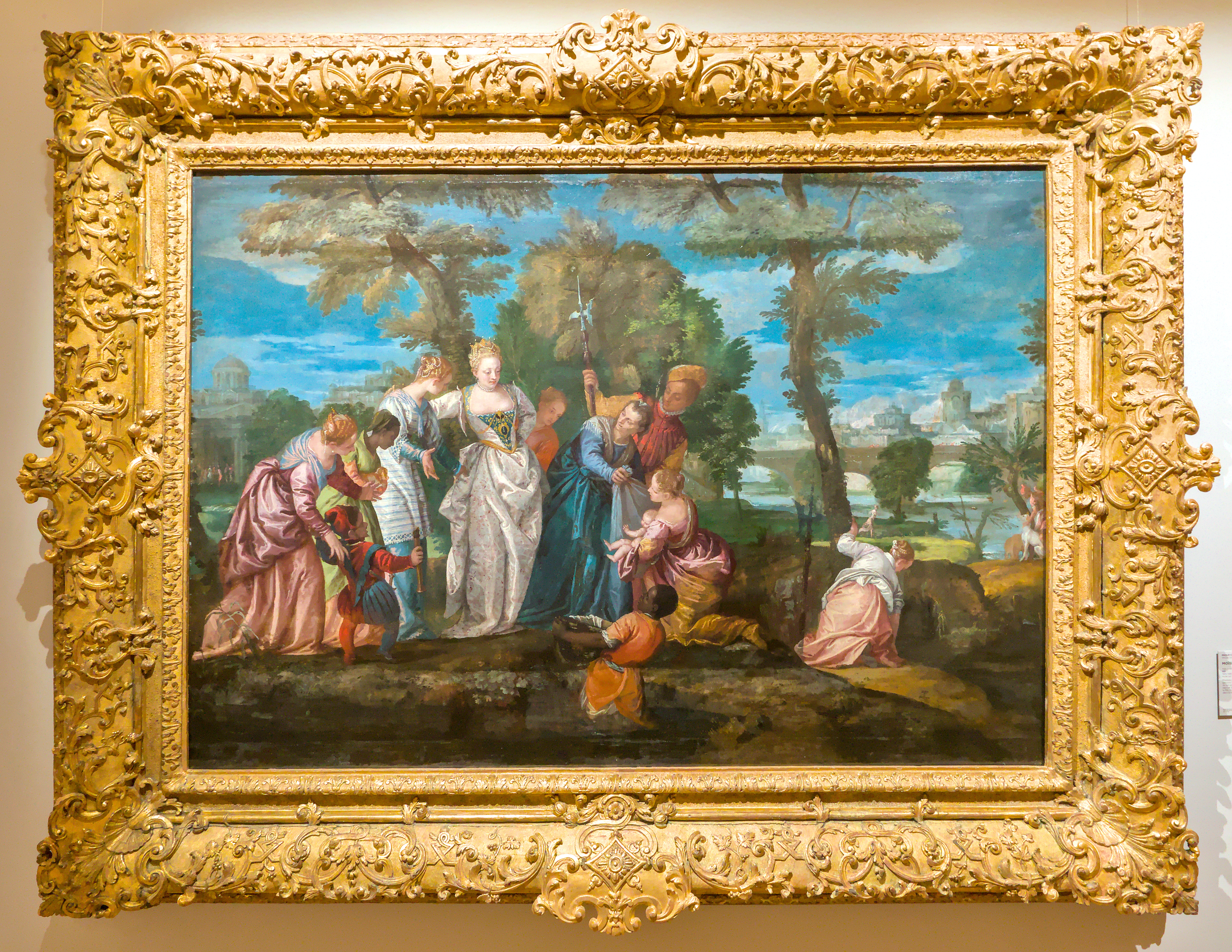
The Finding of Moses (1580) by Paolo Veronese

The Finding of Moses is a 1580 oil-on-canvas painting by Paolo Veronese of the finding of Moses, which has been in the Musee des Beaux Arts de Dijon since 1812. Its attribution to Veronese is early, with Lépicié stating it was "painted by the artist at the height of his powers", though Louis Clément de Ris argued it was a copy in 1861. It is now thought to be largely autograph with studio assistance as argued by Florence Ingersoll-Smouse in 1928, Bernard Berenson in 1932 and 1936 (though in 1957-1958 he changed his mind and argued it was a studio work) and Giuseppe Fiocco in 1934.

It was acquired by the Duc de Créquy either from the painter Pierre Mignard's collection or with Mignard as an intermediary for the Lesdiguières family. In July or August 1687 it was bought from the Duc de Créquy's wife by Louis XIV to hang at the Palace of Versailles along with a Domenichino of Madonna and St Anthony of Padua with Children for a total of 5243 livres, 6 sous and 8 deniers. It is recorded by Paillet at Versailles in 1695 and by another source as being in the Château de Meudon early in the 18th century, where it still hung in 1706. Dezallier d'Argenville recorded it among the Veroneses in the French royal collection in both 1745 and 1762.

Among the other versions of the subject by Veronese and his studio (at least eight survive), the work is closest to the Dresden variant, though it also draws the small boy from the Madrid version. It can also be linked to a copy in the Uffizi, a variant known via an engraving by Nicolas Cochin and the lost painting offered to the Venetian Da Neice by Charles I of England.
