= The Finding of Moses (Veronese, Lyon) =

Painting by Paolo Veronese

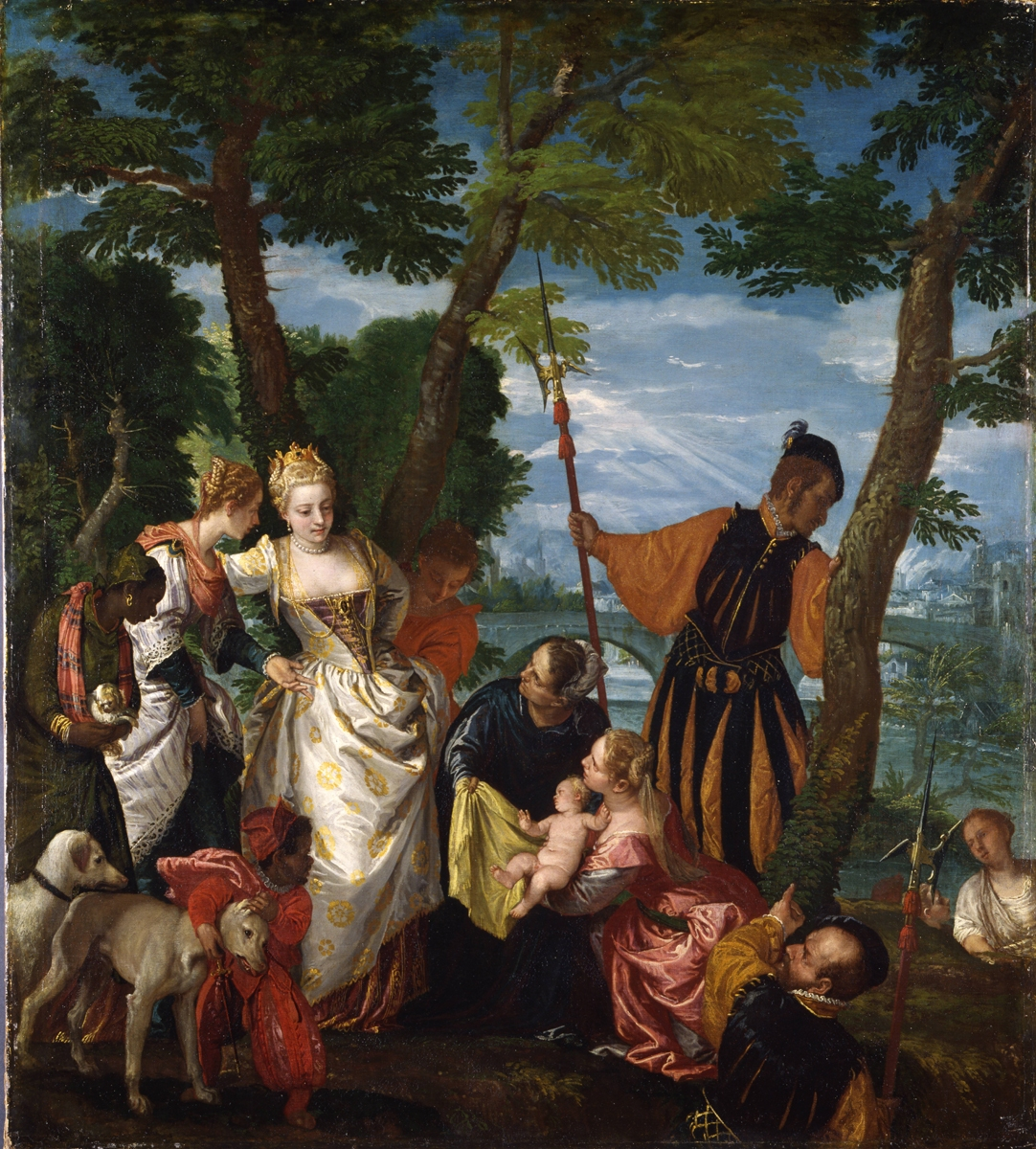
The Finding of Moses (c. 1581) by Paolo Veronese

The Finding of Moses is a c.1581 oil-on-canvas painting by Paolo Veronese. It is the smallest (119 by 115 cm) of at least eight works on the subject by him and his studio showing the finding of Moses – art historians often consider it to be the preparatory sketch for the variant in Dresden.

The work was recorded in the Paris collection of Jean Néret de la Ravoye, receiver general for Poitiers. It was then acquired by Louis XIV in 1685 for 5500 livres (now equivalent to about 220,000,000 Euros), at the time the ninth most expensive work the King had ever acquired, appearing as such in Charles Le Brun's inventory of Louis' collection. It was hung at the Palace of Versailles by 1695 at the latest and was recorded as hanging in the Louvre in 1737, at which date it returned to Versailles. It remained there until being moved to the Palais du Luxembourg in Paris in 1784 then at the Muséum central des Arts from 1793 onwards. In 1803 the French state sent it to its present location
