= The Finding of Moses (Alma-Tadema) =

1904 painting by Lawrence Alma-Tadema

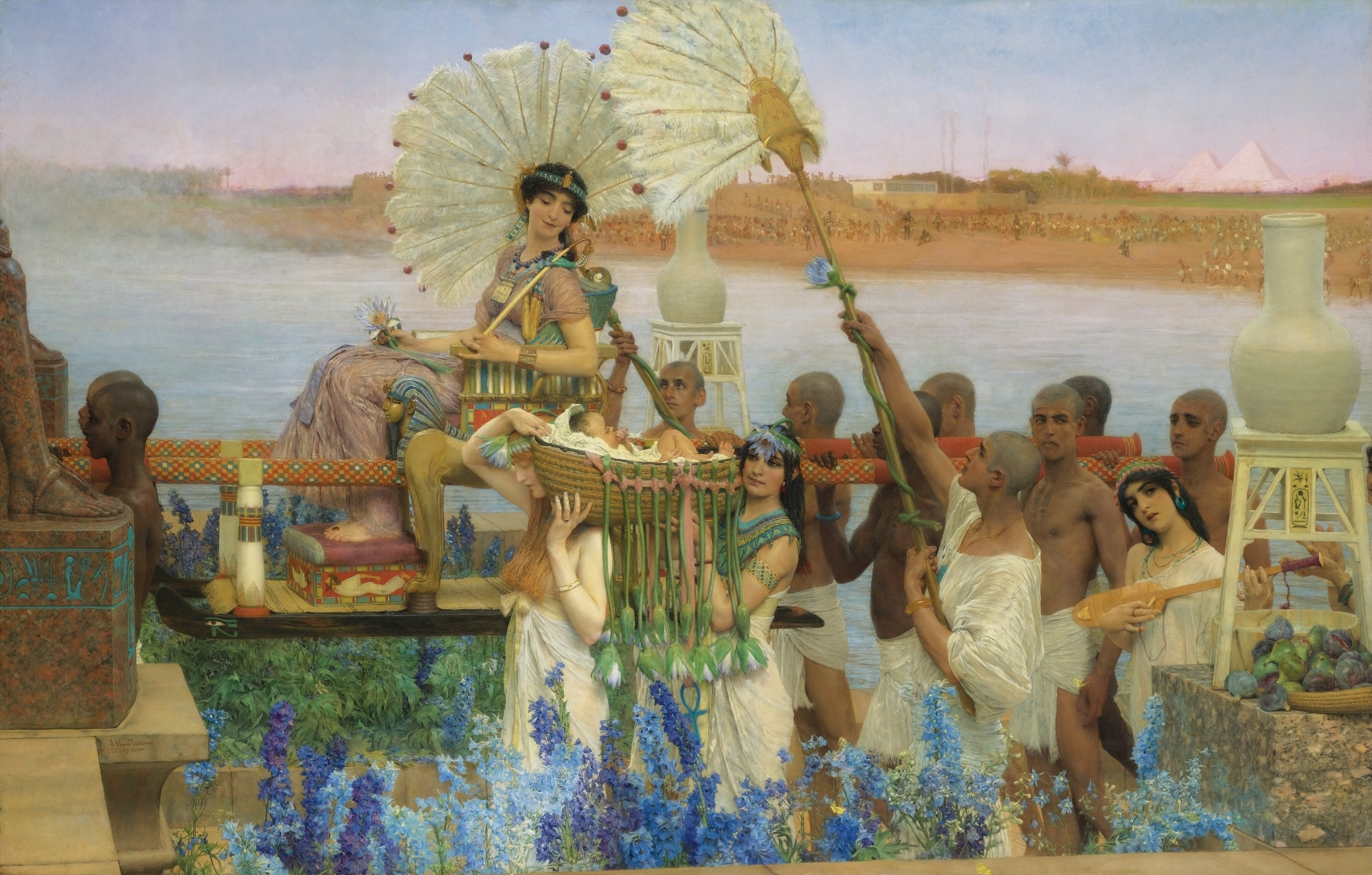
- Artist: Lawrence Alma-Tadema
- Year: 1904
- Medium: oil on canvas
- Dimensions: 136.7 cm × 213.4 cm (53.8 in × 84.0 in)
- Location: Private collection

The Finding of Moses is an oil-on-canvas painting by the Anglo-Dutch artist Lawrence Alma-Tadema, from 1904. It was one of his last major works before his death in 1912, but quickly fell out of favour; according to rumour, it was sold in the 1950s for its frame. After appreciation of Victorian painting was renewed towards the end of the 20th century, it was described in an auction catalogue in 1995 as "the undisputed masterpiece of [Alma-Tadema's] last decade, as well as a late (perhaps the final?) flowering of the nineteenth-century's love-affair with Egypt". It was sold to a private collector at auction in 2010 for nearly US$36 million.

The Finding of Moses had been a popular subject for paintings since the Renaissance, with a revival in the 19th century by Orientalist artists keen to add authentic archaeological decor to their depictions.

== Background ==
The painting was commissioned by Sir John Aird, 1st Baronet for 5,000 guineas, plus expenses. Aird's civil engineering business, John Aird & Co., was responsible for building the first Aswan Dam. Aird invited Alma-Tadema to visit Egypt for the opening of the dam in December 1902, and commissioned him to paint a suitable subject to add to Aird's large collection of academic paintings by the likes of Frederic Leighton, Edward Poynter, and John William Waterhouse, including Alma-Tadema's 1888 work The Roses of Heliogabalus. The commission allowed Alma-Tadema to revisit Egyptian themes from his works in the 1860s.

== Description ==
The work is a Biblical scene based on chapter 2, verse 6 of the Book of Exodus, in which Pharaoh's daughter comes to wash in the River Nile, and finds the infant Moses abandoned in a basket in the reeds. The painting depicts the scene after the infant has been discovered, showing a procession travelling back to the daughter's abode in Memphis, the capital of the Old Kingdom of Egypt. The Finding of Moses had been a popular scene for painters, especially since the Late Renaissance.

Shaven-headed male attendant in white loincloths carry Pharaoh's daughter in an elaborately decorated chair. She wears a pink diaphanous gown and elaborate jewellery, and holds a flail in her left hand, a symbol of royalty; in her right hand, she holds a lotus flower. The style and decoration of her chair is informed by illustrations of Egyptian tomb paintings. Her feet rest on a footstool decorated with bound captives — another symbol of royalty — and also referring to the enslaved Israelites. Hieroglyphic cartouches identify her as the daughter of Ramesses II. It has been claimed that one of Alma-Tadema's daughters sat as the model for Pharaoh's daughter. Two male attendants wave ostrich feather fans, while two female attendants carry Moses in his cradle alongside. The cradle has been decorated with lotus flowers, tied on with a pink ribbon. Another female attendant plays a stringed instrument.

The painting is composed like a frieze, with bright blues and purples of delphiniums in the foregrounds; the procession passing behind; a space for the river; and then, in the background, on the other bank of the river, teams of slaves can be seen labouring under their dark-skinned overseers, possibly working on the pyramids at Giza on the opposite bank. The blues of the flowers are echoed by the lapis lazuli inlay of the chair, but contrast with yellows, oranges, reds and pinks.

The plinth and feet of a red granite statue are just visible to the front left, possibly copied from a statue of Seti II in the British Museum. The plinth bears more hieroglyphics, reading "Beloved of Ra, King of Upper and Lower Egypt,"

== Reception ==
Alma-Tadema worked on the painting for two years. King Edward VII visited Alma-Tadema in his studio while the work was being completed. By the time it was finished, his wife wryly quipped that the infant Moses would now be "two years old, and need no longer be carried".

The painting was exhibited at the Royal Academy summer exhibition in 1905; the same year, Alma-Tadema became one of the first 18 members of the Order of Merit. The work was received with warm but not enthusiastic praise.

Alma-Tadema's works fell dramatically out of favour after his death in 1912, but provided inspiration for the set designers of Biblical epics such as D. W. Griffith's Intolerance (1916), and Cecil B. DeMille's Cleopatra (1934) and The Ten Commandments (1956) (in 1968 Mario Amaya published an article in The Sunday Times entitled "The Painter who Inspired Hollywood").

After Aird's death in 1911, the painting was inherited by his son Sir John Richard Aird, 2nd Baronet, and then following his death in 1934 it was sold by his son Sir John Renton Aird, 3rd Baronet at Christie's in London in May 1935, and acquired by an art dealer for 820 guineas. The painting was sold to Sir Jeremiah Colman, 1st Baronet, and then after his death in January 1942 it was auctioned at Christie's in September 1942, acquired by a different dealer for 260 guineas. It was sold to F. W. Reeves of Wolverhampton, and then sold at a country auction in September 1950, and acquired by London dealer Newman.

In a widely reported, but probably apocryphal, story, the painting was reputedly sold to an English couple for a small sum. They had no interest in the unfashionable painting, buying the work for the frame, by Thomas Maw: after leaving the dealers, they removed the painting from its frame, and the artwork was found minutes later abandoned in an alley in St James's near the gallery. Bernard Hart, a director of Newman's at the time, wrote to The Times to dispute the story: in his account, more prosaically, the gallery failed to find a museum willing to take the picture, even as a gift, and it remained unsold when sent to Christie's by Newman's in December 1960. It was "bought in" by the auction house, and eventually acquired to decorate the walls of the Clock House Restaurant near Welwyn in Hertfordshire.

The painting was sold to the London art dealers in July 1967, and sold on to Ira Spanierman Galleries in New York shortly afterwards for $8,500; in turn, they sold it on to Allen Funt for $25,000. Funt was the producer of Candid Camera, and a collector of Alma-Tadema's at a time when his works remained deeply unfashionable. The painting was included in an exhibition at the Metropolitan Museum of Art in New York in March and April 1973, entitled "Victorians in Togas". After Funt experienced financial troubles, he sold the painting along with the rest of his collection at Sotheby's in London in November 1973, for around $72,000. Reportedly, he kept the original frames and put in photos of the paintings that he had sold.

The painting was bought by a private collector, and then sold to another private collector at Christie's in New York in May 1995 for US$2,752,500, before being sold again at Sotheby's for US$35,922,500 (including buyer's premium) in November 2010.
