= The Finding of Moses (studio of Veronese, Turin) =

Painting by the studio of Paolo Veronese

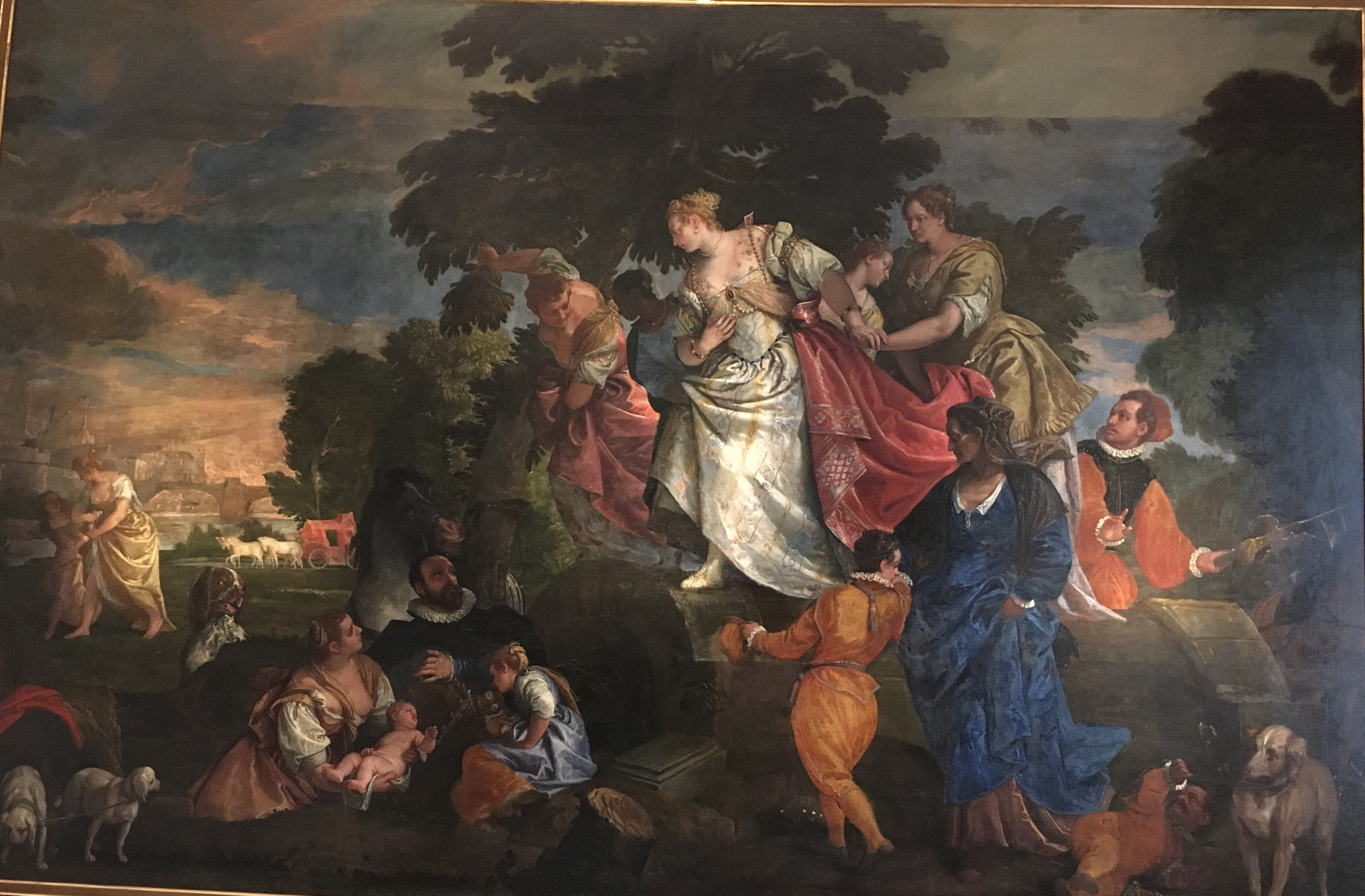
The Finding of Moses (c. 1582–1598)

The Finding of Moses is an oil on canvas painting attributed to Paolo Veronese or produced by his studio, from c. 1582-1598. It is held in the Galleria Sabauda, in Turin.
