= The Finding of Moses (Veronese, Madrid) =

Painting by Paolo Veronese

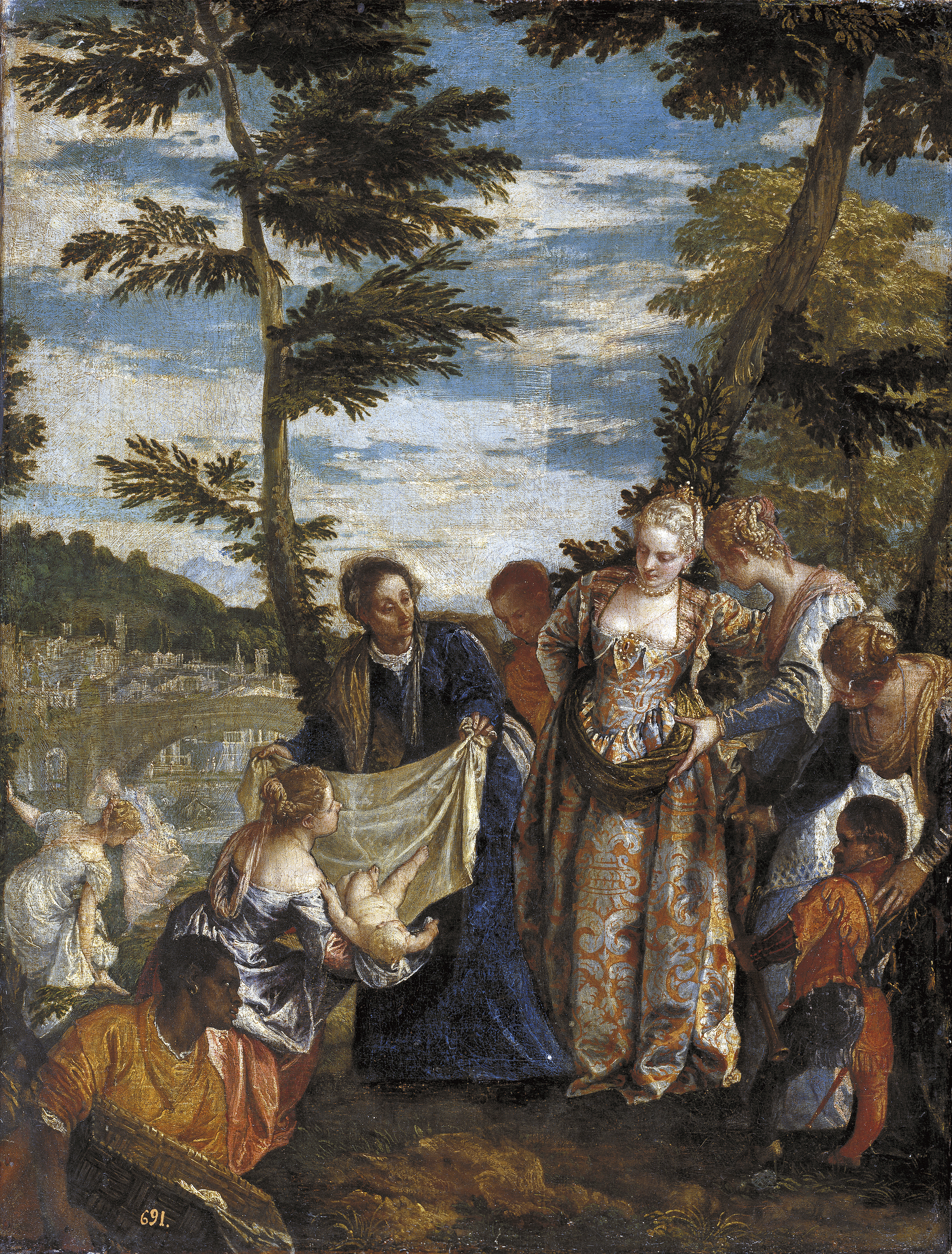
The Finding of Moses (c. 1580) by Paolo Veronese

The Finding of Moses is an oil-on-canvas painting by Paolo Veronese, executed c. 1580. It is held in the Museo del Prado, in Madrid. It is one of at least eight variants of the subject of the finding of Moses by him and his studio.
