= The Finding of Moses (Veronese, Dresden) =

Painting by Paolo Veronese

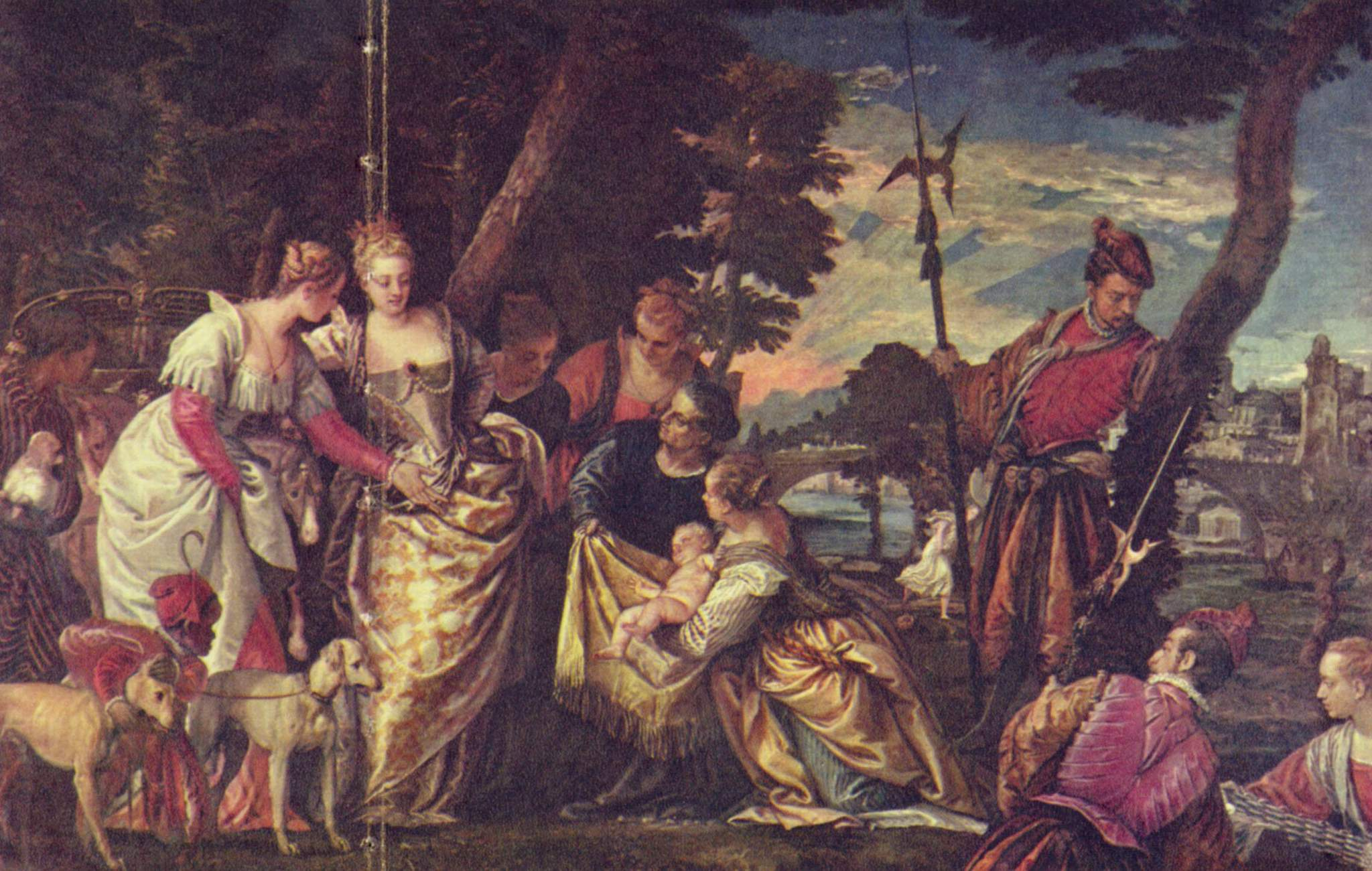
The Finding of Moses (c. 1581-1582) by Paolo Veronese

The Finding of Moses is an oil-on-canvas painting by Paolo Veronese, from c. 1581-1582. It is held now in the Gemäldegalerie Alte Meister, in Dresden and measures 178 by 277 cm. It is one of at least eight works on the finding of Moses by Veronese and his studio – another now in Lyon is thought to be the preparatory sketch for the Dresden work.
