= Finding of Moses =

Story from Exodus in the Hebrew Bible

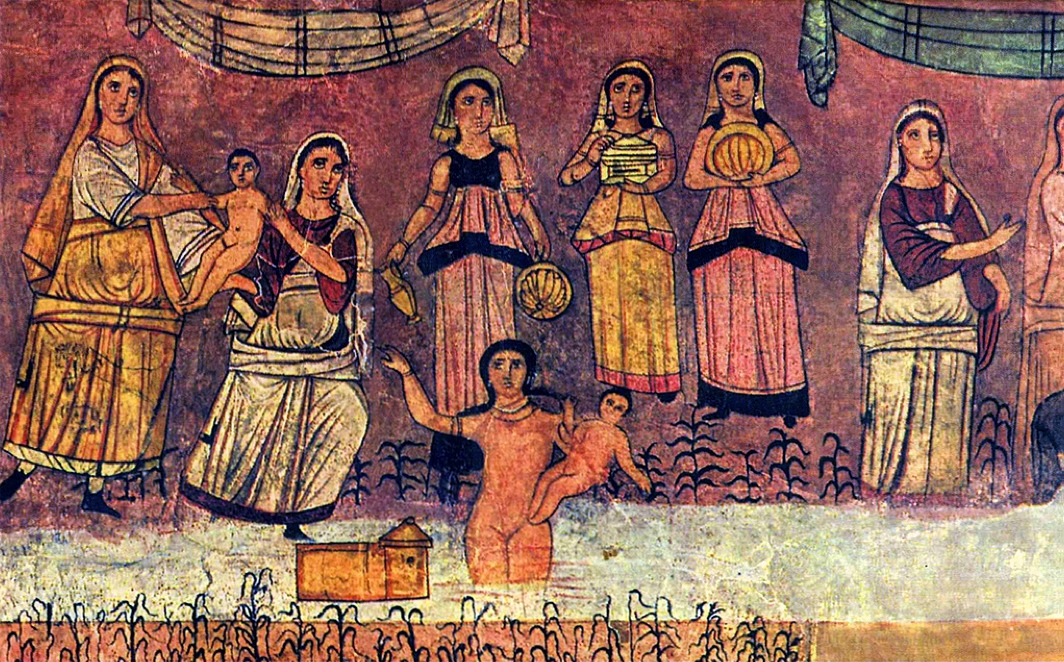
Fresco in the Dura-Europos synagogue, about 244 CE

The Finding of Moses, sometimes called "Moses in the Bulrushes", "Moses Saved from the Waters", (Note: This is standard in the Romance languages, eg "Moïse sauvé des eaux" is the standard title in French.) or other variants, is the story in chapter 2 of the Book of Exodus in the Hebrew Bible of the finding in the River Nile of Moses as a baby by the daughter of Pharaoh. The story became a common subject in art, especially from the Renaissance onwards.

Depictions in Jewish and Islamic art are much less frequent, but some Christian depictions show details derived from extra-biblical Jewish texts. The earliest surviving depiction in art is a fresco in the Dura-Europos synagogue, dating to around 244. The motif of a "naked princess" bathing in the river has been related to much later art. A contrasting tradition, beginning in the Renaissance, gave great attention to the rich costumes of the princess and her entourage.

Moses was a central figure in Jewish tradition and was given various significances in Christian thought. He was regarded as a typological precursor of Jesus. He could also, at times, be regarded as a precursor or allegorical representation of things as diverse as the Pope, Venice, the Dutch Republic, or Louis XIV.

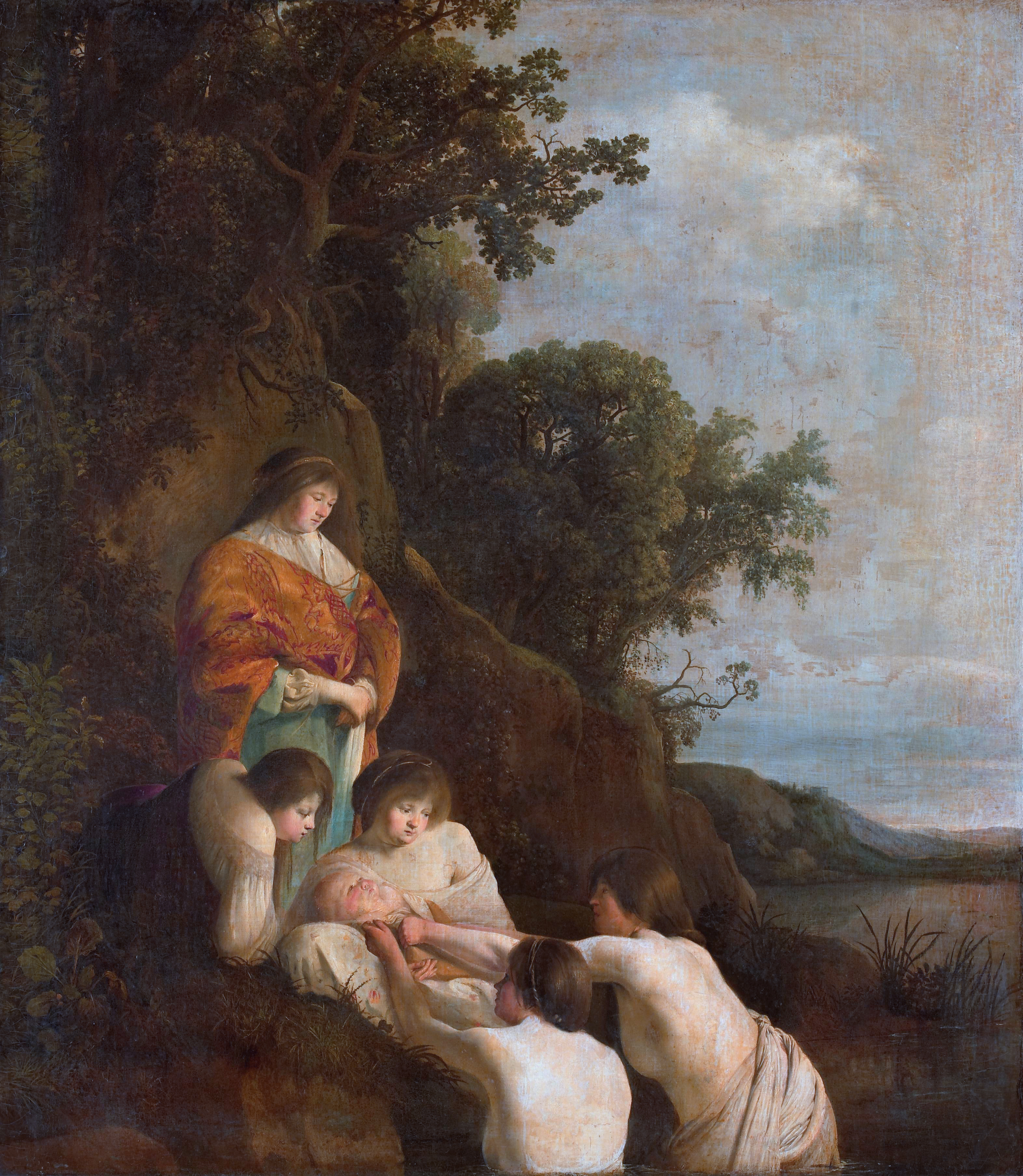
Paulus Bor and Cornelis Hendriksz Vroom, 1630s

The subject also represented a case of a foundling or abandoned child, a significant social issue in modern times. The subject is unusual in standard history painting in that it requires a number of female figures, but apart from the baby, no male figures are necessary. Many painters took the opportunity to depict female nudes.

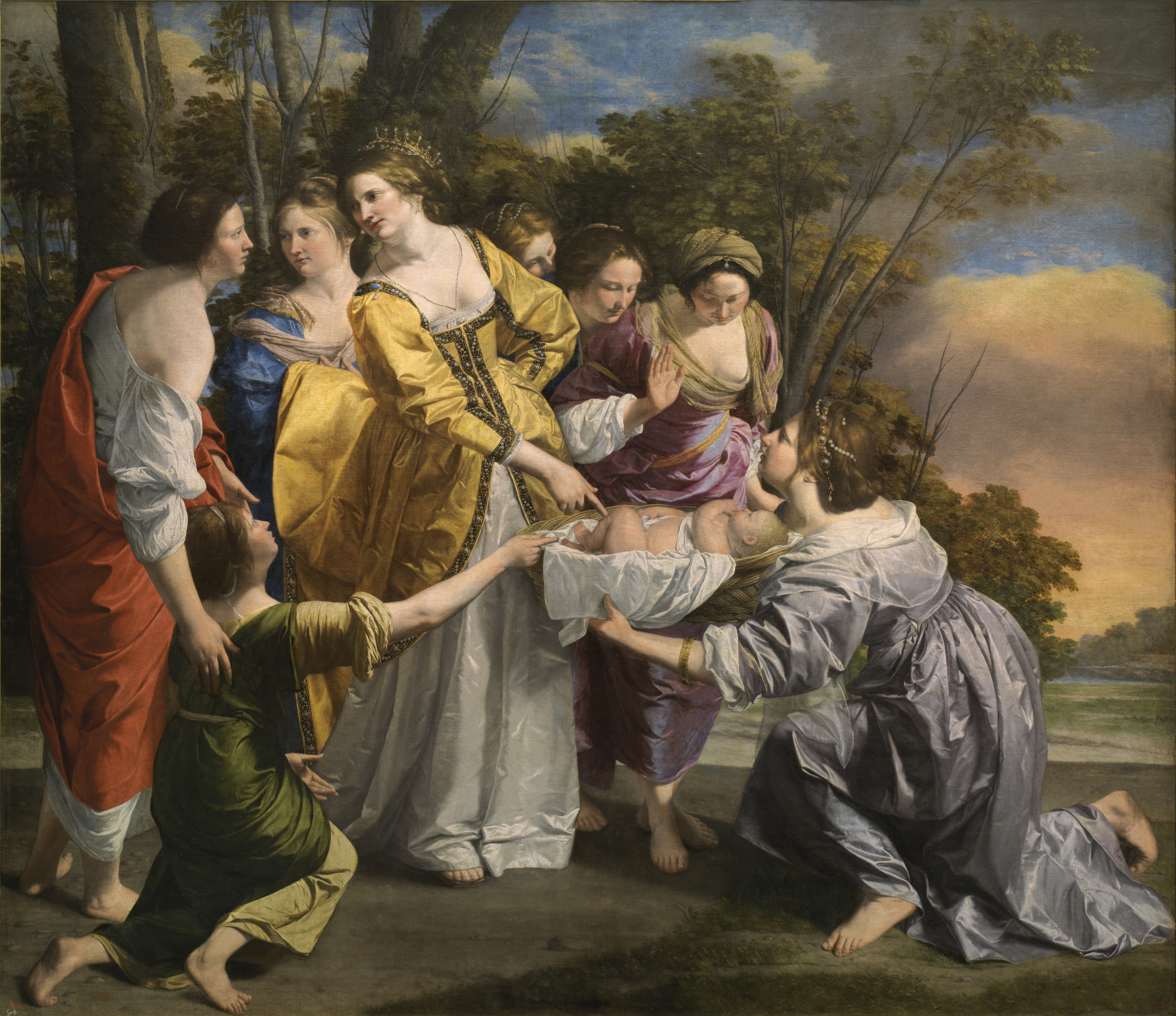
Orazio Gentileschi, Prado, 1633, one of two versions

== Biblical account ==
Chapter 1:15–22 of the Book of Exodus recounts how during the captivity in Egypt of the Jewish people, the Pharaoh ordered: "Every Hebrew boy that is born you must throw into the Nile, but let every girl live." Chapter 2 begins with the birth of Moses, and continues:

A certain member of the house of Levi went and took [into his household as his wife] a woman of Levi. The woman conceived and bore a son; and when she saw how beautiful he was, she hid him for three months. When she could hide him no longer, she got a wicker basket for him and caulked it with bitumen and pitch. She put the child into it and placed it among the reeds by the bank of the Nile. And his sister stationed herself at a distance, to learn what would befall him. The daughter of Pharaoh came down to bathe in the Nile, while her maidens walked along the Nile. She spied the basket among the reeds and sent her slave girl to fetch it. When she opened it, she saw that it was a child, a boy crying. She took pity on it and said, “This must be a Hebrew child.” Then his sister said to Pharaoh’s daughter, “Shall I go and get you a Hebrew nurse to suckle the child for you?” And Pharaoh’s daughter answered, “Yes.” So the girl went and called the child’s mother. And Pharaoh’s daughter said to her, “Take this child and nurse it for me, and I will pay your wages.” So the woman took the child and nursed it.

=== Visualizing the biblical account ===
The biblical account allows for a variety of compositions. There are different moments in the story, which are quite often compressed or combined in depictions, and the moment shown, and even the identity of the figures, is often unclear. In particular, Miriam and Moses's mother, traditionally given the name Jochabed, may be thought to be included in the group around the princess.

The Hebrew word usually translated as "basket" in verse 3 can also mean ark or small boat. The basket, usually with a rounded shape, is more common in Latin Christianity, and the ark more so in Jewish and Byzantine art; it is also used in Islamic miniatures. In all traditions, most depictions show a stretch of open river with few reeds. The vessel is sometimes seen drifting in many 19th-century depictions, and some in late medieval manuscripts of the Bible Moralisée type.

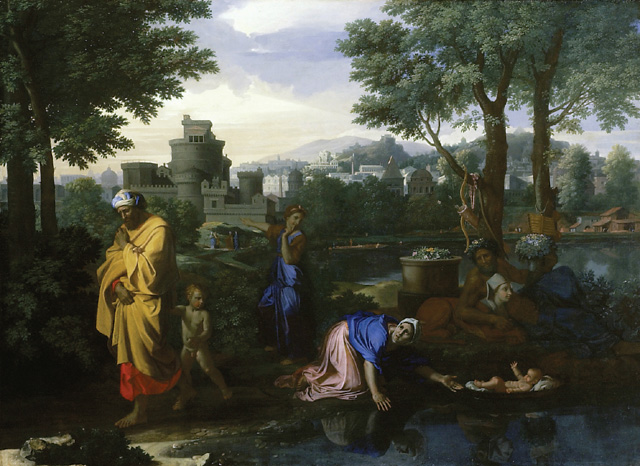
The Exposition of Moses, as his mother casts him off. The princess's party is further down the bank. Nicolas Poussin

The less common preceding scene of Moses being left in the reeds is formally called "The Exposition of Moses". In some depictions, this is shown in the distance as a subsidiary scene, and some books show both scenes. In some cases, it may be hard to distinguish between the two; usually, the "Exposition" includes Moses's mother and sister and sometimes his father and other figures.

Rivka Ulmer identifies recurrent "issues" in the iconography of the subject:

1. Is Moses in an ark or basket?
2. The type of hand gesture of Pharaoh's daughter;
3. Who enters the Nile to fetch Moses?
4. The number and the gender of the "handmaids";
5. What role, if any, is assigned to the River Nile?
6. The presence or absence of Egyptian artifacts.

== Christian art ==
=== Medieval ===
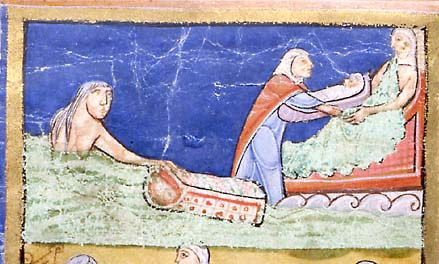
Detail of multi-scene miniature in the Eadwine Psalter, Canterbury, 1150s

Medieval depictions are sometimes found in illuminated manuscripts and other media. The incident was regarded as a typological precursor of the Annunciation, and sometimes paired with it. This probably accounts for it being represented as a faded fresco on the rear wall in the " Annunciation" by Jan van Eyck in the National Gallery of Art, Washington. It might also be regarded as prefiguring "the reception of Christ by the community of the faithful," the Resurrection of Jesus, and the escape from the Massacre of the Innocents by the Flight into Egypt. The princess was often seen allegorically as representing the Church, or earlier, the Gentile Church. Alternatively, Moses might be a type for Saint Peter, and so by extension the Pope or Papacy.

Cycles with the life of Moses were not common, but where they exist, they may be with this subject if they have more than four scenes. The fourth century Brescia Casket includes it among its 4 or 5 relief scenes from the Life of Moses, and there is thought to have been a depiction (now lost) in the mosaics of Santa Maria Maggiore. There is a 12th-century cycle in stained glass in the Basilica of Saint-Denis which includes it. Cycles are most often paired with one of the "Life of Christ", as later in the Sistine Chapel, where the scheme of paired cycles was intended to evoke the oldest Christian art. There are several short cycles in luxury manuscripts of the Bible Moralisée and related types, some of which give the story more than one image.

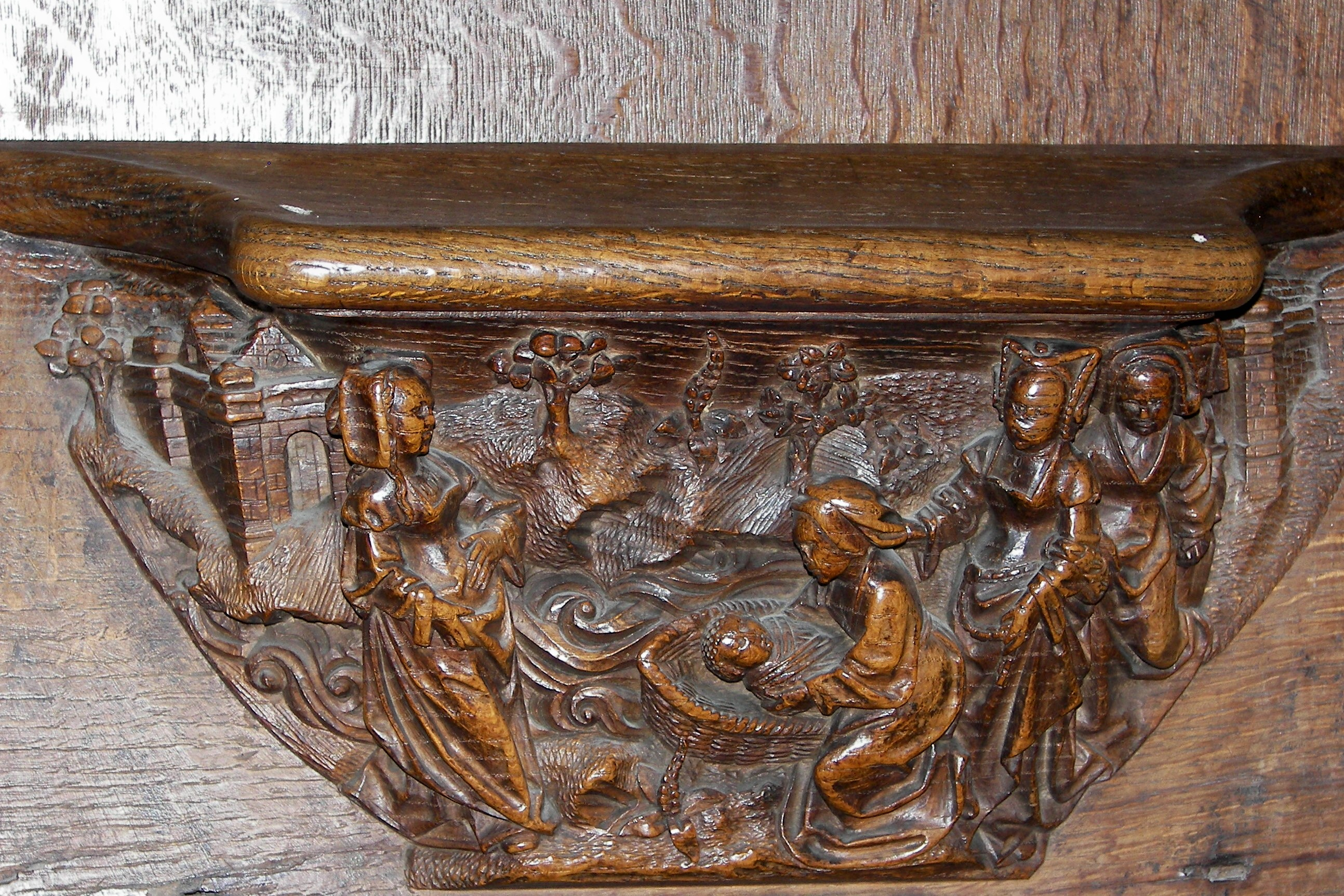
Gothic misericord, Amiens Cathedral

The depiction in the 12th-century English Eadwine Psalter has a naked female swimmer in the water, holding the empty ark with one hand, while a clothed female with her feet in the water holds out the baby to the princess, who reclines on a bed or litter. This is part of some 11 scenes of the life of Moses. This may relate to the Jewish visual traditions covered below.

The artist of a French Romanesque capital has enjoyed himself showing the infant Moses threatened by crocodiles and perhaps hippos, as often shown in classical depictions of the Nile landscape. This sporadic treatment anticipates modern Biblical criticism: "The cameo of the birth of Moses does not fit the reality of the Nile, where crocodiles would make it dangerous to send a babe in a basket onto the water or even to bathe by the shore: even if the poor were forced to take the risk, no princess would."

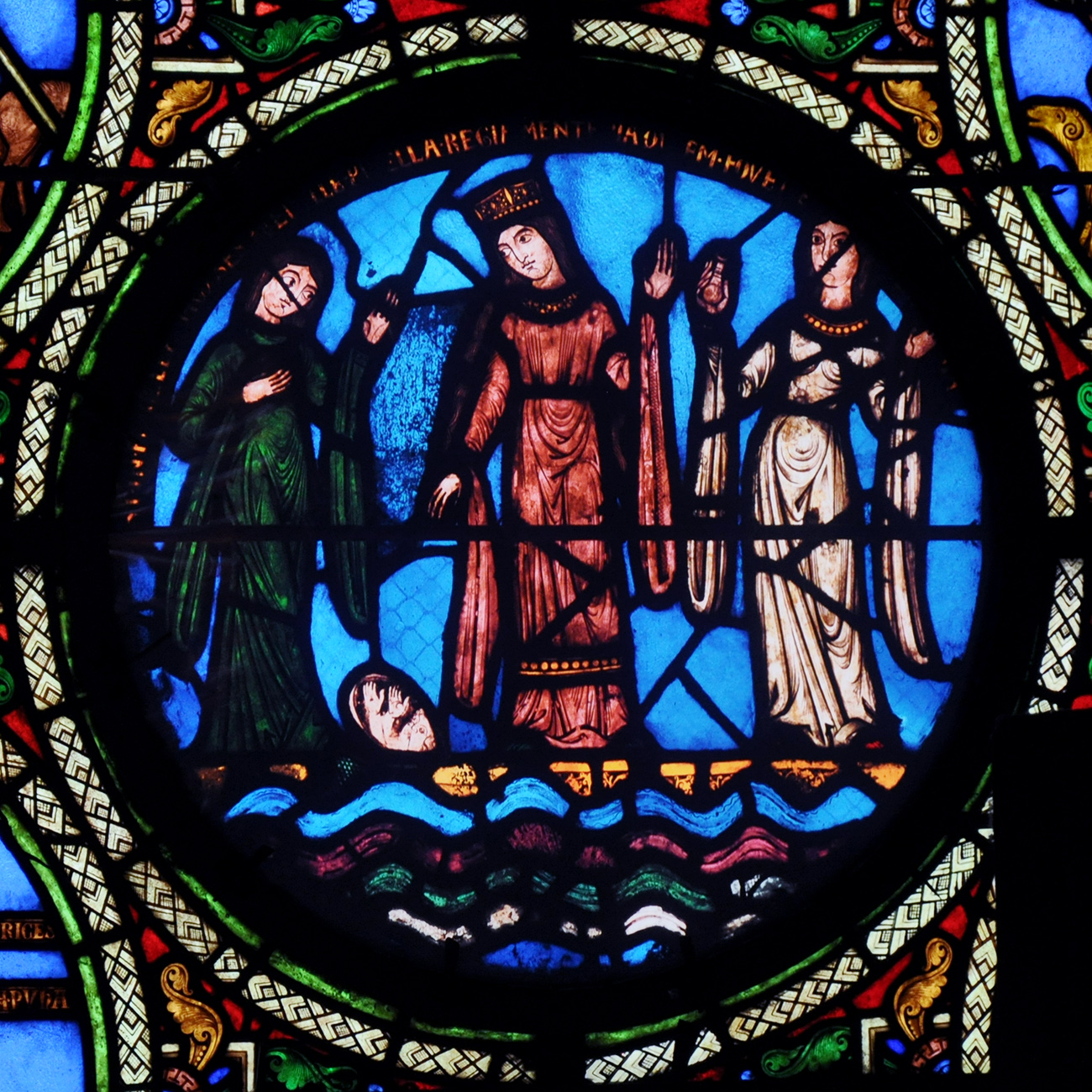
12th-century glass, Saint-Denis

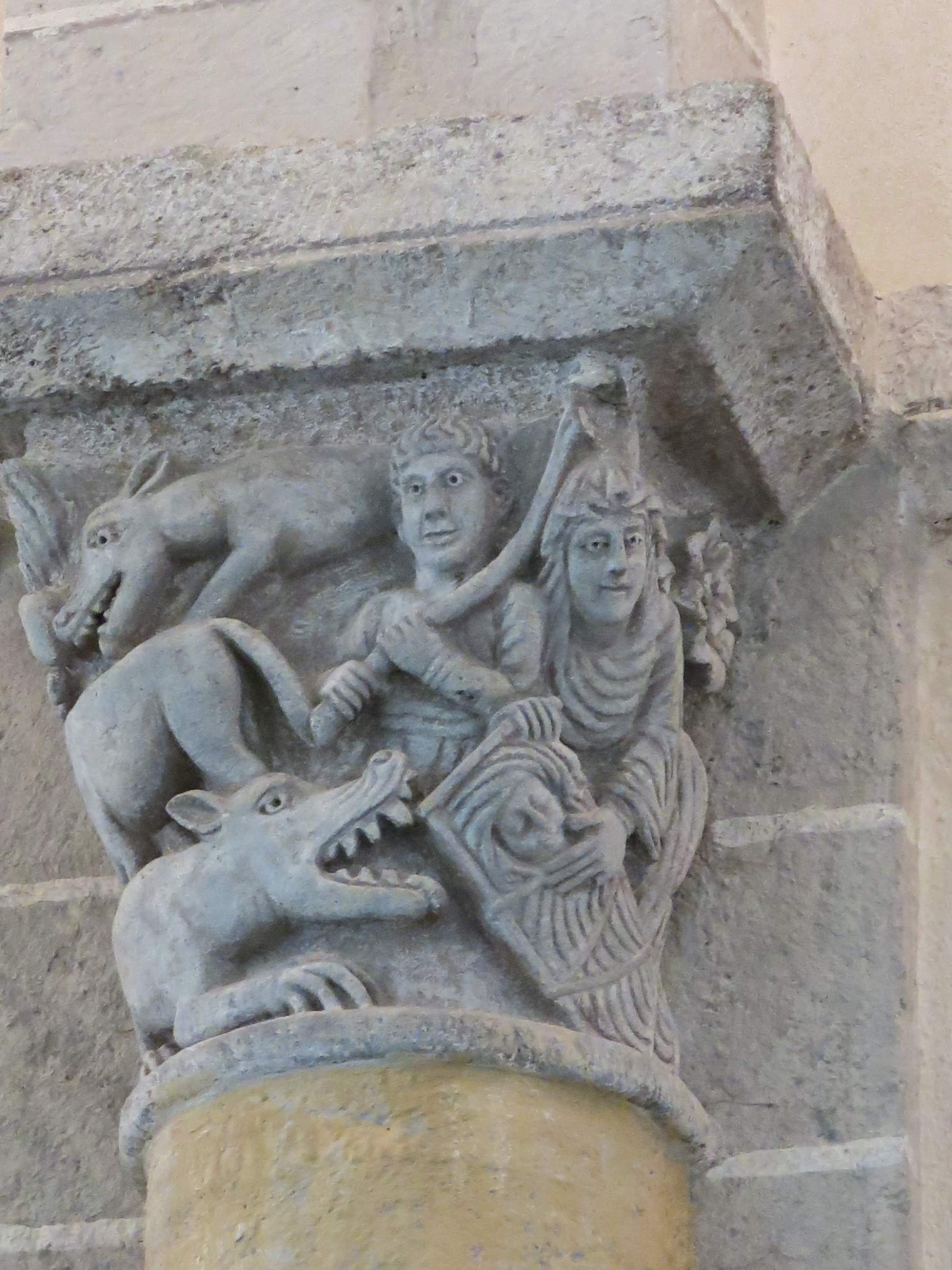
French Romanesque capital, aware of the classical tradition of the Nilotic landscape

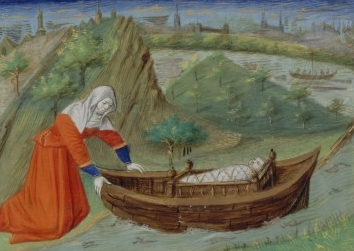
Moses being "exposed," very much in an "ark," 15th-century miniature

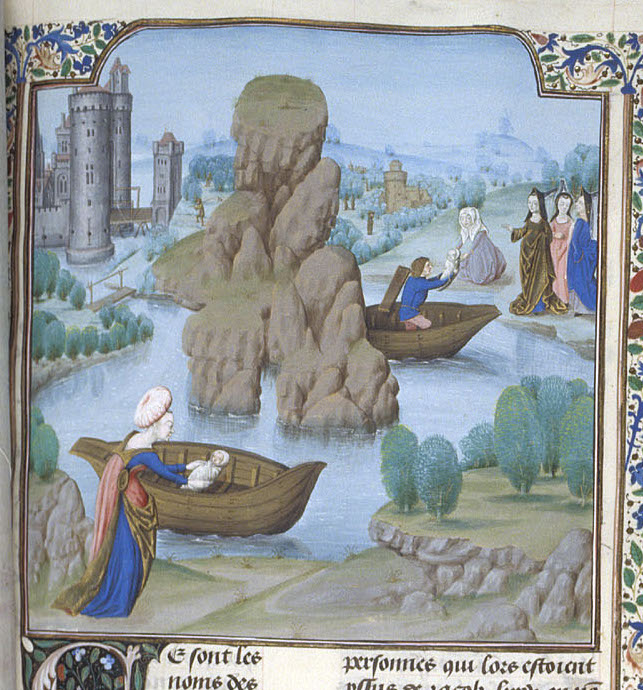
The casting-off in the foreground, combined with the finding at rear, 15th-century.

=== Renaissance onwards ===
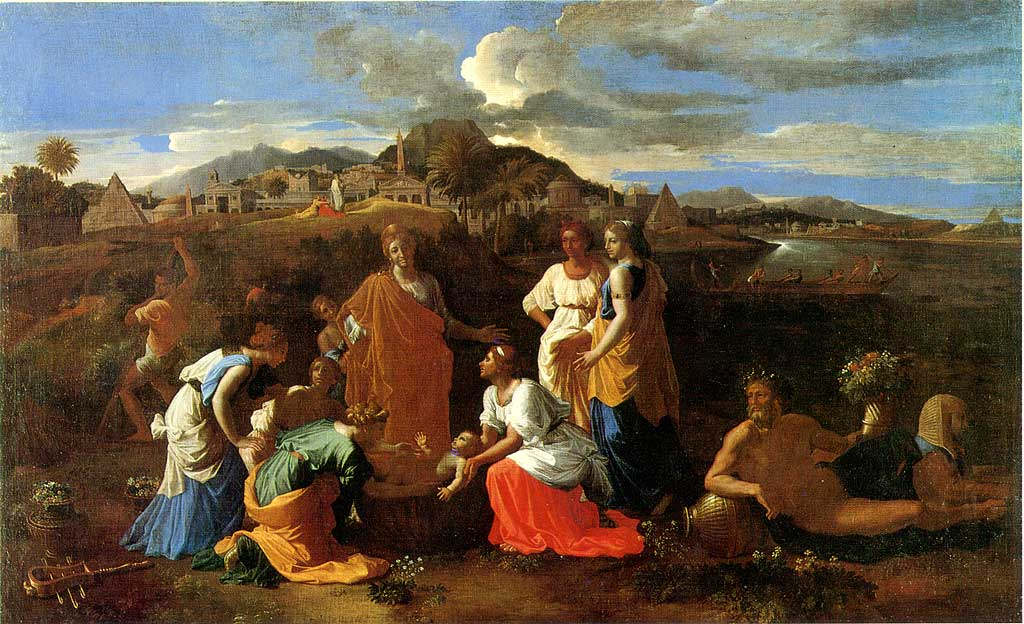
Nicolas Poussin, 1647 (the "Pointel" version), Louvre. Men hunt hippos from a boat behind.

The walls of the Sistine Chapel had facing paired cycles of the lives of Christ and Moses in large frescos, and a "Finding" by Pietro Perugino began the Moses sequence on the altar wall until it was destroyed in the 1530s to make space for The Last Judgment by Michelangelo, along with a "Nativity of Jesus". Perugino's Moses Leaving for Egypt now begins the cycle.

Independent pictures of the subject became increasingly popular in the Renaissance and Baroque periods, when the combination of several elegantly dressed and graceful ladies with a waterside landscape or classical architectural background made it attractive to artists and patrons. For Venice the story had a particular resonance with the early history of the city. These paintings were for homes and palaces, sometimes for foundling hospitals.

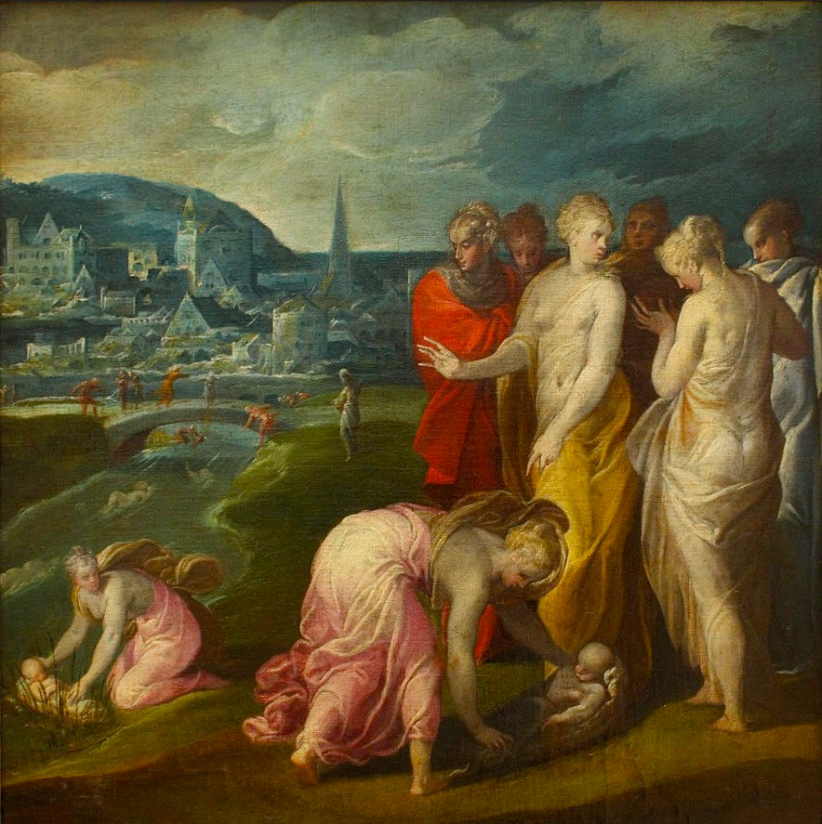
Niccolò dell'Abbate, c. 1570, Louvre

In addition, child abandonment remained a significant social issue in the period, with foundling hospitals, orphanages specifically for abandoned children, a common focus of charitable activity by the rich. The seal of the London Foundling Hospital showed the scene. The artist Francis Hayman gave them his painting of the subject, where it hung next to William Hogarth's painting of a slightly later episode of the young Moses and the princess. A depiction by Charles de La Fosse was one of a pair of biblical subjects commissioned in 1701 for the billiards room at the Palace of Versailles, paired with "Eliezer and Rebecca"; possibly the idea was to encourage those winning bets on the game to give their winnings to charity.

The 17th century saw the height of popularity for the subject, with Poussin painting it at least three times, as well as several versions of "The Exposition of Moses". It has been suggested that the birth in 1638 of the future Louis XIV, whose parents had been childless for 23 years, may have been a factor in the interest of French artists. The poet Antoine Girard de Saint-Amant wrote an epic poem, "Moyse sauvé" between about 1638 and 1653.

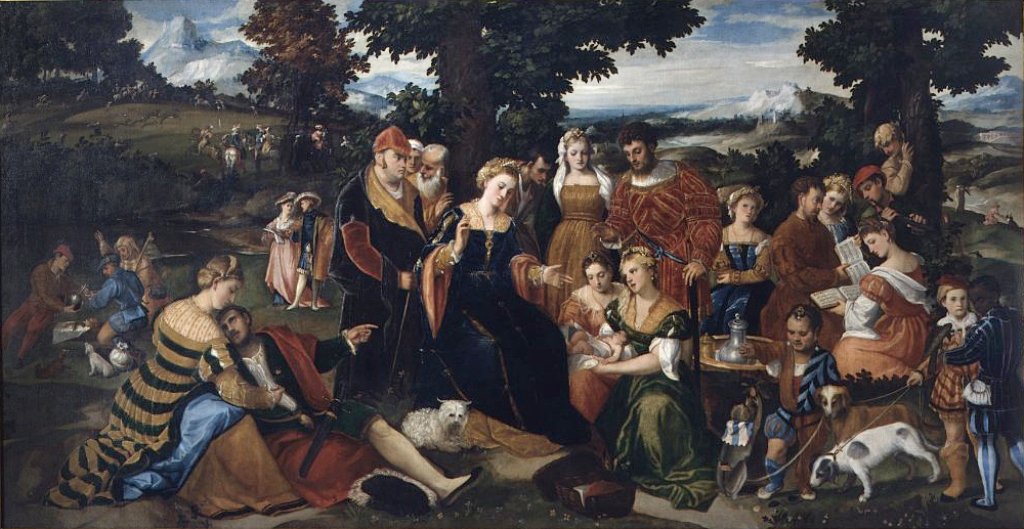
Bonifazio de' Pitati, 1545, Brera, Milan, 175 × 345 cm

As well as the Catholic countries, there were also several versions in Dutch Golden Age painting, where the Old Testament subject was considered unobjectionable, orphanages were run by boards of "regents" drawn from the local wealthy, and the story of Moses was also given contemporary political significance. A painting of the subject shown on the wall behind "The Astronomer" by Vermeer may represent knowledge and science, as Moses was "learned in all the wisdom of the Egyptians."

A painting by Bonifazio de' Pitati of 1545 was perhaps the first large and elaborate treatment of the subject to concentrate on a larger courtly group, entirely using carefully depicted contemporary costumes; he painted at least one smaller similar version of the subject. Bonifazio painted a number of biblical subjects as "modern aristocratic reality", which was already an established pictorial mode in Venice. This is essentially a large aristocratic picnic, complete with musicians, dwarves, many dogs and a monkey, and strolling lovers, where the baby represents an object of polite curiosity. A Niccolò dell'Abbate from c. 1570, now in the Louvre, represents a more classical treatment, with the same "classical" costumes and atmosphere as his mythological subjects. This is closely followed by several compositions by Veronese, using the modern dress of his day.

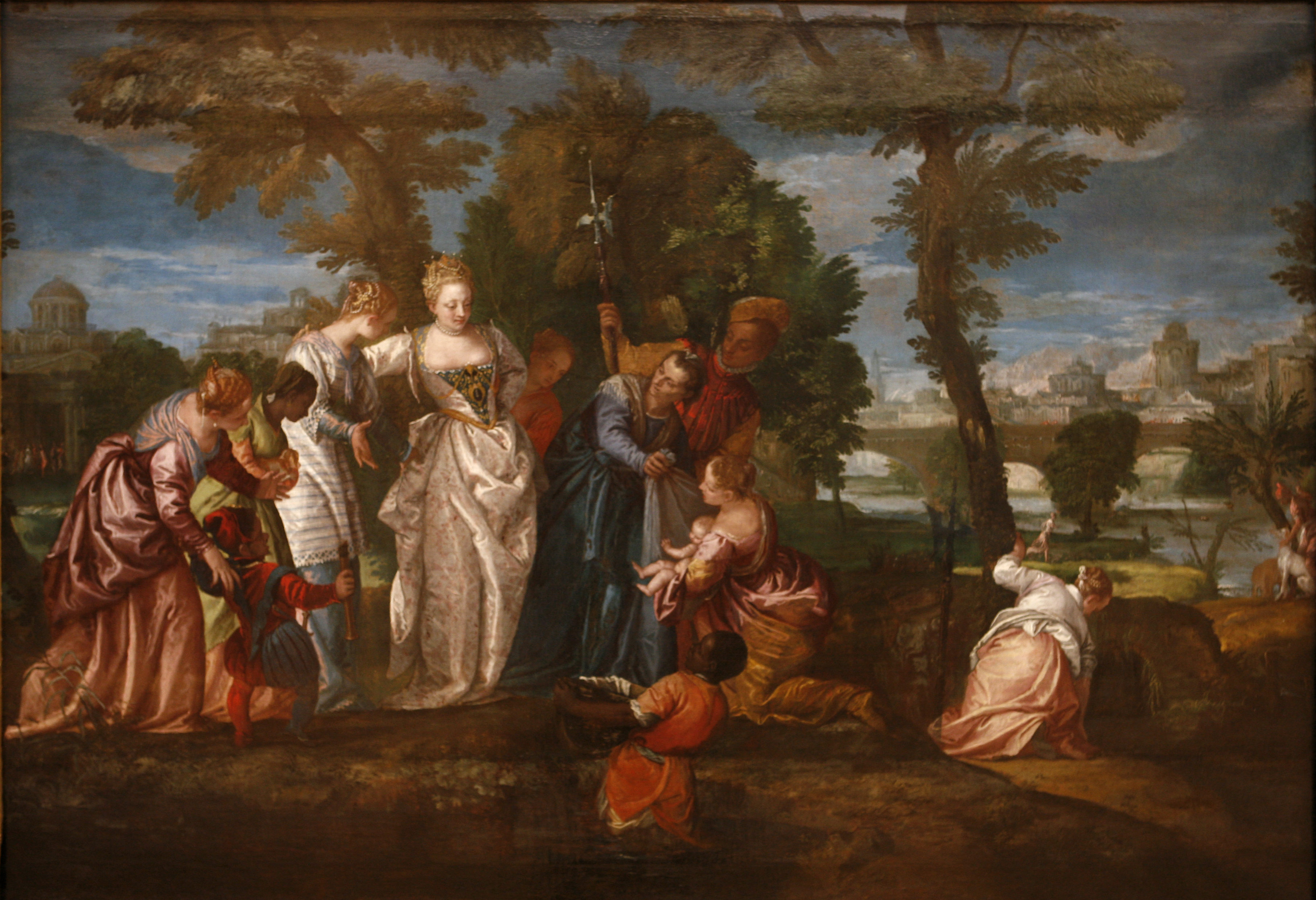
One of several treatments by Veronese, 1580s, Dijon.

The paintings of Veronese and others, especially Venetians, offered some of the attractions of subjects from pagan mythology but with a subject with a Christian context. Veronese had been called before the Inquisition in 1573 for the improper depiction of the Last Supper as an extravagant festivity mainly in modern dress, which he renamed "The Feast in the House of Levi." Since the "Finding" indeed called for a party of lavishly dressed court ladies and their attendants, it avoided such objections.

Veronese's costumes, contemporary when he painted them in the 1570s and 580s, became established as a sort of standard, and wseveraland repeated in new compositions by a umber of Venetian painters in the 18th century, during a "Veronese revival." The famous painting by Giovanni Battista Tiepolo in the National Gallery of Scotland dates from the 1730s or 1740s, but avoids the fashion of that period and bases its costumes on a Veronese now in Dresden, but in Venice until 1747; another Tiepolo now in the National Gallery of Victoria uses the style of Veronese even more thoroughly.

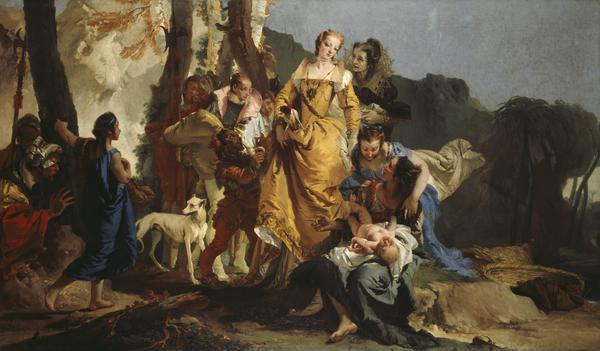
Giovanni Battista Tiepolo, National Gallery of Scotland, probably 1730s, now 202 × 342 cm

Nicolas Poussin was attracted both to subjects from the life of Moses and history subjects with an Egyptian setting. His figures wore the 17th-century idea of ancient dress, and the cityscapes in the distant background include pyramids and obelisks, where previously most artists, for example, Veronese, had not attempted to represent a specifically Egyptian setting. An exception is NiccolincludesAbbate, whose broadly painted cityscape include several prominent triangular elements, although some might be gable-ends. Palm trees are also sometimes seen; European artists, even in the north, had been used to depicting these from painting the "Miracle of the Palm" on the Flight into Egypt in particular.

For good measure the main three versions by Poussin all include a Roman-style Nilus, the god or personification of the Nile, reclining with a cornucopia, in two of them in company with a sphinx, which follows a specific classical statue in the Vatican. His 1647 version for the banker Pointel (now Louvre) includes a hippopotamus hunt on the river in the background, adapted from the Roman Nile mosaic of Palestrina. In a discussion at the Académie royale de peinture et de sculpture in 1688, the painting was criticised for two breaches of artistic decorum: the princess' skin was too dark, and the pagan god was inappropriate in a biblical subject. Both details were corrected in a version in tapestry, though the sphinx survived. Poussin's treatments show awareness of much of the scholarly interest in Moses in terms of what we now call comparative religion.

After that, attempts at an authentic Egyptian setting were irregular until the start of the 19th century, with the advent of modern Egyptology, and in art, the development of Orientalism. By the late 19th century, exotic decor was often dominant, and several depictions concentrated on the ladies of the court, naked but for carefully researched jewellery. The reed beds in the Bible are often given prominence. The extensive history of the scene in the cinema began in 1905, the year after Sir Lawrence Alma-Tadema finished his painting, with the "Finding" the opening scene in a 5-minute biographical film by the French company Pathé.

Orientalist depictions

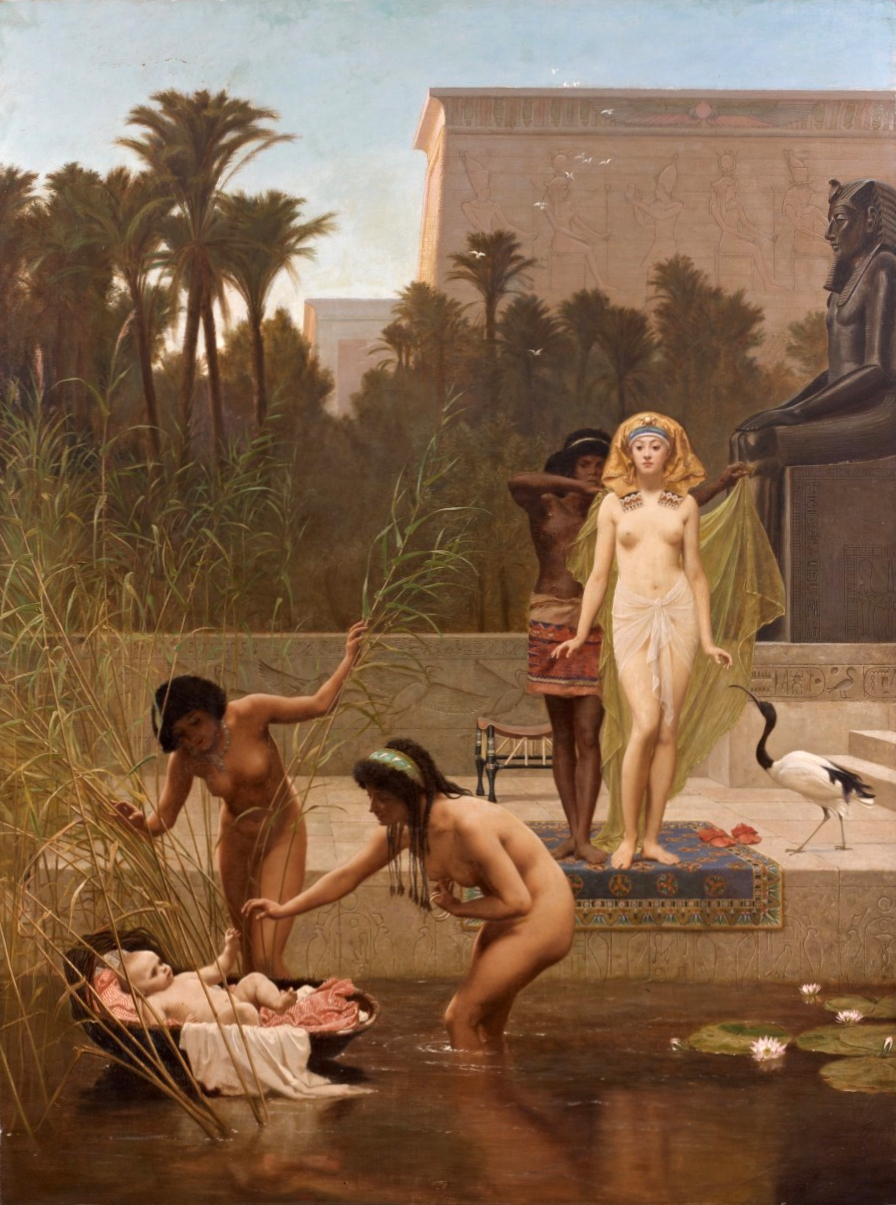
The Finding of Moses by Frederick Goodall, 1885

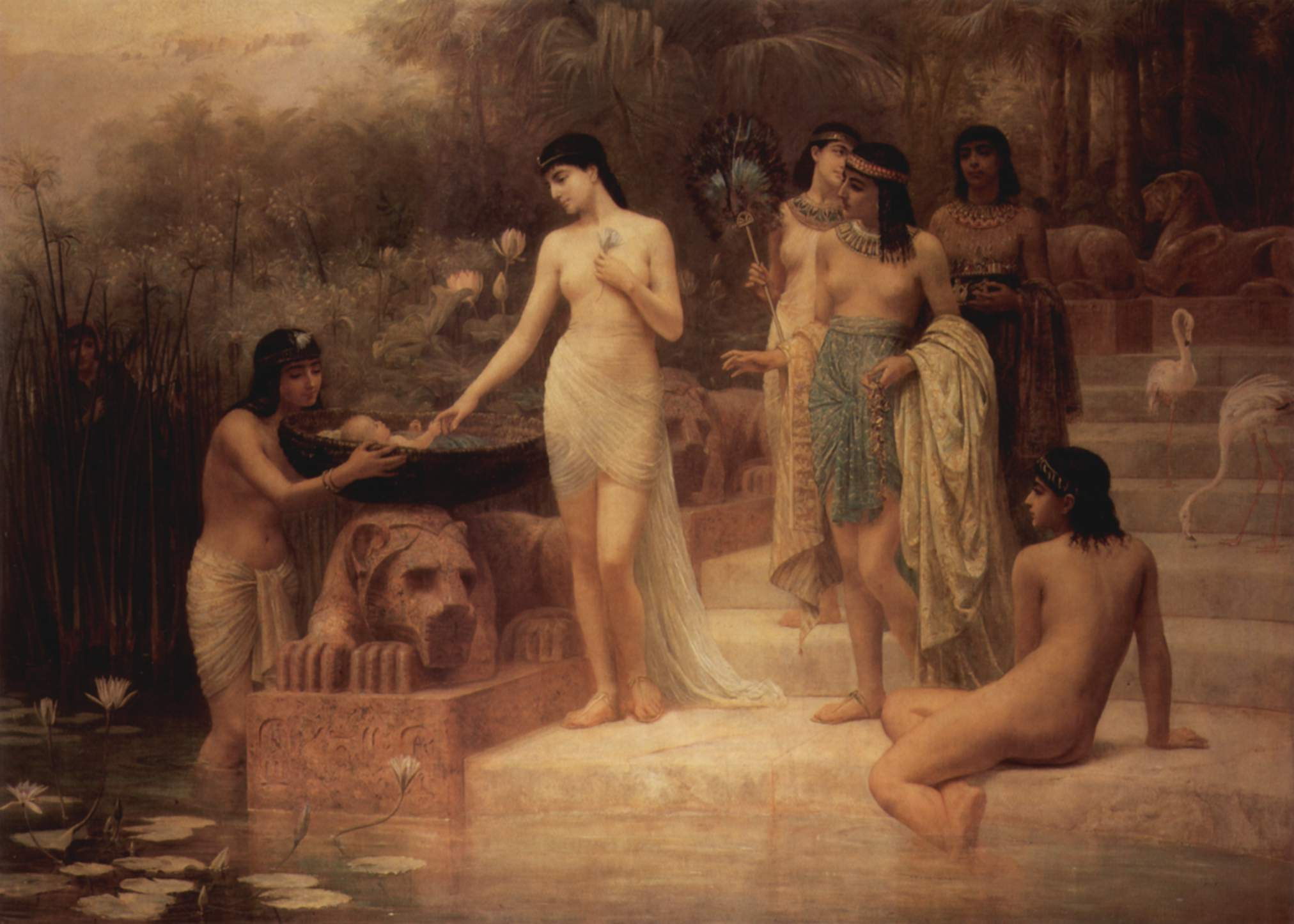
Edwin Long, 1886

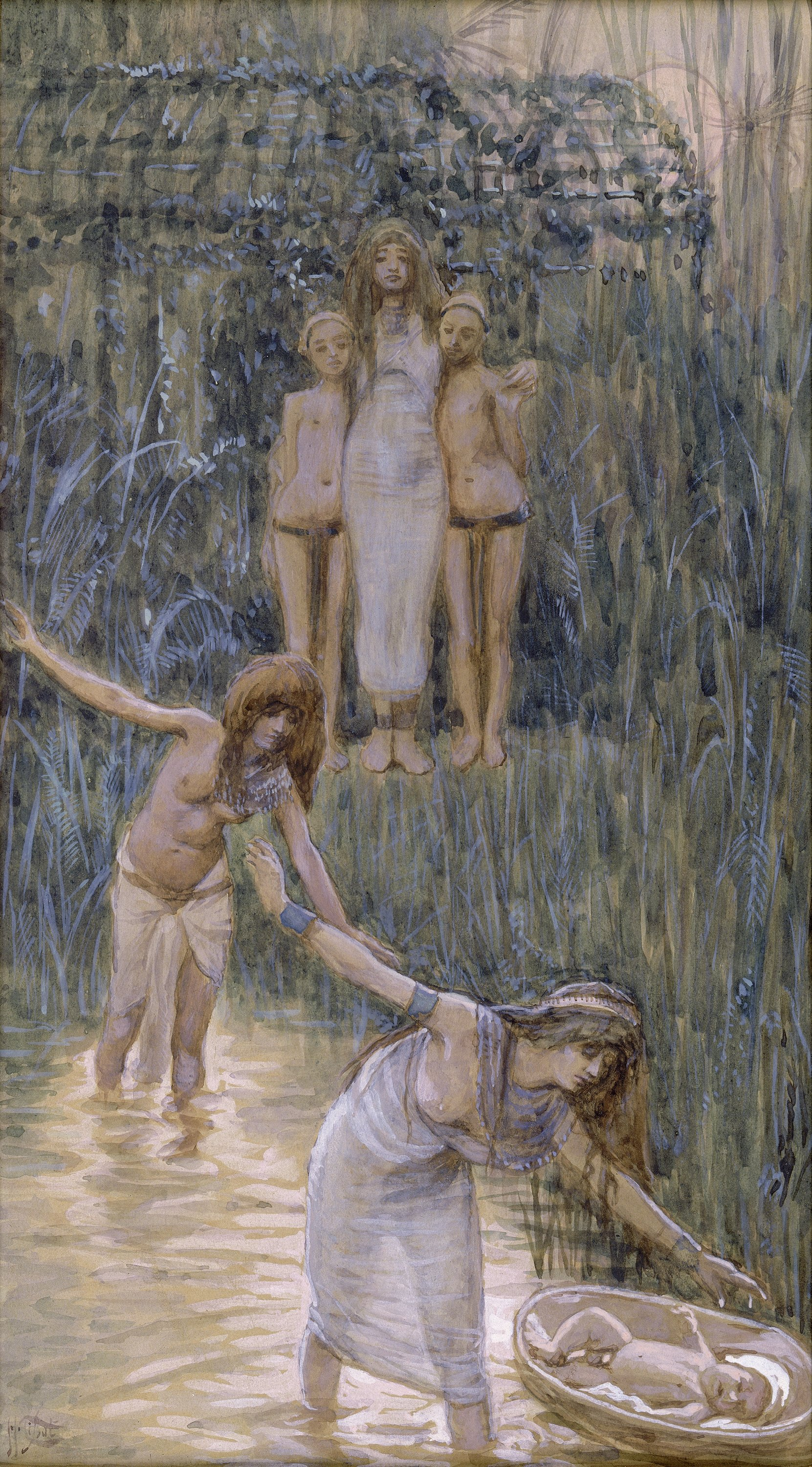
James Tissot, 1896–1902, gouache

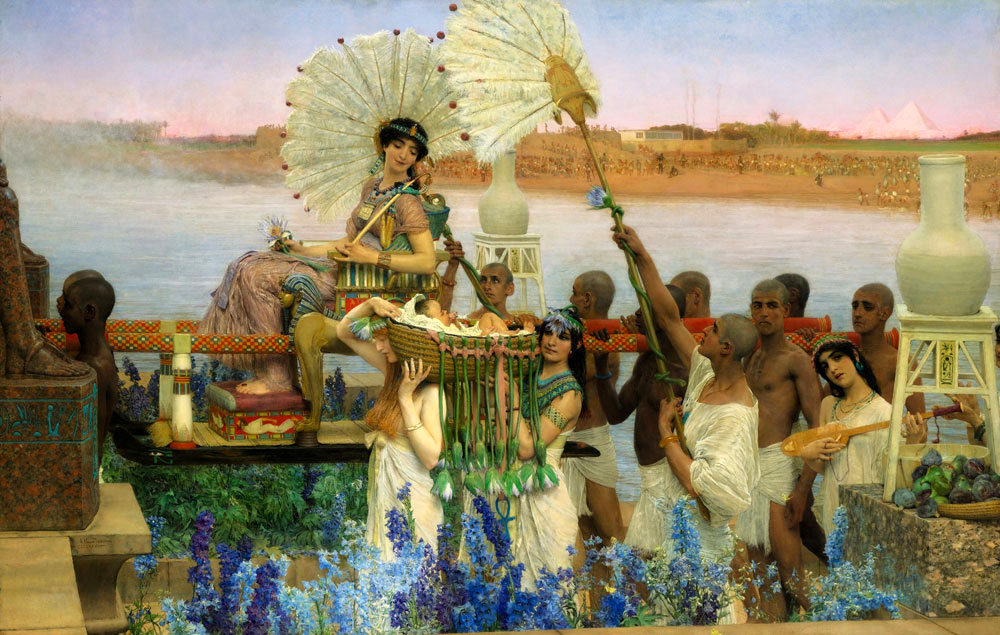
The Finding of Moses by Lawrence Alma-Tadema, 1904

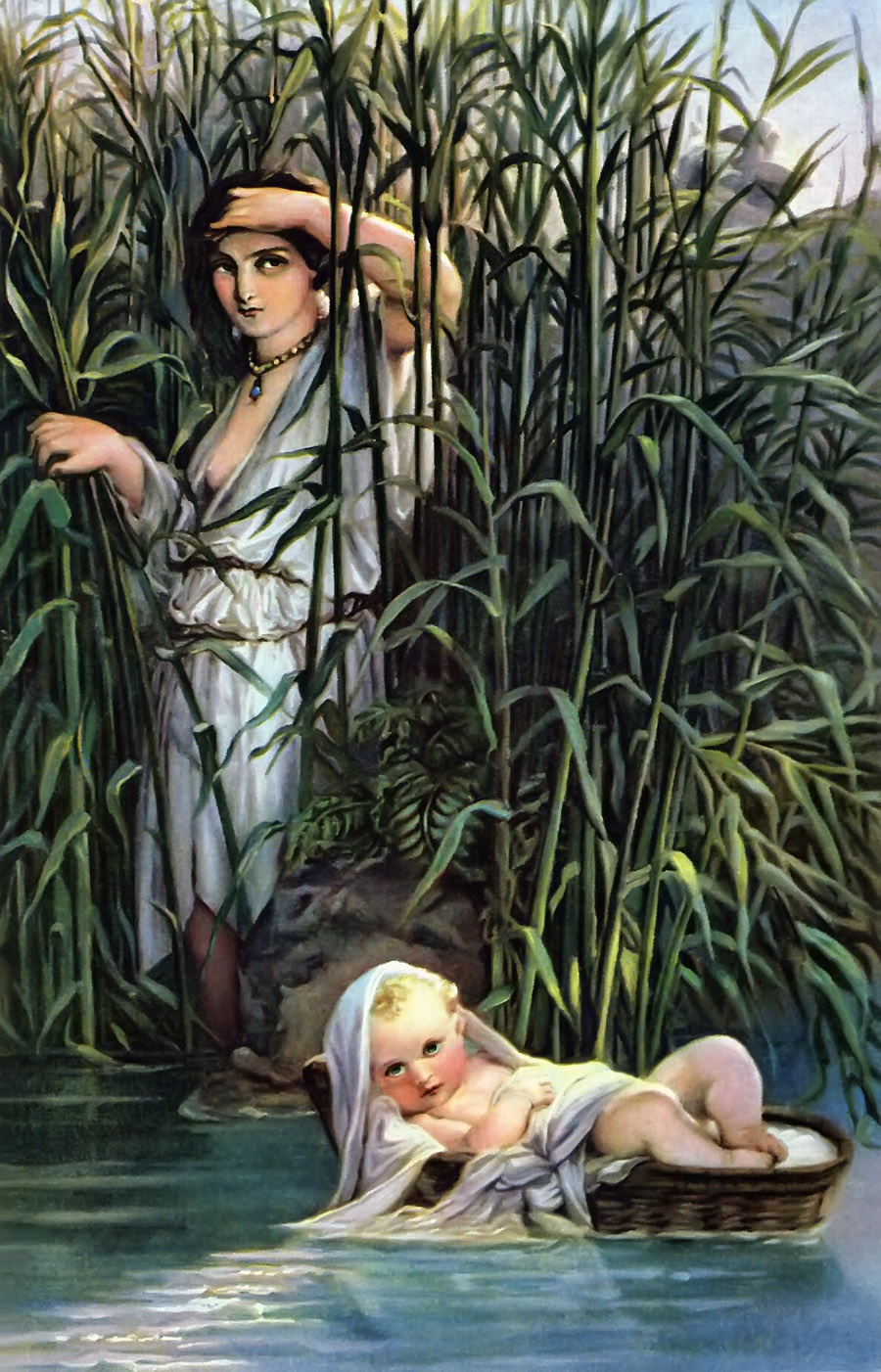
A painting by Paul Delaroche, before 1857, was much reproduced in prints and book illustrations

== Jewish art and traditions ==
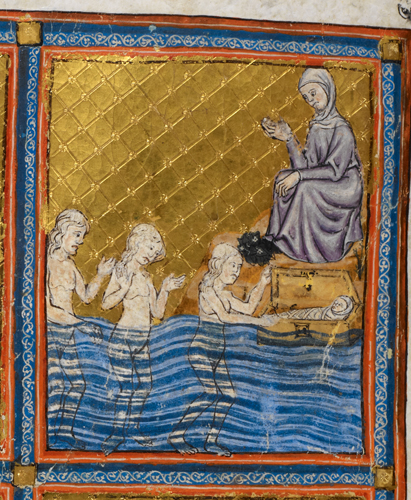
From the Golden Haggadah, Catalonia, c. 1320

The earliest visual depiction of the "Finding" is a fresco in the Dura-Europos synagogue, datable to around 244, a unique large-scale survival of what may have been a large body of figurative Jewish religious art in the Hellenized Roman imperial period. This part of a composite image shows several episodes from the childhood of Moses (only the left end illustrated here). It displays both Midrashic details in the narrative and visual borrowings from the iconography of classical paganism. Six of the 26 frescos in the synagogue have Moses as their main subject. There are a few illustrations in mainly medieval Jewish illuminated manuscripts, mostly of the Haggadah, some of which seem to share an iconographical tradition going back to late antiquity.

Jewish textual traditions elaborate on the Book of Exodus in various ways, and it has been argued that some details can be detected in Christian art as well. One Jewish tradition was that Pharaoh's daughter was identified as Bithiah, a leper who was bathing in the river to cleanse herself, seen as a ritual purification for which she would be naked. As at Dura-Europos, Jewish depictions often include her, and sometimes other women, standing naked in the river. According to Rabbinic tradition, she was healed as soon as she touched the ark carrying Moses.

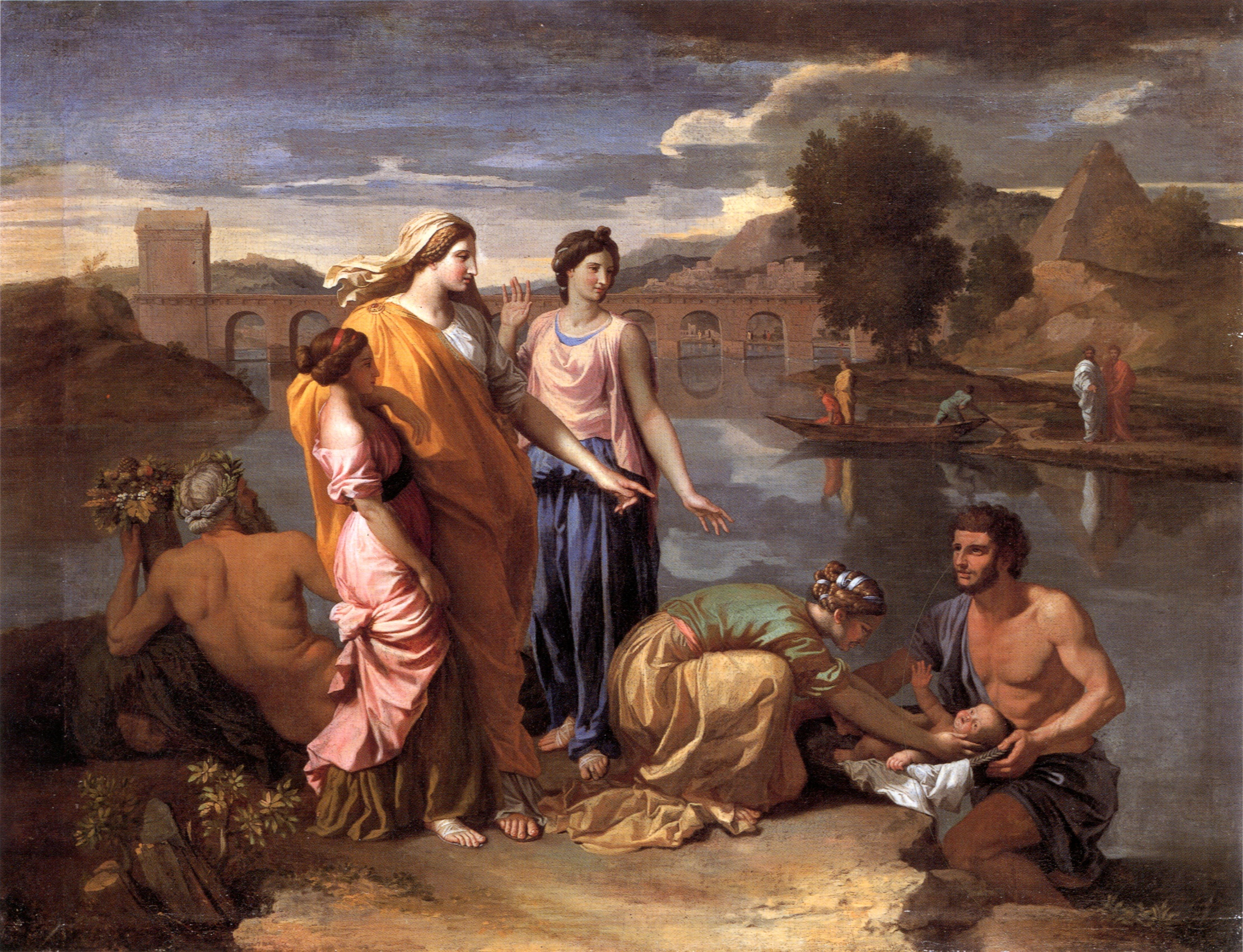
Poussin, 1638, Louvre, with the male "swimmer" from Josephus, and a personification of the Nile at left.

The earliest surviving Christian depiction is a fresco of the 4th century in the Catacomb of Via Latina, Rome. Four figures are on the bank, with Moses still in the water; the largest is the princess, who stretches out her arms, which the baby also does. This gesture may derive from a textual variation found in Midrashic sources and the Aramaic translation of the Bible. In these "she ... sent her female slave" is changed to "she stretched out her arm." Though the context is Christian, many of the images here are of Old Testament subjects, and very likely reflect models adopted from an initially Jewish visual tradition, perhaps painted by artisans with sets of models for all religious requirements. In the play Exagōge by Ezekiel the Tragedian, Moses recounts his finding, saying of the princess: "And straightway seeing me, she took me up", which may be reflected both in the New Testament in Acts 7:20, and in artistic depictions where the princess is first to grasp the ark.

The motif of the naked princess standing in the water, sometimes accompanied by naked maids, reappears in Jewish manuscript illuminations from Spanish workshops in the late Middle Ages, along with some other details of iconography found in the Dura-Europos synagogue. In the 14th-century Golden Haggadah there are three, while Moses's sister Miriam sits on the bank watching them. Other works include the so-called "Sister of the Golden Haggadah" manuscript, and the (Christian) Pamplona Bibles. By contrast, the 18th-century Venice Haggadah has been influenced by local Christian depictions, and shows a clothed princess on land.

A different tradition is first found in Josephus, who was read by Poussin and influenced his treatment of this and other biblical scenes. His account of the finding has the princess "playing by the river bank" and spotting Moses being "borne down the stream". She "sent off some swimmers" to fetch him. Thus in Poussin's 1638 "Finding" in the Louvre a burly male emerges from the water with the child and basket, a detail sometimes copied by other painters. This is followed in Sebastian Bourdon's painting of 1650, with two male swimmers. Italian paintings more often show female swimmers or at least women who have landed and are drying themselves after handing the baby to the princess, as in Sebastiano Ricci, Salvator Rosa, Giovanni Francesco Romanelli, as well as a painting in the Rijksmuseum by Paulus Bor and Cornelis Vroom from the 1630s, and Poussin's 1651 composition. The only painting of the subject from Rembrandt 's studio shows several naked women who have just come out of the water, bringing the basket.

== Islamic art ==
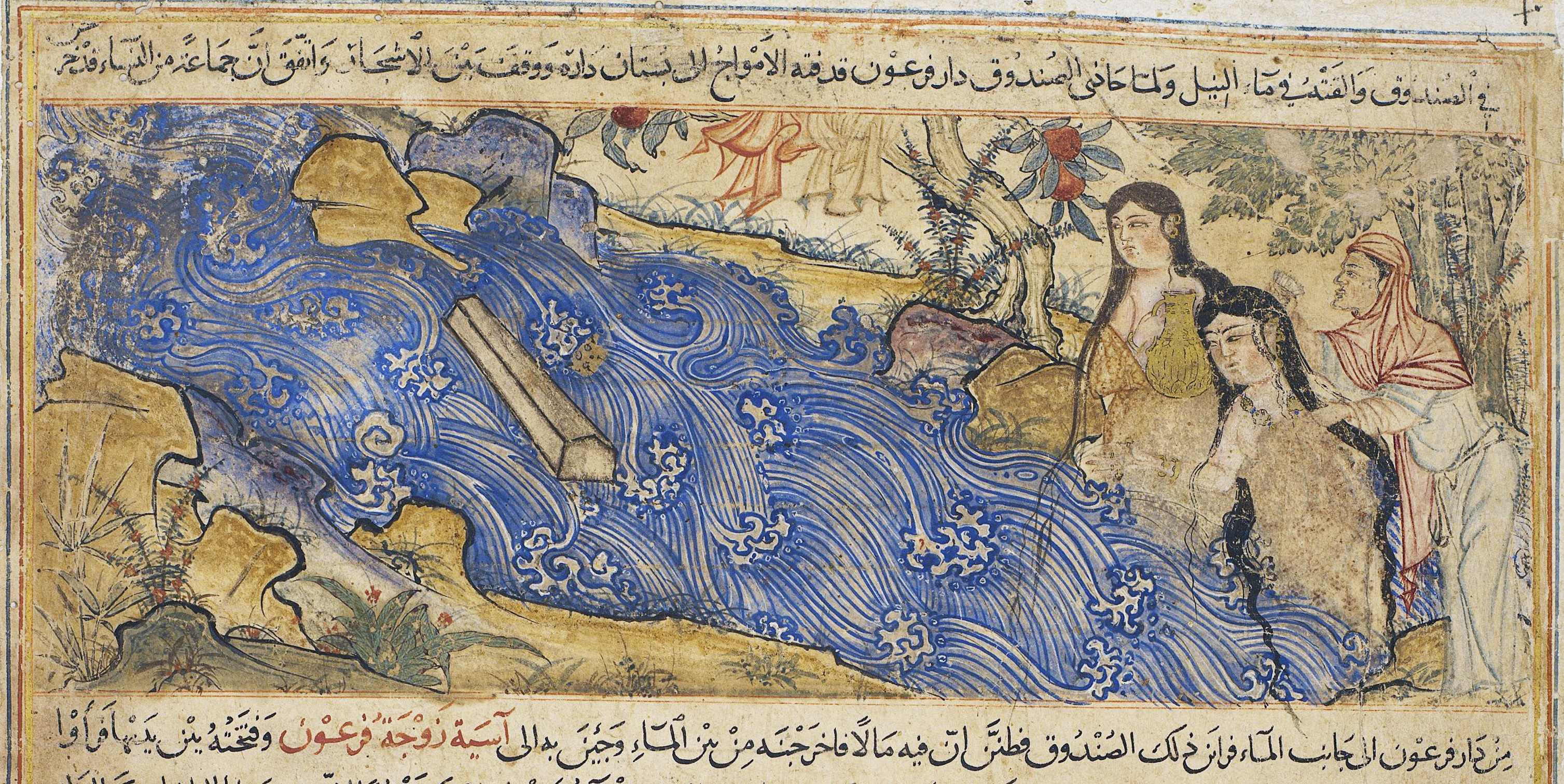
Jami' al-tawarikh, c. 1310, Edinburgh

There is an unusual depiction in the Edinburgh University Library manuscript of the Jami' al-tawarikh, an ambitious world history written in the Ilkhanate, now Iran, at the start of the 14th century. In the Qur'an and Islamic tradition, it is Pharaoh's wife Asiya who rescues the baby, not his daughter. Here, the baby Moses remains in his ark, which is carried along a river with curling Chinese-style waves towards the women.

The queen is in the river with an attendant, both at least clothed in undergarments (more clothes seem to be hanging from a tree branch), and an older servant, or Moses's mother, on the bank. The ark appears enclosed and solid; it looks like an elongated coffin, perhaps because the artist was unfamiliar with the subject. There are few comparable Islamic world histories, and like other scenes in the Jami' al-tawarikh, this may be all but unique in Islamic miniatures. The composition may be derived from Byzantine depictions.

This manuscript has seven miniatures of the life of Moses, an unprecedented number perhaps suggesting a unique identification with Moses by the author Rashid-al-Din Hamadani, a convert from Judaism who became chief minister of the Ilkhanate.

== Leading depictions ==
- The Finding of Moses by Gianbattista Tiepolo, in Edinburgh; a different composition in Melbourne.
- The Finding of Moses by Orazio Gentileschi, versions in the Prado, Madrid and National Gallery, London
- The Finding of Moses by Nicolas Poussin; there are three different compositions, two in the Louvre, Paris, the other National Gallery, London
- The Finding of Moses by Paolo Veronese, various compositions, in the Prado, Dresden, Dijon and elsewhere
- The Finding of Moses by Lawrence Alma-Tadema, 1904, sold at auction in 2010 for nearly US$36 million. Private collection.

== Comparative ==
Zalpuwa is the setting for an ancient legend about the Queen of Kanesh, which was either composed in or translated into the Hittite language:

"[The Queen] of Kanesh once bore thirty sons in a single year. She said: 'What a horde is this which I have born[e]!' She caulked(?) baskets with fat, put her sons in them, and launched them in the river. The river carried them down to the sea at the land of Zalpuwa. Then the gods took them up out of the sea and reared them. When some years had passed, the queen again gave birth, this time to thirty daughters. This time she herself reared them."

== See also ==
- "The Finding of Moses" (poem), a poem by the Irish street poet Zozimus (b. circa 1794 – d. 1846)
