= Cobert =

Cobert is a surname. Notable people with the name include:

- Beth Cobert, American businesswoman, government official
- Bob Cobert (1924–2020), American composer for TV and films
- Harold Cobert, French writer
- Jon Cobert, American pianist, musician, composer

== See also ==
- City of Gotha and Federal Republic of Germany v Sotheby's and Cobert Finance S.A., a September 1998 case in the High Court of England and Wales involving the ownership of a Joachim Wtewael painting
