= Peter Wtewael =

Dutch painter

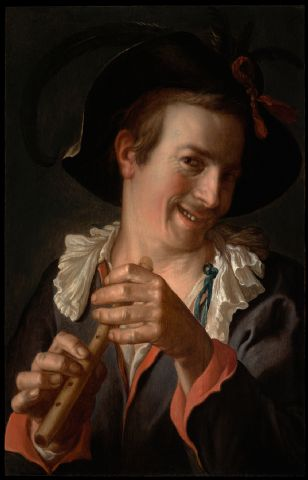
Peter Wtewael, A Jester Holding a Flute, 1623

Peter Wtewael (5 June 1596 – 16 January 1660) was a Dutch Golden Age painter.

== Biography ==
Wtewael was born in Utrecht, son of the Dutch painter and engraver Joachim Wtewael and brother to the painter Johan Wtewael. According to the RKD he is known as a follower of Caravaggio. He specialized in painting kitchen scenes and mythological figures. Wtewael died in 1660. One of his works is displayed at the Metropolitan Museum of Art.
