= Joachim Wtewael =

Dutch painter and draughtsman (1566–1638)

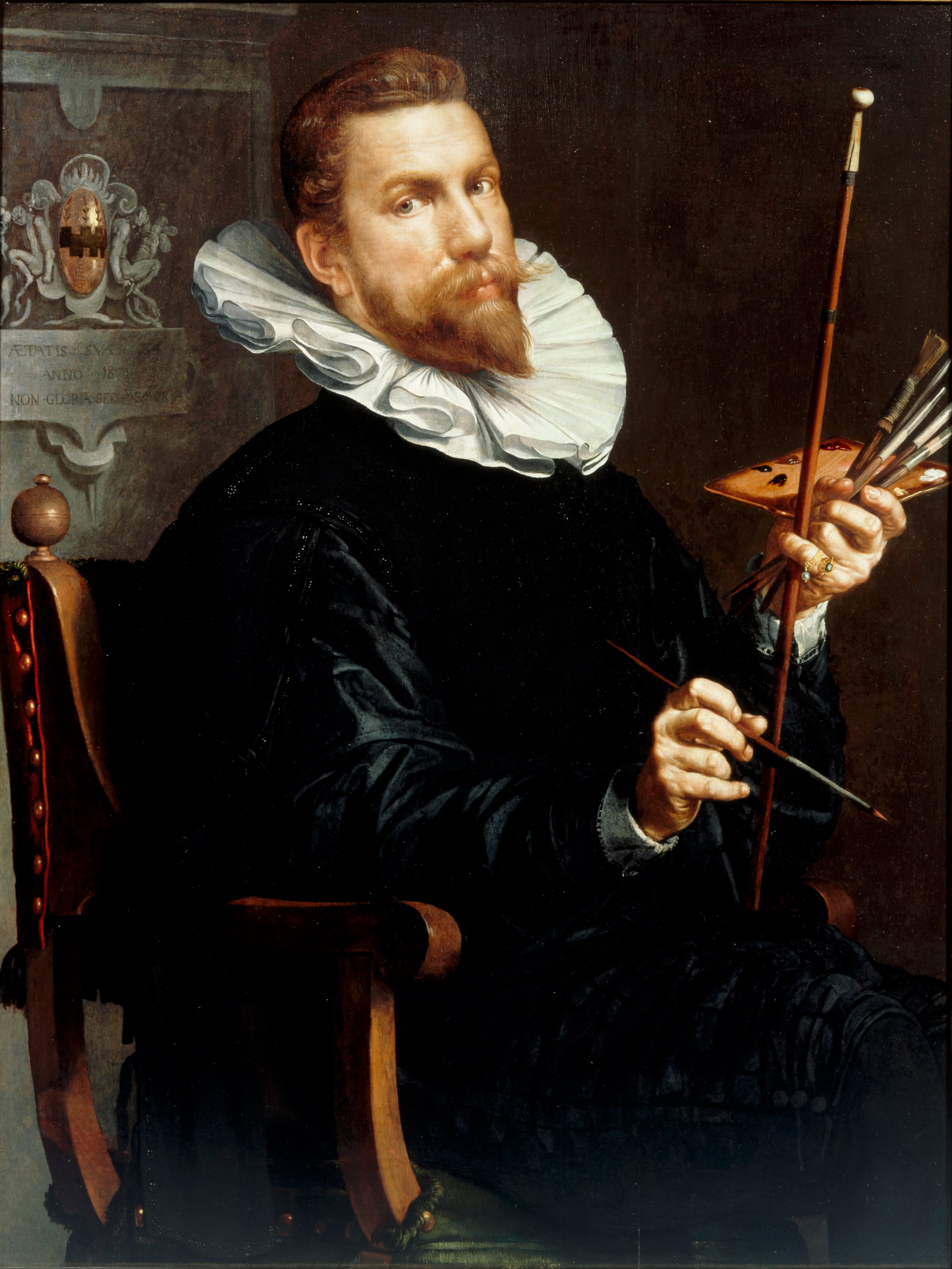
- Self-portrait, 1601
- Born: Joachim Anthoniszoon Wtewael; 1566; Utrecht, Habsburg Netherlands
- Died: 1 August 1638 (aged 71–72); Utrecht, Dutch Republic
- Known for: Oil painting
- Notable work: Perseus and Andromeda, Louvre, small paintings on copper
- Movement: Northern Mannerism

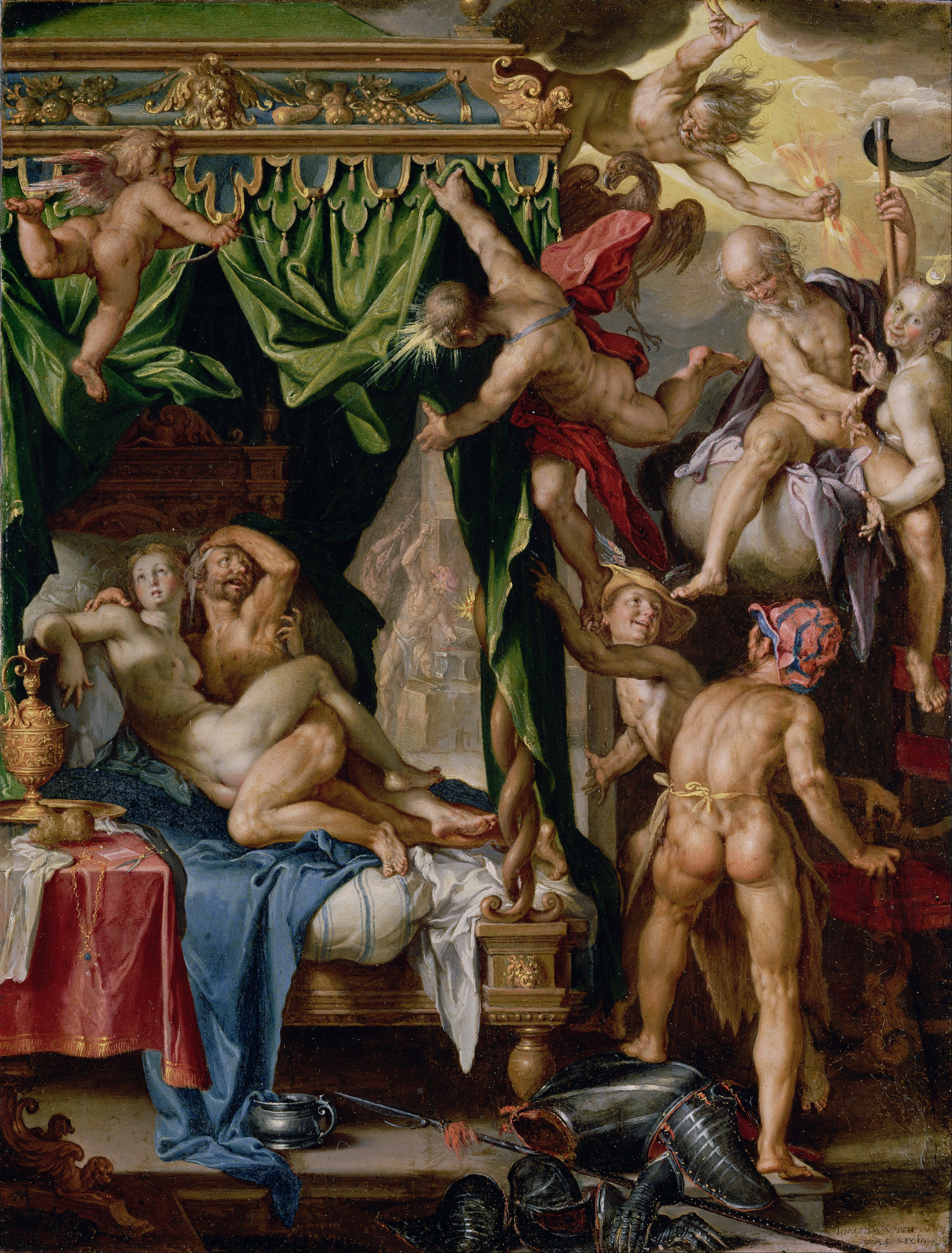
Mars and Venus Surprised by the Gods, 1605, one of several small versions Wtewael painted of the subject. 20.3 x 15.5 cm (7.99 x 6.1 in)

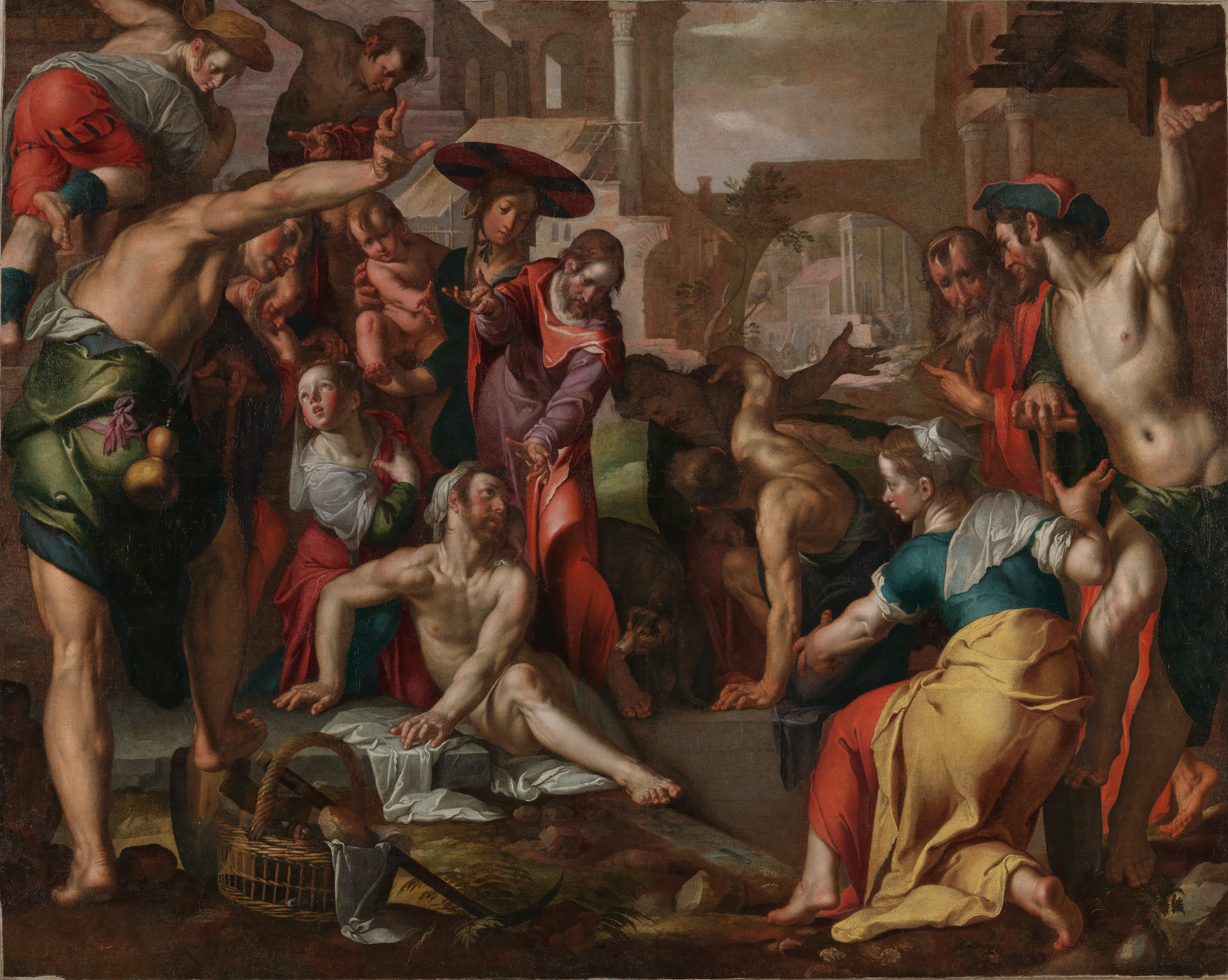
The Raising of Lazarus, c. 1605–1610, 131 x 162 cm, newly cleaned in 2015.

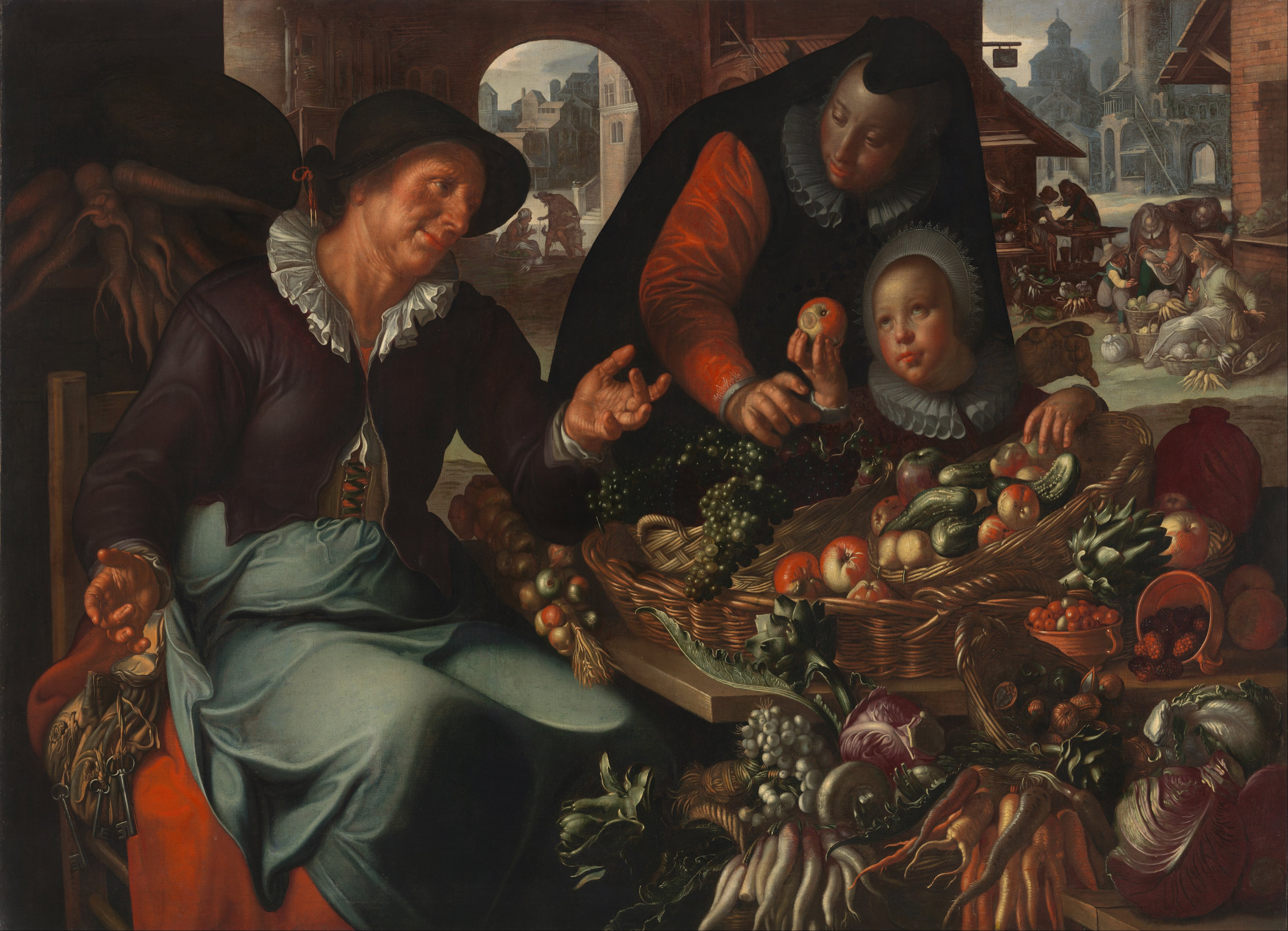
The Fruit and Vegetable Seller; the young girl has found an apple with a patch of rot

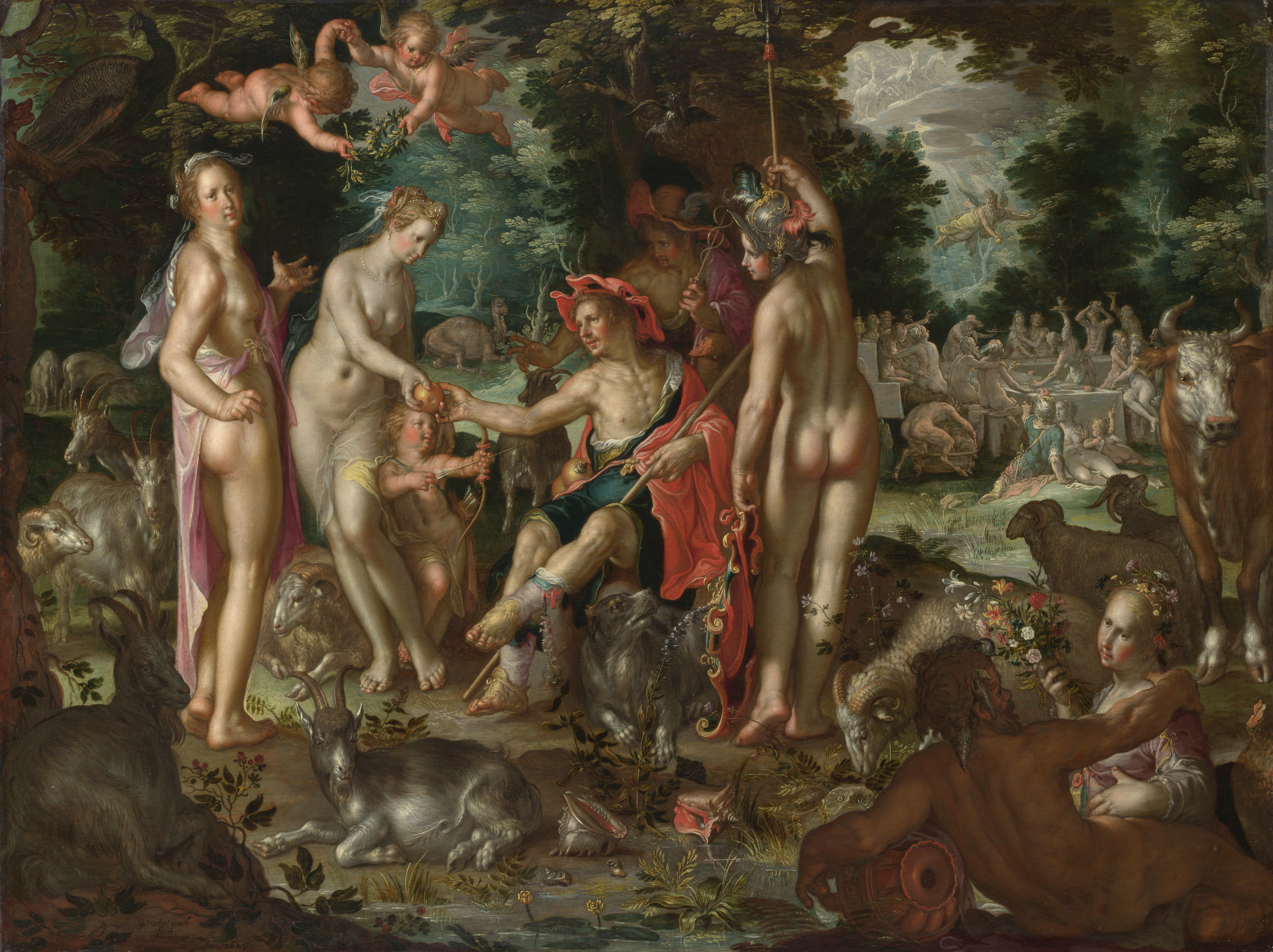
The Judgment of Paris, 1615, 59.8 x 79.2 cm (23 x 31 in)

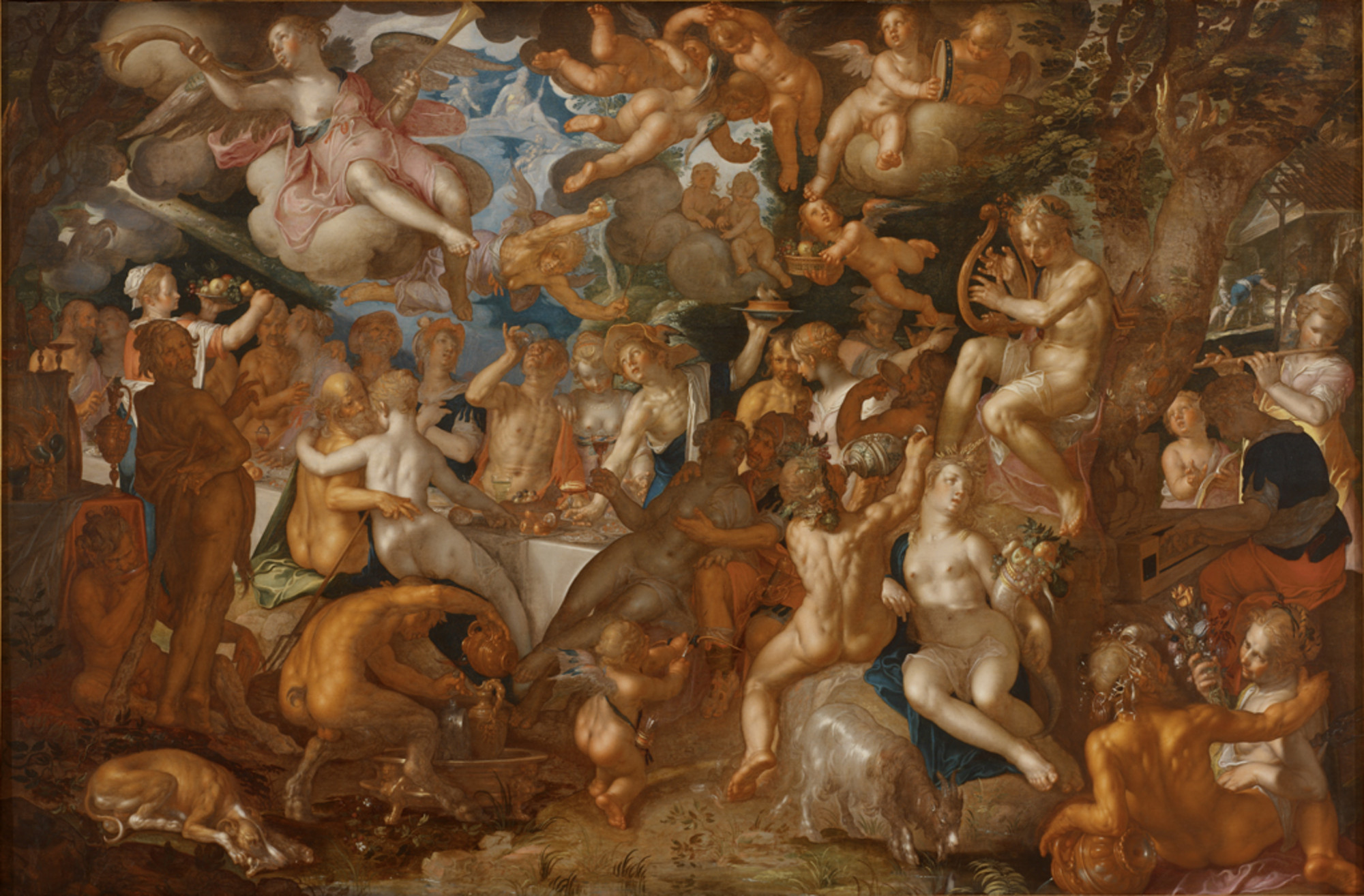
The Wedding of Peleus and Thetis, 1612, oil on panel, 109.5 x 166.4 cm (43.1 x 65.5 in)

Joachim Anthoniszoon Wtewael (Dutch pronunciation: [ˈjoːaːxɪm ˈyːtəʋaːl]; 1566 – 1 August 1638), also known as Uytewael (pronounced [ˈœytəʋaːl]), was a Dutch Mannerist painter and draughtsman, as well as a highly successful flax merchant, and town councillor of Utrecht. Wtewael was one of the leading Dutch exponents of Northern Mannerism, and his distinctive and attractive style remained largely untouched by the naturalistic developments happening around him, "characterized by masterfully drawn, highly polished figures often set in capricious poses". Wtewael was trained in the style of late 16th-century Haarlem Mannerism and remained essentially faithful to it, despite painting well into the early period of Dutch Golden Age painting.

Altogether he has left about a hundred paintings, as well as drawings and some stained glass he designed. He painted a mixture of large paintings on canvas, and tiny cabinet paintings on copper plates, the latter the more numerous and typically the most distinctive. There is also a group of mid-sized paintings, often on panel. In all these sizes he painted a mixture of conventional religious subjects and mythological ones, the latter with a strong erotic element. Especially in his works on copper he returns to the same subjects in several works, but varying the compositions. The Adoration of the Shepherds, Venus and Mars Surprised by Vulcan, and the Feast of the Gods as the wedding feasts of Cupid and Psyche, Peleus and Thetis, the latter often combined with the Judgement of Paris, and Lot and His Daughters, are some examples of these favourite subjects. The first of these was painted in all sizes. Often the large paintings contain only a few figures, but the small and middle sized ones are extremely crowded compositions, the mythological ones typically including many nudes. In some works he also revived the kitchen scene subjects of Pieter Aertsen from a half century before. According to Seymour Slive, "When well preserved his little pictures glow like gems".

He was very prosperous as a merchant of flax (for the manufacture of linen and canvas), which no doubt occupied much of his time, but was also famous as a painter in his own day, with his reputation reaching as far as Prague, where Emperor Rudolf II obtained his The Golden Age (now Metropolitan Museum of Art, New York). His large house on one of the main canals of Utrecht remains, though remodelled, and as well as family portraits the Utrecht museum has two very fine pieces of his furniture. He had several children, and seems to have stopped painting for almost the last decade of his life, perhaps influenced by the illness and death of his wife. Like his brother he was a city councillor; as a member of the main Dutch Reformed Church he was involved in the struggles with the Remonstrants. His best known work, and almost his largest, is the near life-size Perseus and Andromeda in the Louvre. Producing his highly finished small paintings was probably not very economic, and he was not short of money; his own pleasure and fame were probably his main motivations. His granddaughter still owned 30 of his paintings in 1669.

Reflecting an increase of interest in Wtewael's art in recent decades, in 2015–16 Pleasure and Piety: The Art of Joachim Wtewael (1566–1638), the first major exhibition devoted solely to his work, showed in Utrecht, Washington DC and Houston, Texas.

== Life ==
Wtewael was born and spent almost all of his life in Utrecht, where he died. He was the son of a glassmaker and glass painter who had settled in Utrecht in 1566. He began his career in Utrecht, according to Carel van Mander, as a glassmaker and glass engraver in his father's workshop. In 1586, he began four years of travelling and living in Italy and then France, the latter in the household of the bishop of St Malo, Charles de Bourgneuf de Cucé. His main Italian base was in Padua, close to Venice, and his earliest works show awareness of the Second School of Fontainebleau, which was probably the result of visiting there.

Returning to Utrecht in about 1590 (by 1592 at the latest), Wtewael established a workshop and joined the saddlemakers' guild (which in Utrecht then covered painters as well) as a painter and began producing paintings, drawings, engravings, and stained glass. Later he was a founder member of the new Utrecht Guild of Saint Luke for the painters of Utrecht. He never lived elsewhere, and seems never to have travelled outside the Netherlands again. A gentlemanly contemporary in Utrecht, who might be thought in a good position to know the artist and his work, also praised very highly Wtewael's skill in sculpture, but no clear examples of this are known.

He married Christina Wtewael van Halen (1568–1629), whose portrait of 1601 makes a pair with the self-portrait illustrated. In 1596 they had a son Peter Wtewael, who became a painter; their other son, Jan (1598–1652), may also have been a painter as, unlike Peter, he registered with the guild, in 1639 after his father's death. Joachim von Sandrart, visiting Utrecht in 1626, complained that Peter and his father neglected painting for the flax business. In the portraits by Joachim of his two sons, Peter is shown as a painter and Jan as a "humanist", carrying a book. Peter died a wealthy man in 1660, having remodelled the family house in 1639, the year after his father died.

In the late 1620s Joachim painted portraits of both his sons, dated 1628, his daughter Eva (1607–1635, see gallery) and a pair of his other daughter and her husband Johan Pater, dated 1626. All of these are in Utrecht. Burial records suggest several other children died young, but their birthdates are unknown. Wtewael's dated paintings stretch from 1592 to 1628, taking him from the age of 26 to 62.

He was on the town council in 1610 and was later awarded a seat for life by the Stadtholder Maurice, Prince of Orange for his loyalty against the Remonstrants. However his brother was also rewarded in this way and Utrecht had a rule against more than one brother being on the council at any time. So he did not take up his seat until 1632, after his brother had died. Despite a reasonable amount of documentary records, the leading scholar of his work has written that "Wtewael the man is essentially inscrutable".

== Style and reception ==
=== Development ===
He trained with the Haarlem Mannerist Joos de Beer, who also trained Abraham Bloemaert, also from Utrecht and born the same year as Wtewael. Bloemaert's later career in Utrecht contrasted strongly with Wtewael's in that he was an important teacher, with whom most of the Utrecht Caravaggisti trained at least for a while. He also changed his style significantly, reflecting newer influences from Italy and the Netherlands itself. In contrast, apart from his son Peter, Wtewael had only three recorded painting apprentices, and was without any assistance for long intervals. They were probably little help in producing his small works on copper, and none of them became well known. Wtewael was thus one of the founding generation of Utrecht painting; previously the city had been a centre for sculpture, as befitted a city governed by its bishop, but not known for painting. While Wtewael's reputation may have been beneficial to other Utrecht painters, his own style remained too retardataire for him to have much influence on them.

Wtewael's style remained largely unchanged, although his colours shifted from the acidic pastels of his earlier work to stronger shades after about 1615, and some influence from the style of Caravaggio can be detected in later works. The shift in his style can be seen in his largest painting, The Raising of Lazarus (158 x 208 cm) in Lille (illustrated in the gallery below), which though bought as a Spranger in 1900, shows a movement away from the more extreme poses and colours of the 1590s, and even from the drawing which may have been its modello. In the painting he have moved away from the small heads and over-long legs typical of Mannerism in both its Italian and Northern manifestations.

=== Portraits, religious subjects, and economics ===
In contrast, his few portraits are almost all of his family and are in a conventional and more realist style comparable to that of the leading Utrecht portraitist of his day, Paulus Moreelse (1571–1638), whose works must have been very familiar to Wtewael. The appearance of the whole family is only recorded in single formal portraits by Wtewael. He also painted a few half-length imaginary paintings of saints or gods, singly or in small groups, such as a set of the Four Evangelists that are now dispersed in various collections. The Bacchus in the gallery section was paired with a Ceres, and perhaps a now lost Venus; these may have been his last works, and show some influence from the Caravaggisti in the single large figures placed as though very close to the viewer.

His biography by Carel van Mander says regretfully that his flax business occupied much of his time, and records examples of his pictures in the collections of two wealthy Dutch collectors. Many of Bloemaert's religious paintings were produced for the Catholic semi-secret schuilkerk hidden churches of Utrecht, which had a large Catholic population who were not able to worship in public. There is no evidence, or suggestion by scholars, that Wtewael's religious paintings were produced for this market; instead they are assumed to have been for the houses of the wealthy, like his other works. Among his religious subjects, the Raising of Lazarus, which he painted at least twice, was given a specifically Protestant interpretation by contemporary Protestants, as demonstrating the efficacy of sola gratia, as well as sola fide or "justification by faith alone", since Jesus' action in restoring Lazarus to life is presented in the Gospels as unrelated to anything Lazarus has done to deserve this.

=== Mythological paintings ===
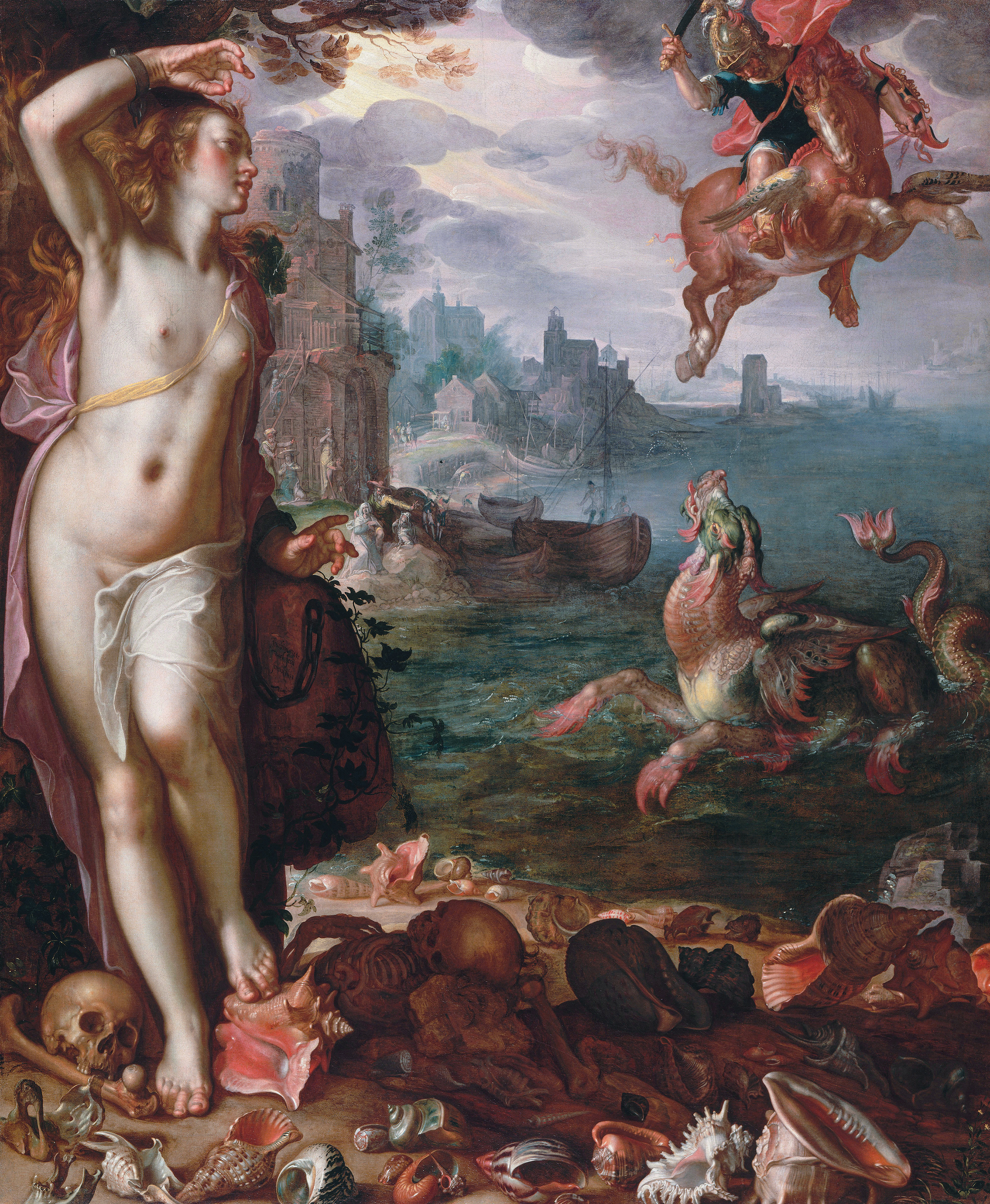
Perseus and Andromeda, 1611, 180 × 150 cm (70.9 × 59.1 in), Louvre

The eroticism of his mythological works was daring for the time, and some of the small paintings were probably not displayed publicly, by their original collectors as much as later by museums. Two of the preparatory drawings for different painted versions of Mars and Venus Surprised were mutilated by later owners to remove parts of the lovers' bodies, and the Mauritshuis version, part of the founding royal gift, was not displayed in the 1920s, the contemporary explanation being that this was "to protect an immature public from itself". It remained in storage, and rather dirty, until the 1980s, when, after the Getty Museum acquired their version of the subject, it was cleaned and placed on display, soon joining touring selections of "masterworks" from the museum.

The Getty version was itself kept in private collections in ways that meant it was not normally visible, which may partly explain its immaculate condition. Other works by Wtewael have also been changed by overpainting to hide erotic anatomical details. Wtewael had other means of creating a sensuous atmosphere, such as the suggestive pink mouths of large shells that often lie on the ground below nude females, as in the Louvre Andromeda or the National Gallery Judgement of Paris.

His depiction of erotic subjects are not simply titillating, but like many such Dutch paintings, depicted subjects that allowed for moralistic interpretations. Anne Lowenthal, the most dedicated scholar of Wtewael, has analysed his several depictions of Lot and his Daughters, dating from several periods of his career, and proposes that his treatments are designed to allude to various different possible interpretations of the biblical story, and to pose a "moral dilemma" for the viewer. His favourite subjects had all been used previously, especially in Mannerism, but his choices seem to show a deliberate avoidance of the most familiar, as in his preference for the Adoration of the Shepherds over the more common Adoration of the Magi.

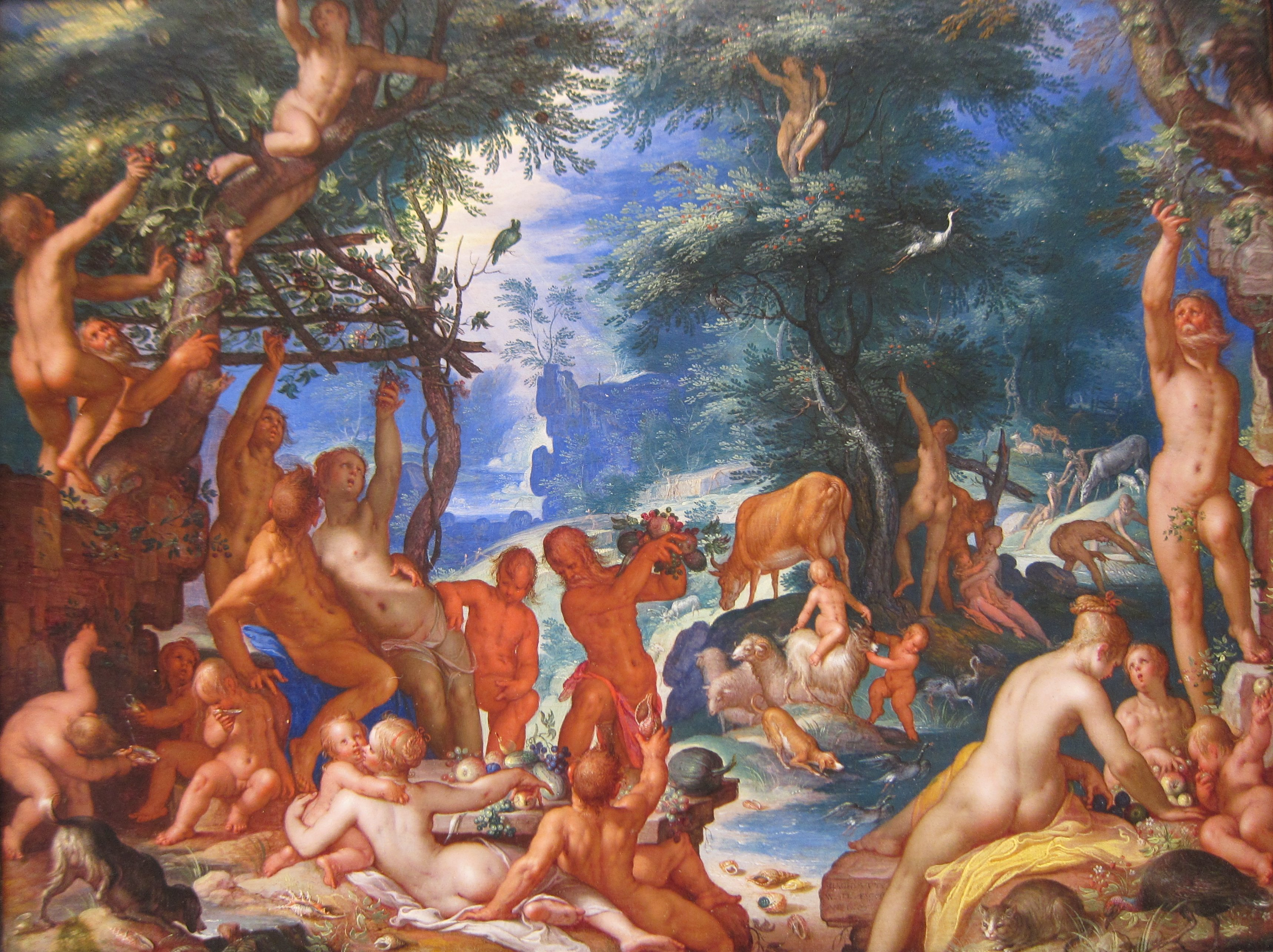
The Golden Age, 1605, once owned by Emperor Rudolf II

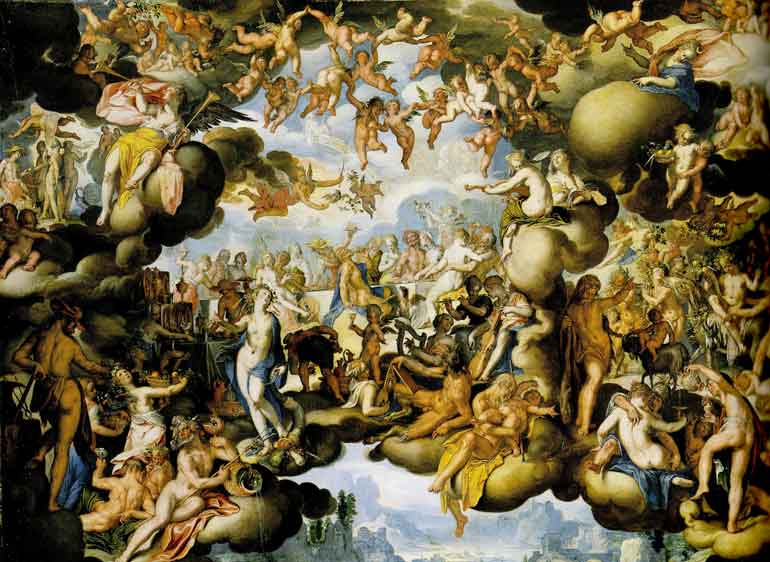
The Wedding of Peleus and Thetis, 1612, adapted from a famous drawing by Spranger, made into a print by Goltzius

About 30% of his paintings are of mythological subjects, historically an unusually large proportion even within Northern Mannerism, perhaps not exceeded before Nicolas Poussin. His treatments are not without realist elements; the furniture, metalware, and other props are often carefully depicted versions of the luxury products of his own day, and the faces of his Olympians often un-idealized and very Dutch-looking, so that the viewer "often has the sense of seeing flesh and blood figures in bizarre circumstances rather than fantasies tinged by observations from life". Dutch art theory of the day recognised two "pictorial modes": "'realist' depiction naer het leven (from the life) and 'ideal' imitation uyt den geest (from the spirit or intellect)." These were respectively associated with "low" subjects and history painting, but it was a characteristic feature of Wtewael's work to combine both in a single picture.

Among his favourite subjects, the Feast of the Gods, typically particularized as either the wedding of Cupid and Psyche or that of Peleus and Thetis, sometimes appeared in Italian Renaissance art, but became especially popular in Northern Mannerist painting. This seems to spring from a large engraving of 1587 by Hendrik Goltzius in Haarlem of a drawing by Bartholomeus Spranger (now Rijksmuseum) that Carel van Mander had brought back from Prague, where Spranger was court painter to Emperor Rudolf II. The Feast of the Gods at the Marriage of Cupid and Psyche was so large, at 16 7/8 x 33 5/8 in. (43 x 85.4 cm), that it was printed from three different plates. More than 80 figures are shown, placed up in the clouds over a world landscape that can be glimpsed below. The composition borrows from both Raphael and Giulio Romano's versions. Among several other compositions of Feasts, Wtewael produced a painted version of this, much smaller than the print or drawing, but still with dozens of figures (illustrated left).

Mars and Venus Surprised came from Ovid, and was usually one of the scenes shown in illustrated editions. Wtewael's approach to this subject too can be traced back to Spranger and Goltzius, and a drawing of 1585 by the latter (now in the Getty Museum) is close to Wtewael's several compositions, with a scrum of figures hovering over an elaborate bed. Drawings by Bloemaert may also have had an influence.

== Collections ==
The largest collection of his work, which includes a self-portrait (1601), and several other family portraits, is in the Centraal Museum, Utrecht, who were given works that had remained in the family until recent decades. Several other Dutch, German, British and American museums have works, but many also remain in private collections.

The 1998 legal case City of Gotha and Federal Republic of Germany v Sotheby's and Cobert Finance S.A. in the English High Court concerned the ownership of a Wtewael painting, The Holy Family with Saints John and Elizabeth and the Angels, once in the collection of the Dukes of Saxe-Coburg and Gotha. The painting had a confused history at the end of World War II and in the years immediately following. In 2026 the painting was in the Ducal Museum Gotha.

Some large zoomable images:

- Mars and Venus Surprised by Vulcan, about 1606 – 1610, 20.3 x 15.5 cm (8 × 6 1/8 in.). Getty Museum, Malibu
- The Holy Family with Saints and Angels, c. 1606–1610, oil on copper, 19.8 x 15.5 cm, Museo Thyssen-Bornemisza, Madrid
- The Judgement of Paris, 1615, National Gallery, London

== Gallery ==
Large paintings

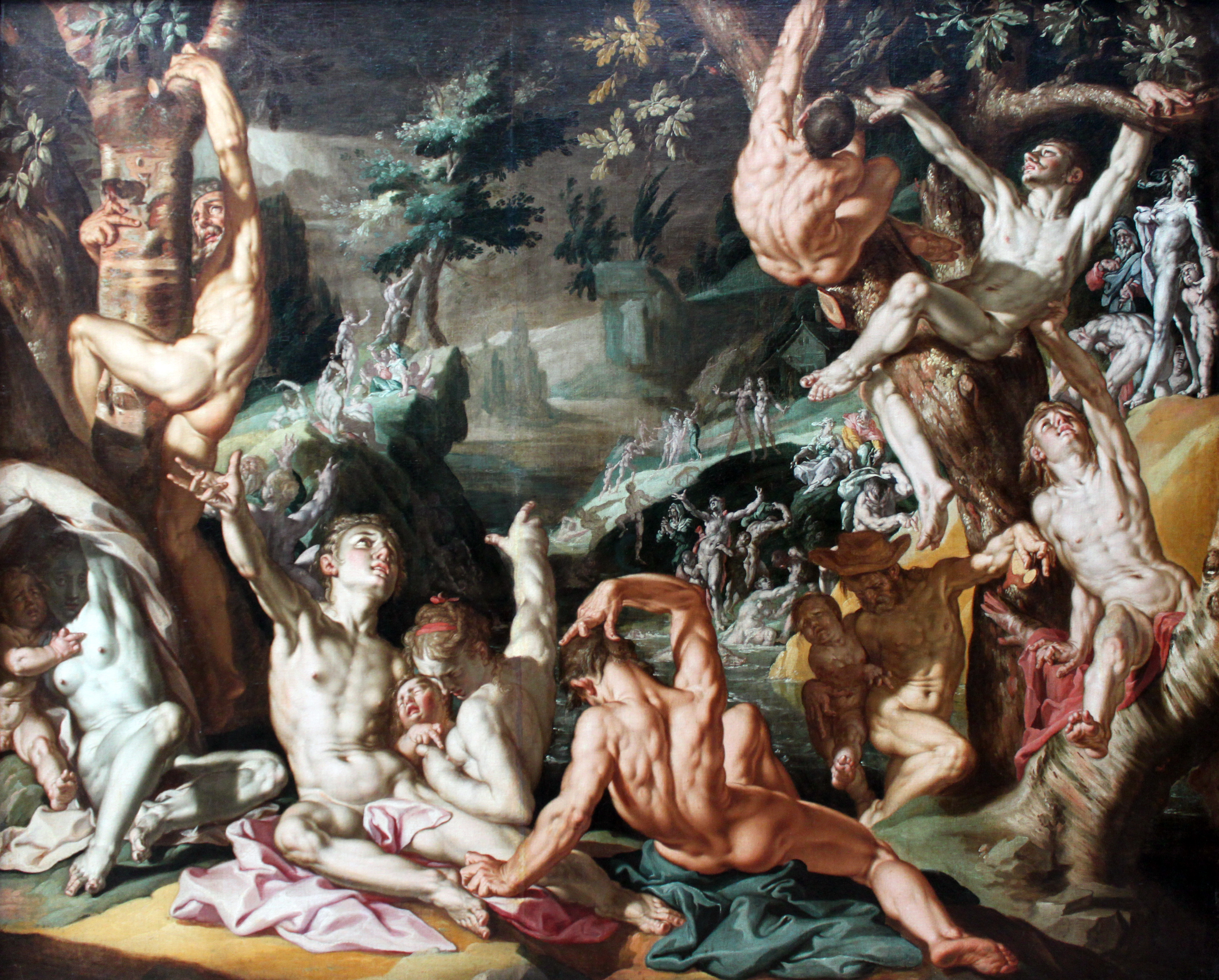
The Deluge, 1595, 148 x 184.6 cm

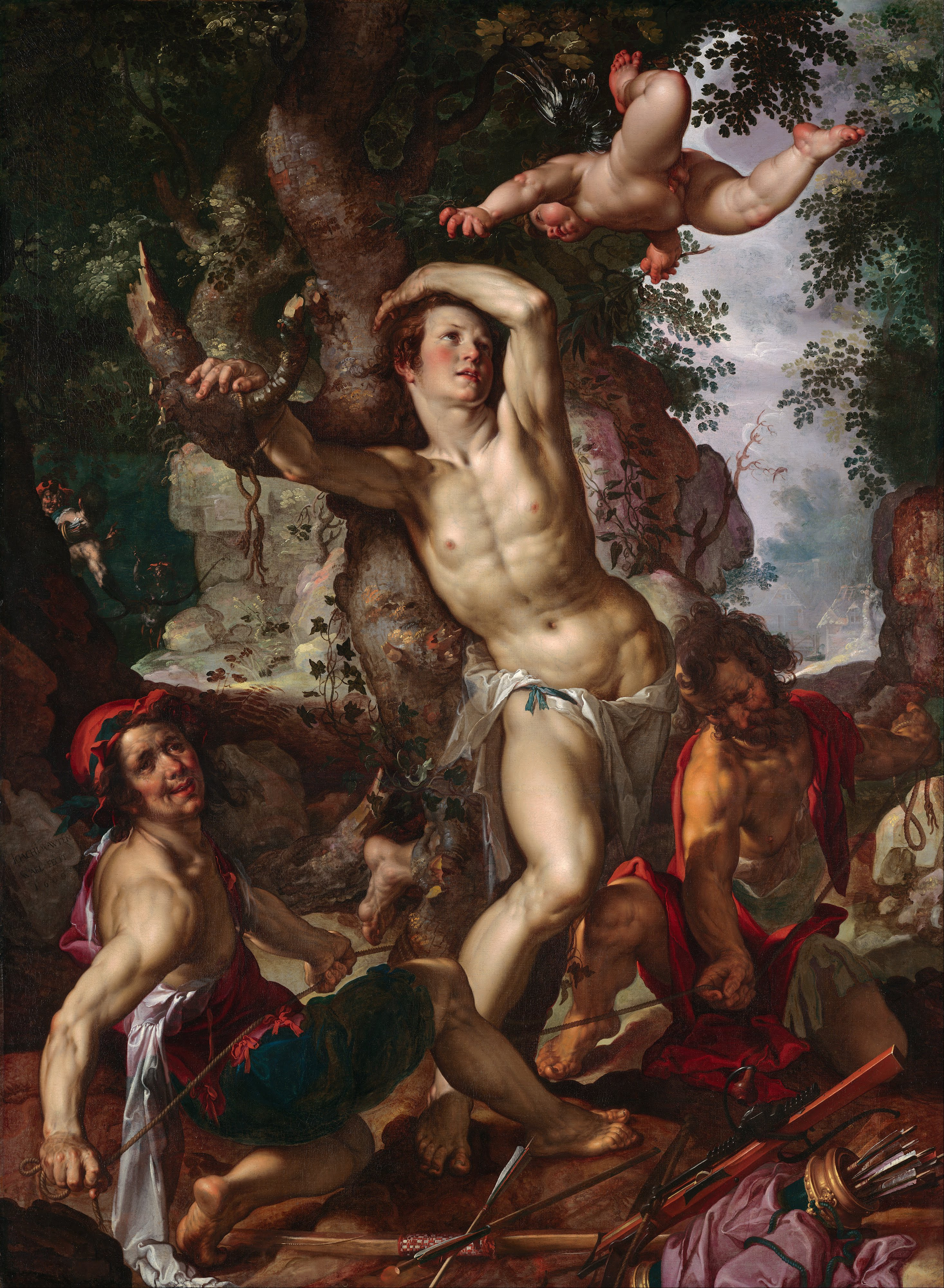
Martyrdom of Saint Sebastian, 1600, 169 x 125 cm (66.6 x 49.3 in)

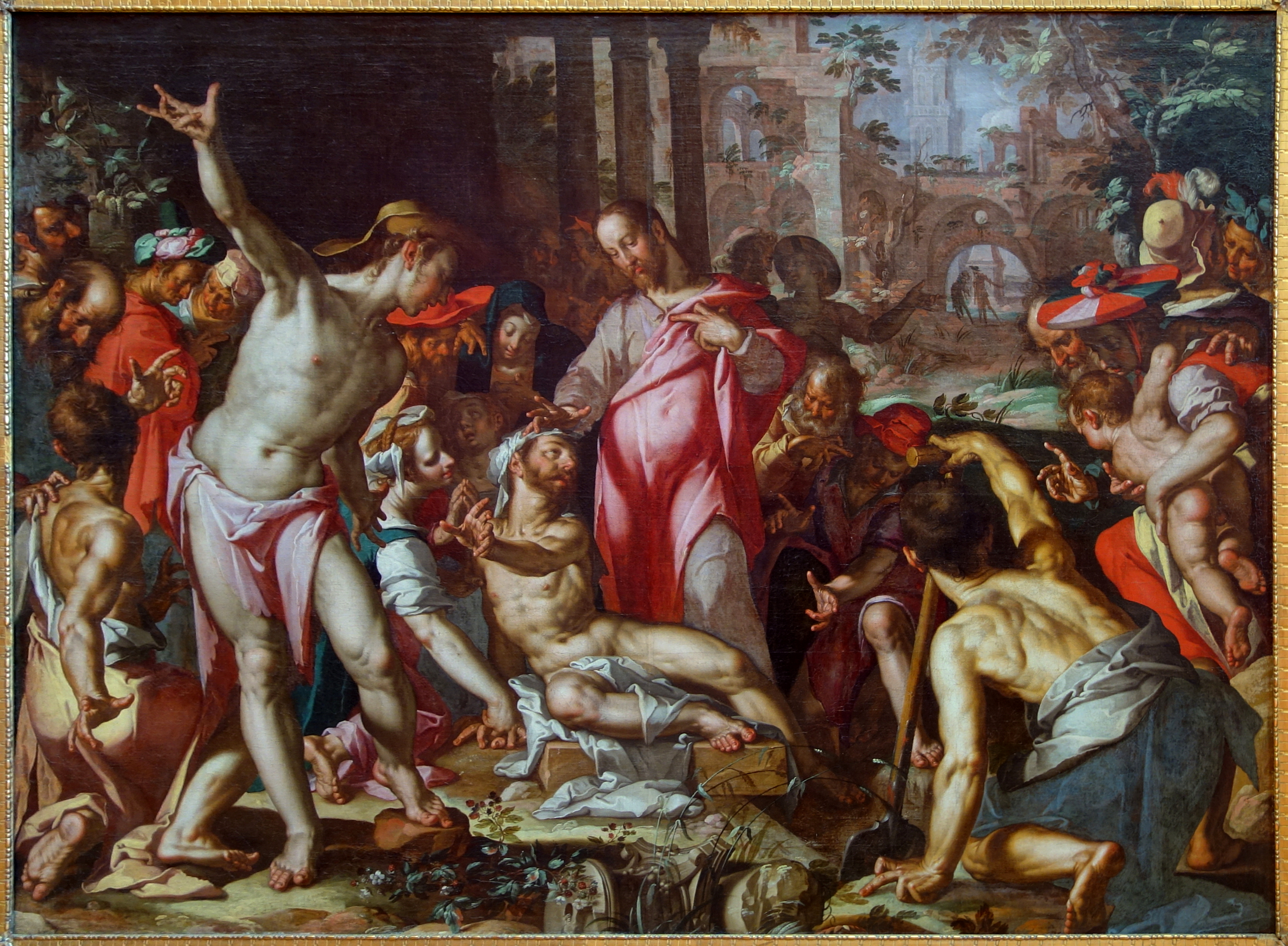
Raising of Lazarus, about 1600, his largest painting at 158 x 208 cm, Lille

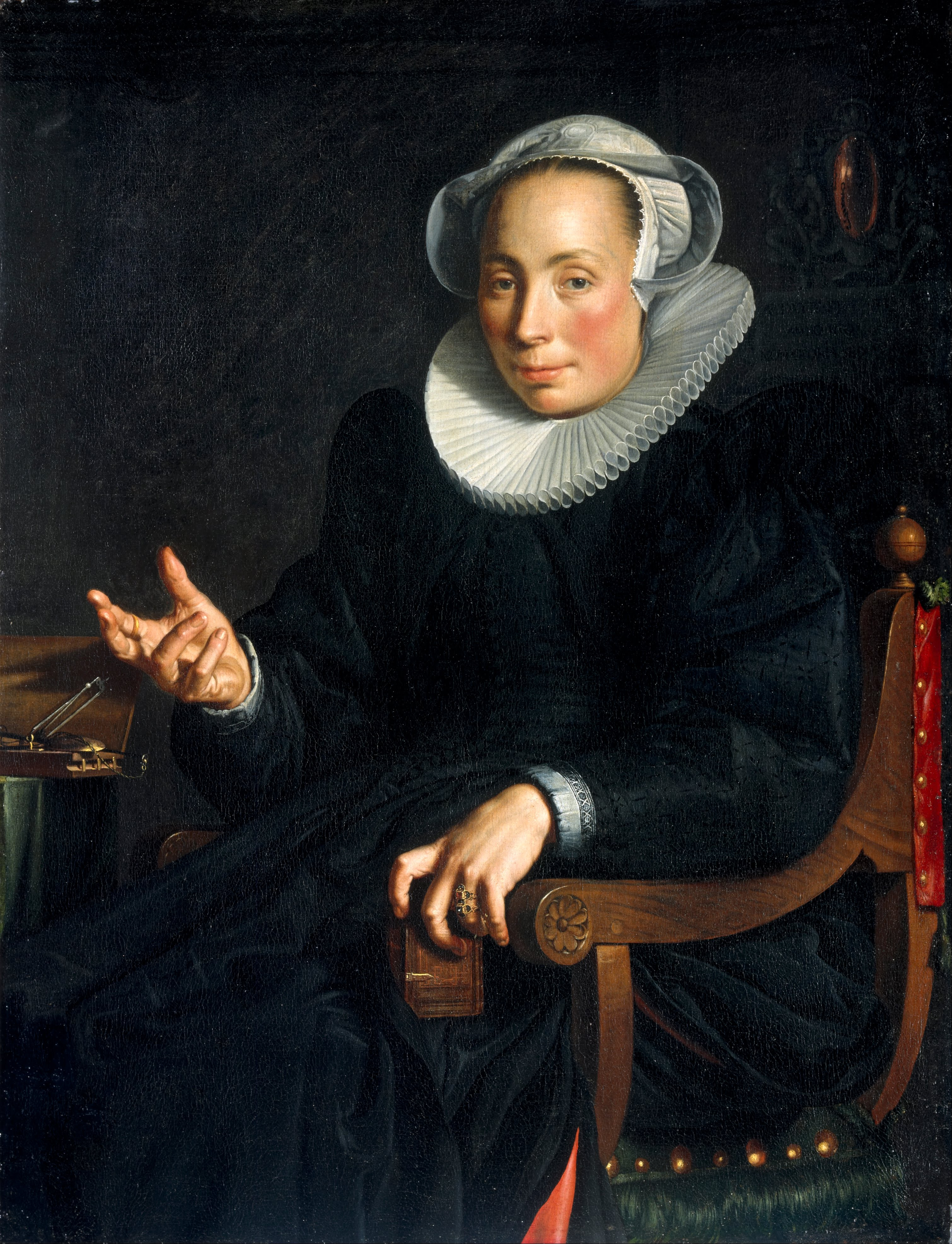
His wife, Christina Wtewael van Halen (1568-1629), 1601

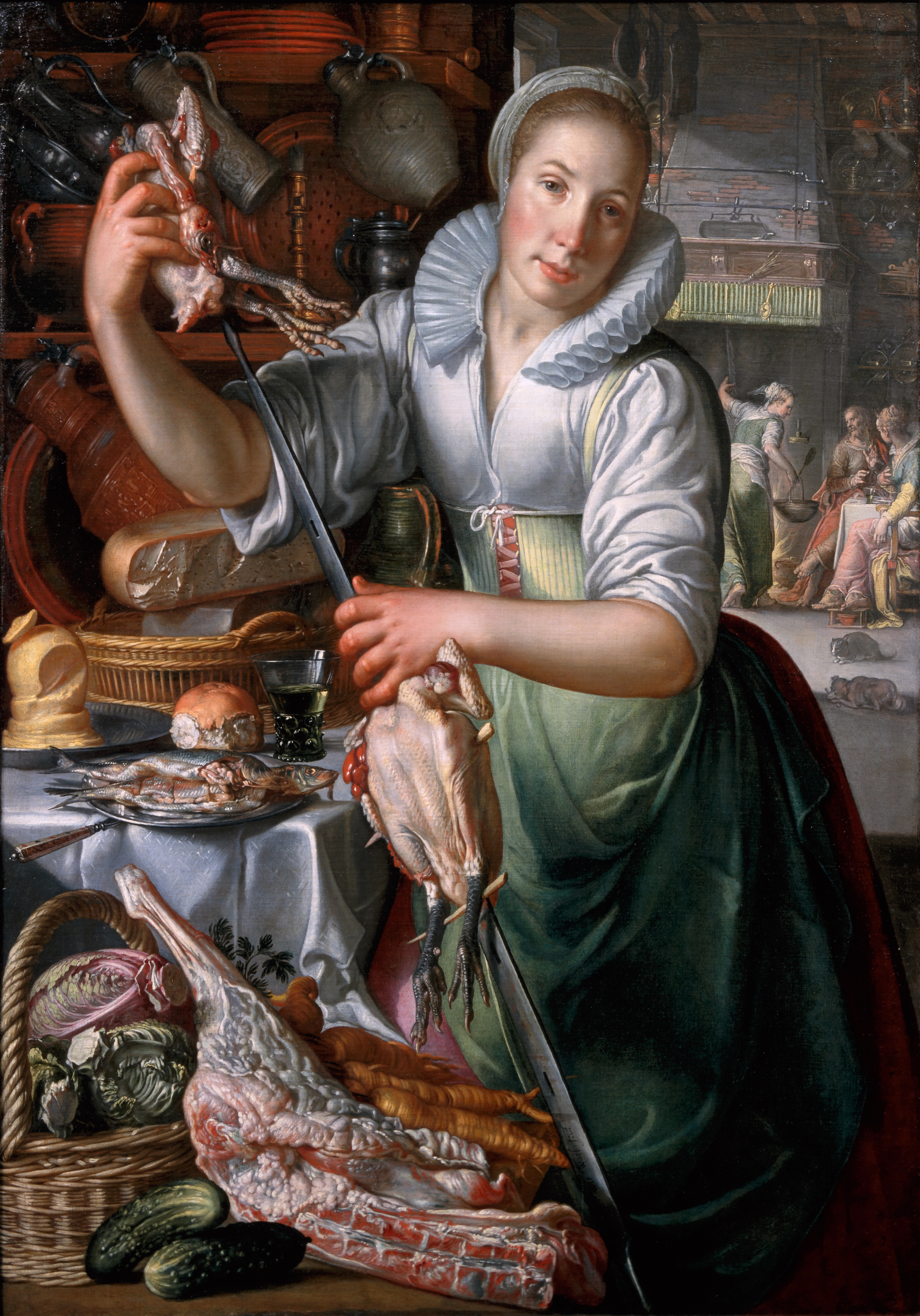
A Kitchenmaid, in the background Jesus in the house of Mary and Martha, 1620–25. Close to works by Pieter Aertsen, 103 x 72 cm

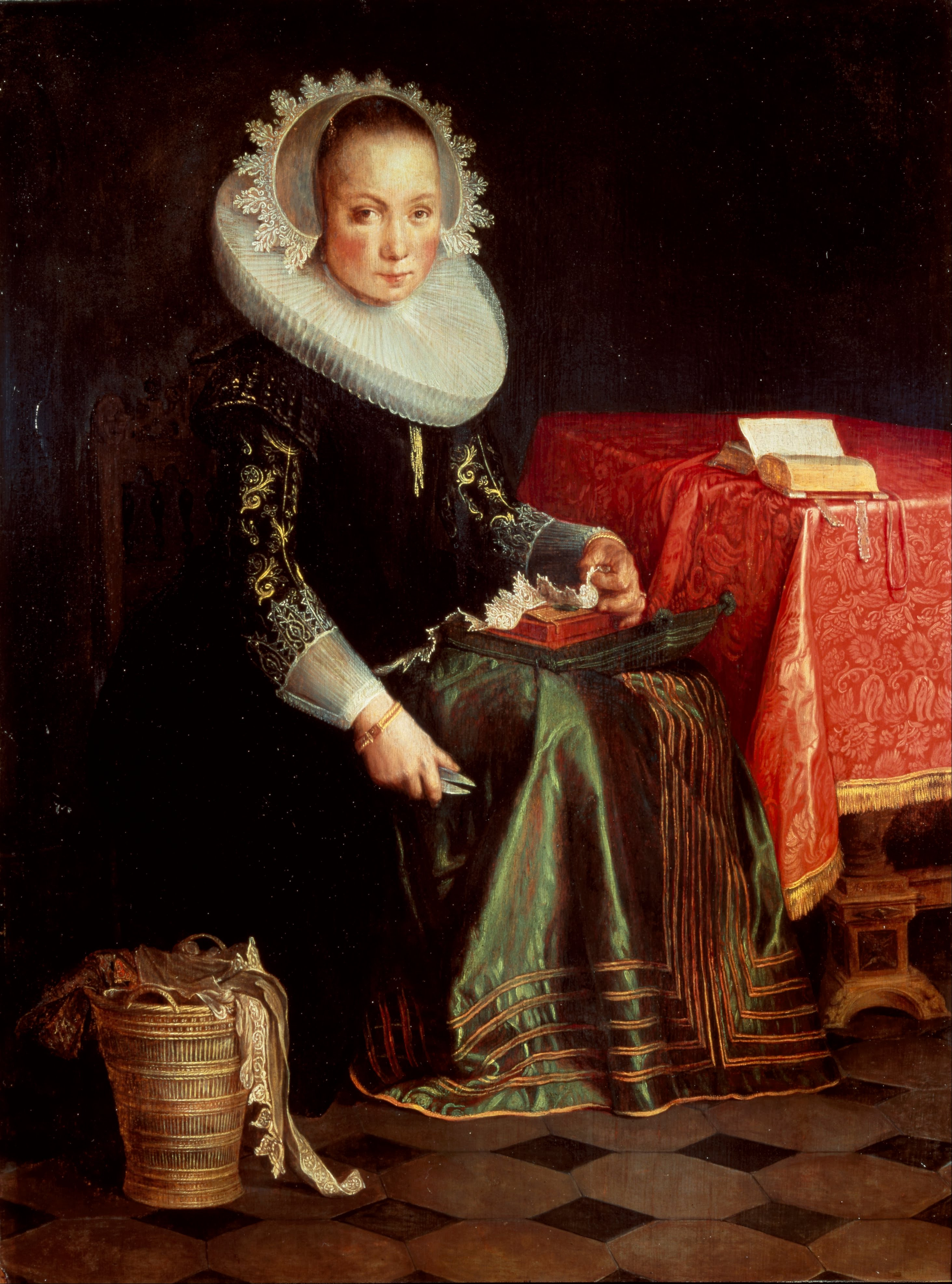
His daughter Eva Wtewael (1607-1635), 1628, shown needleworking, not typical for a portrait of a wealthy woman

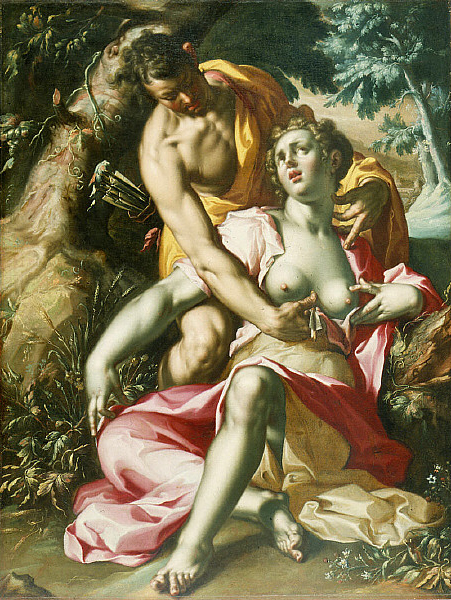
Cephalus and Procris (The Death of Procris)

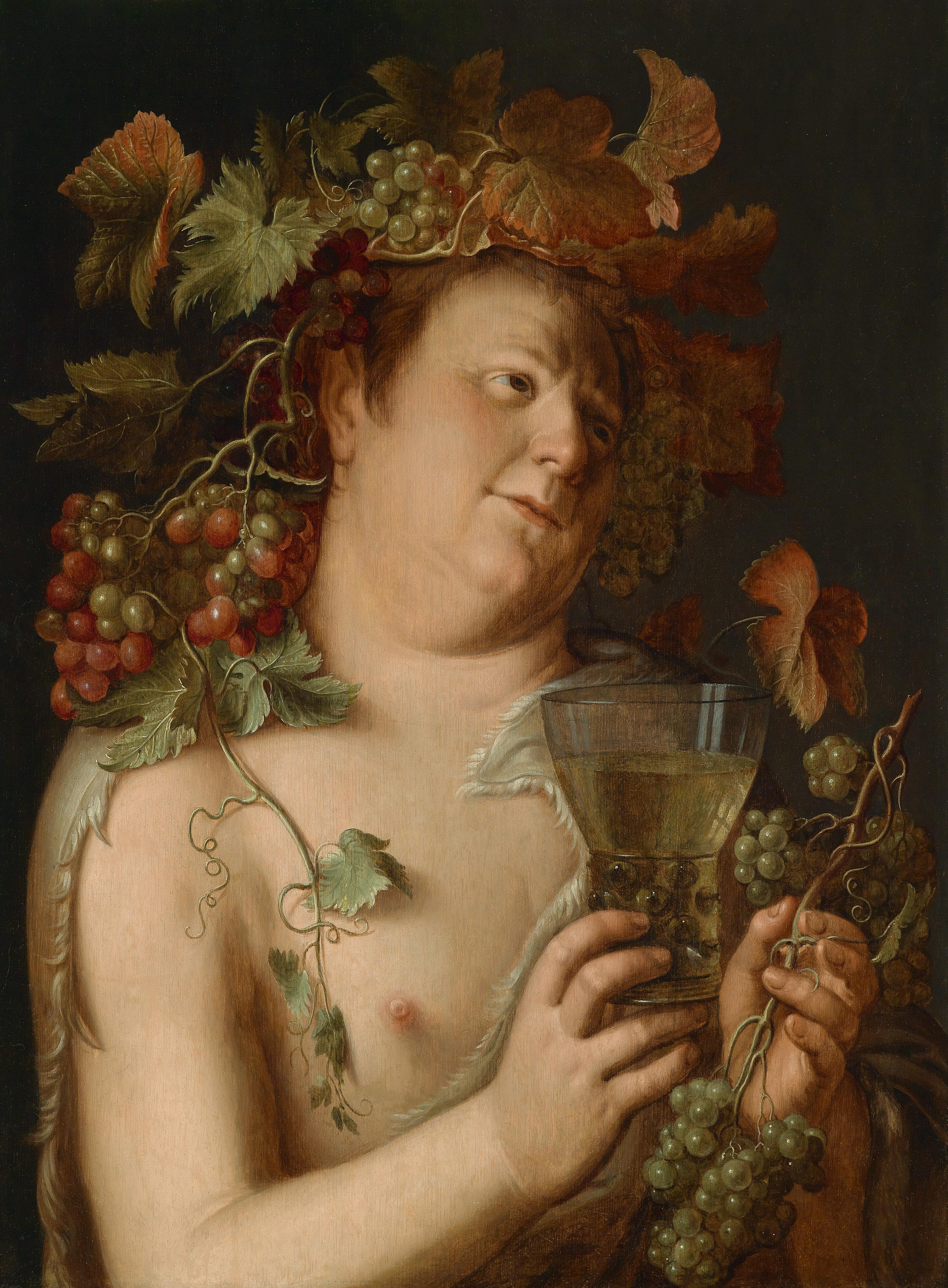
Bacchus, about 1628, one of his last works

Smaller paintings

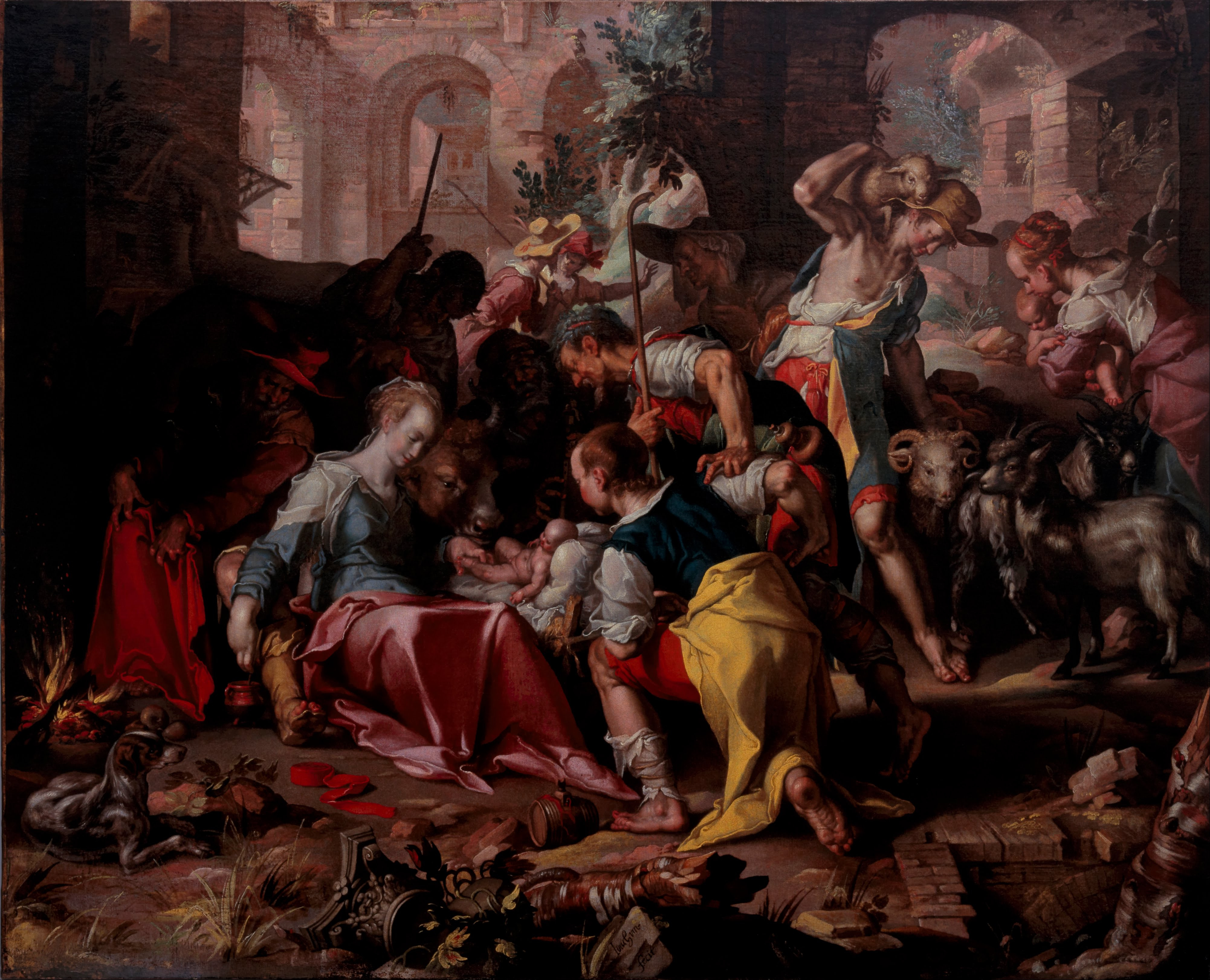
Adoration of the Shepherds, 1598, 8.67 x 10.7 cm (3.41 x 4.21 in)

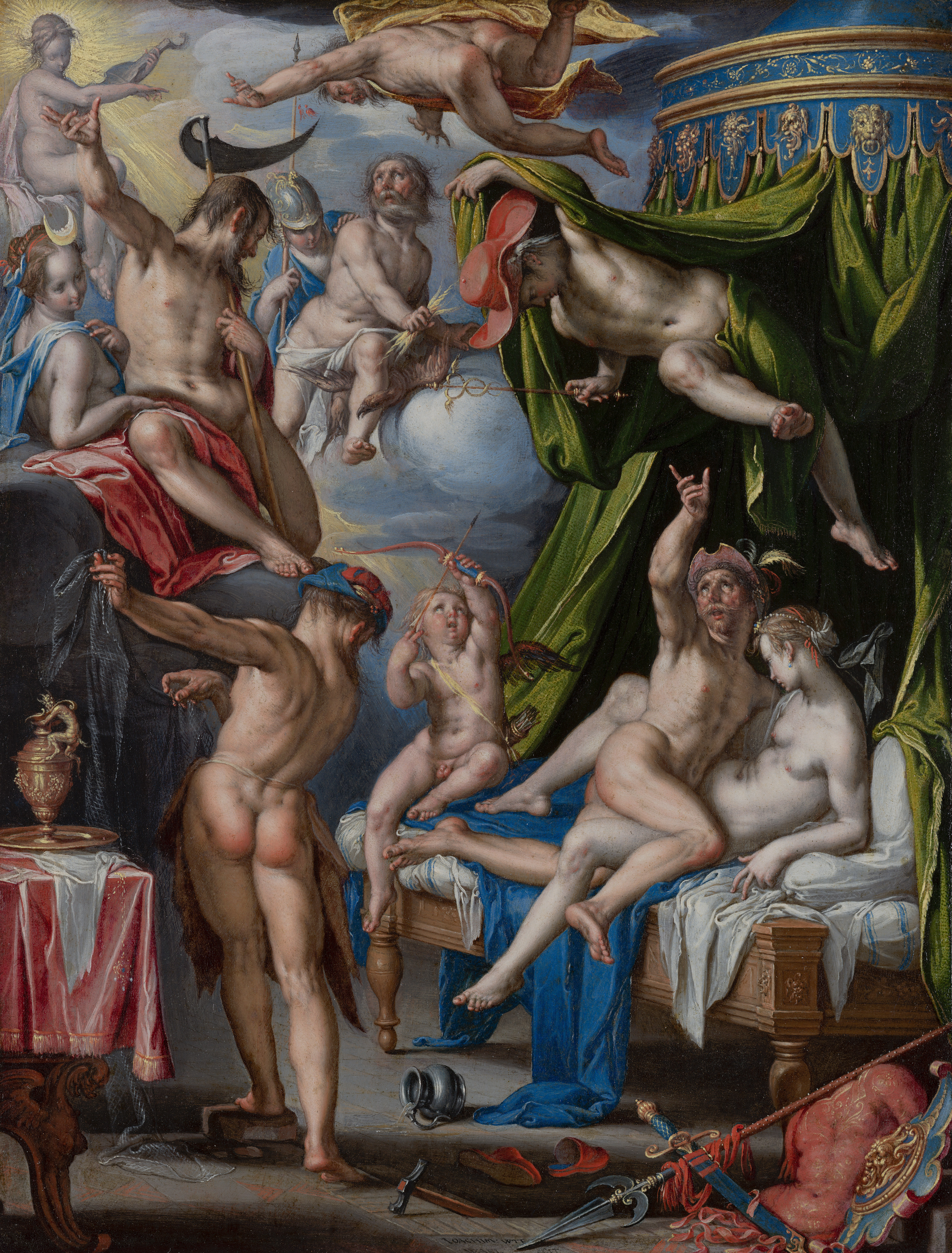
Mars and Venus Surprised by the Gods, Mauritshuis version, 1601

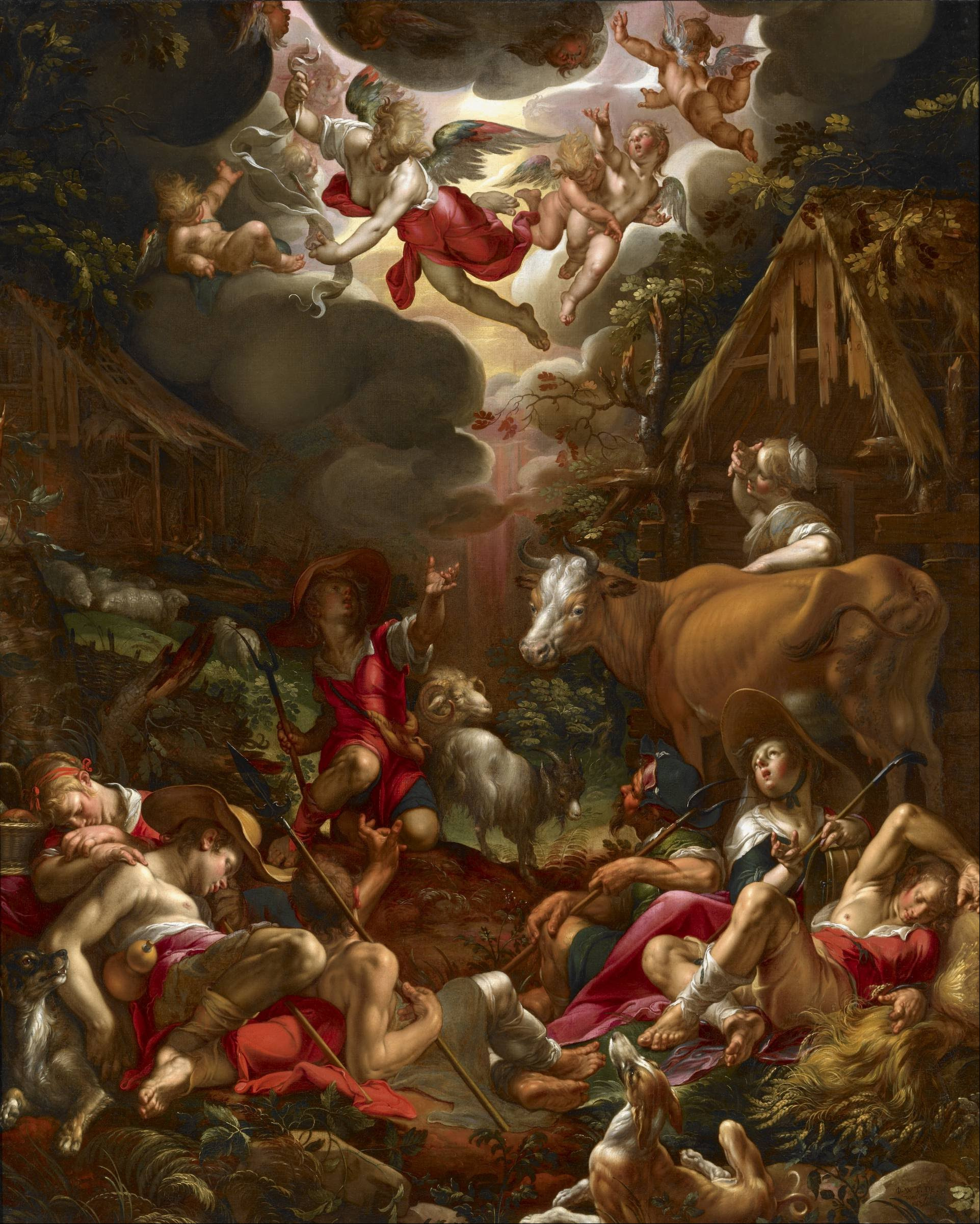
Annunciation to the Shepherds, 1606, on canvas, unusually for such a small work. 16.83 x 13.59 cm (6.63 x 5.35 in)

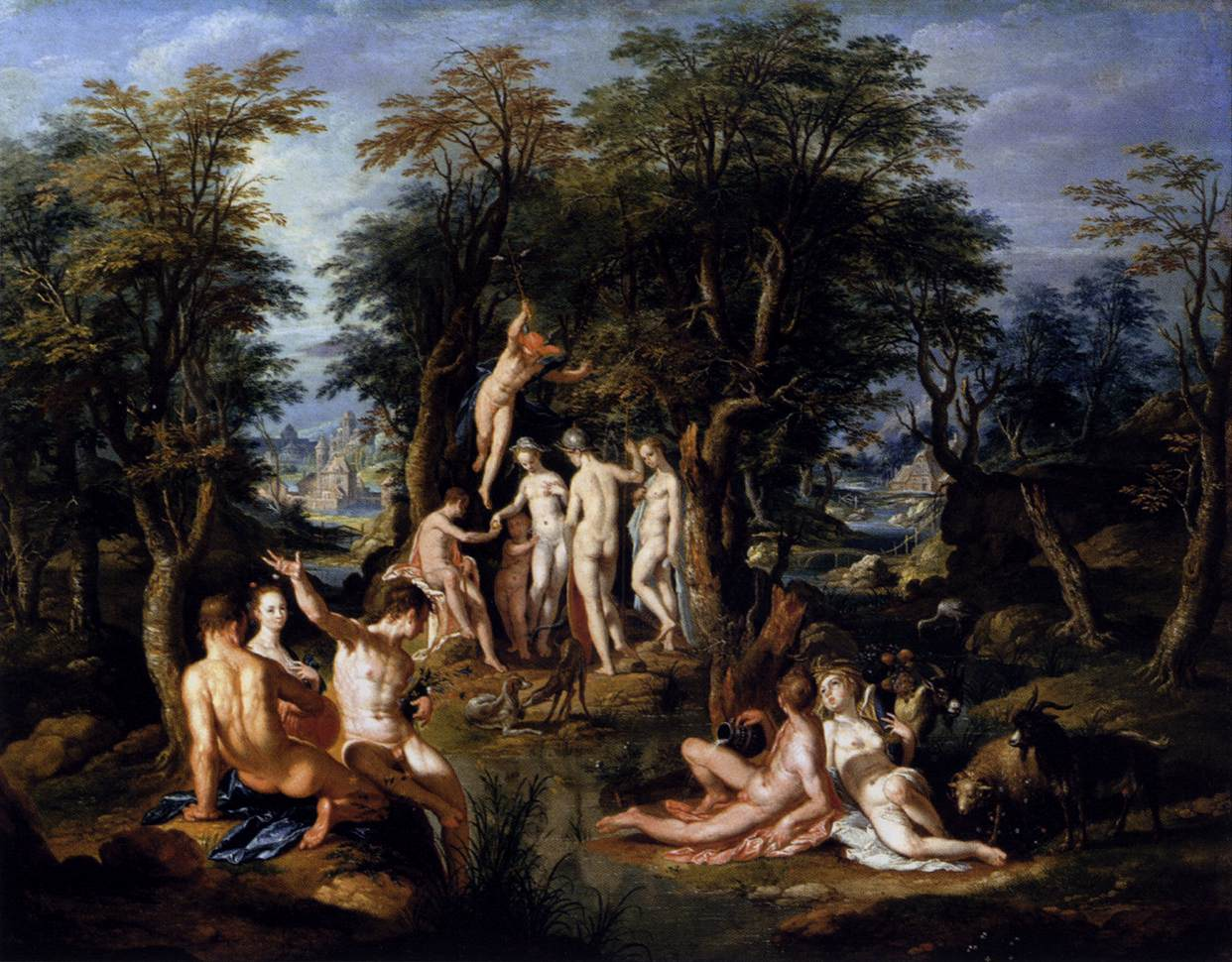
Judgment of Paris, c. 1605

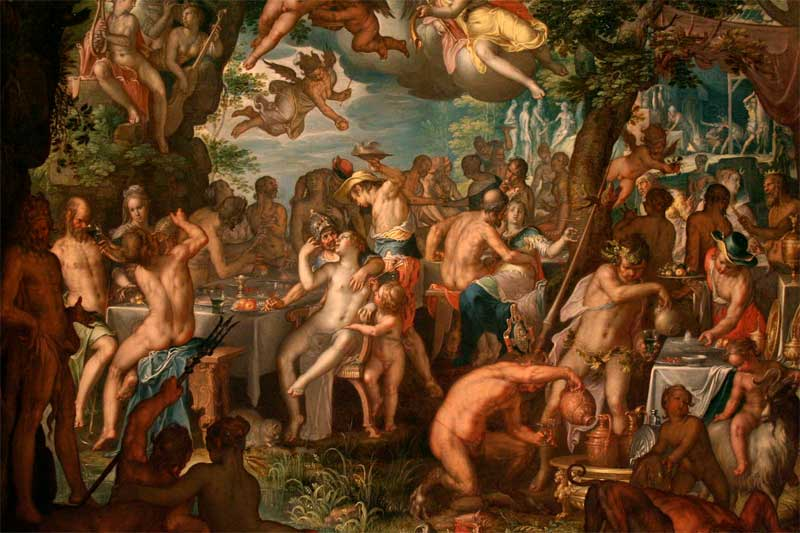
The Wedding of Peleus and Thetis, 1612

Moses Striking the Rock, 1624, 44.6 × 66.7 cm (17.6 × 26.3 in)

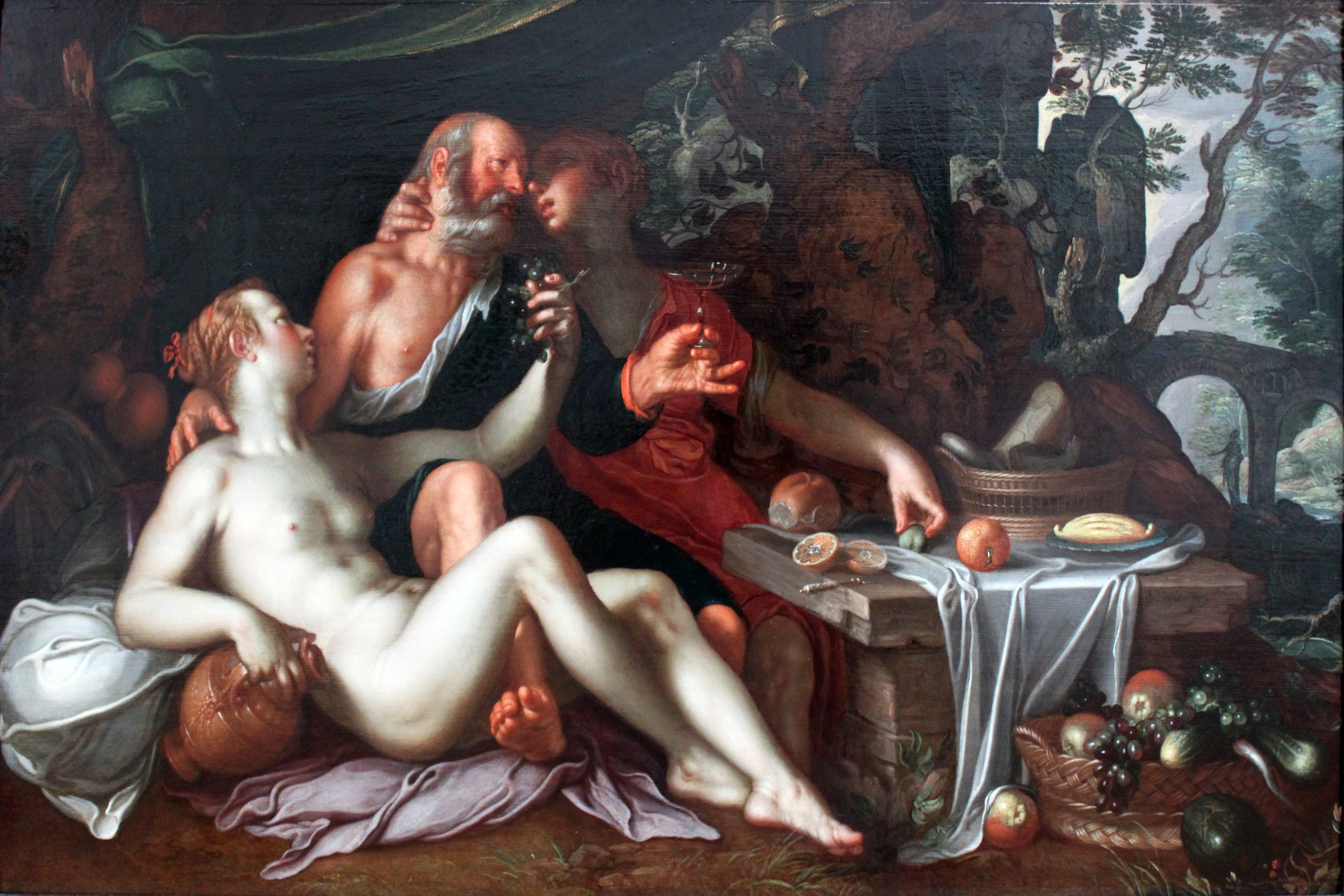
Lot and His Daughters, a late work

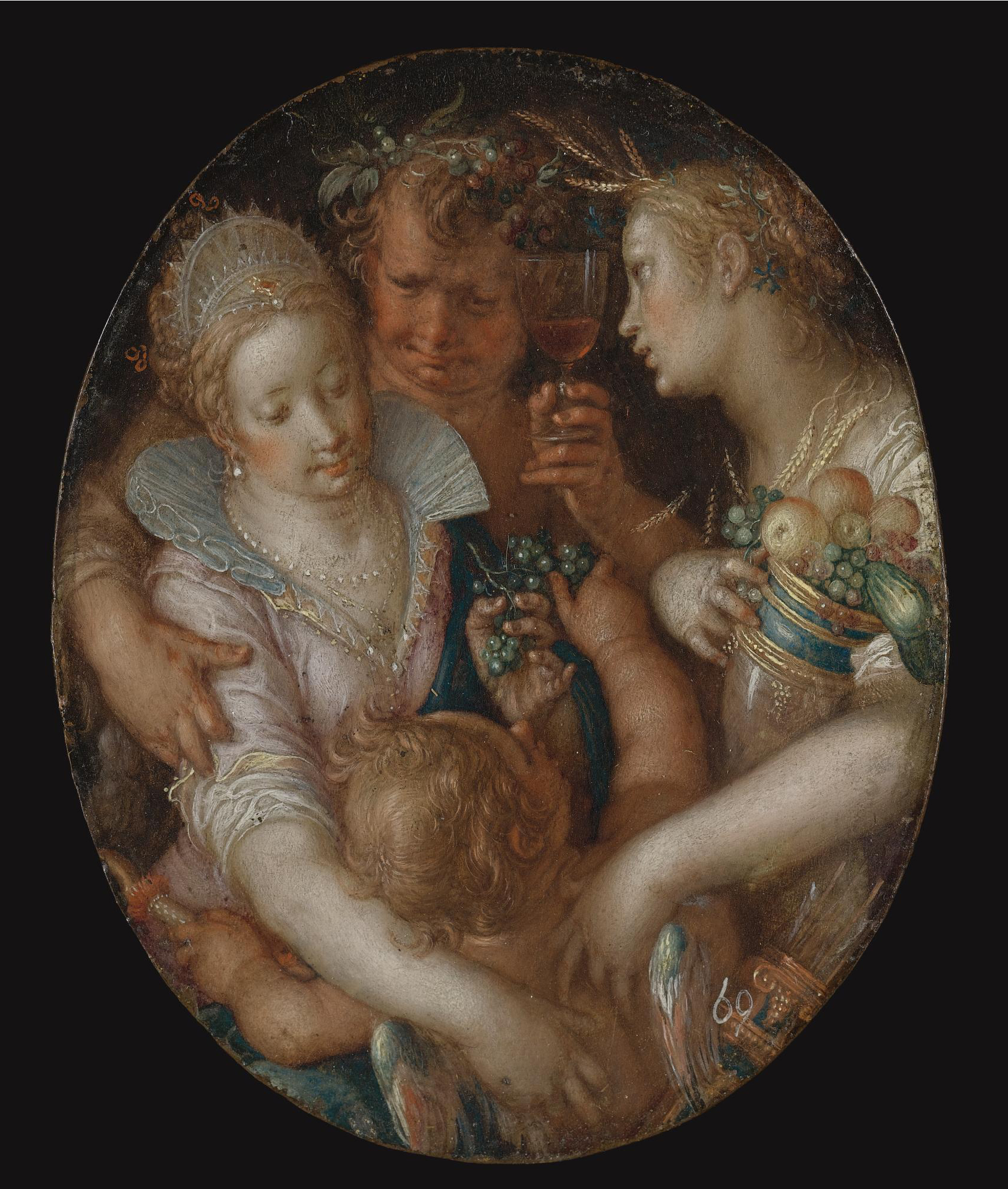
Sine Cerere et Baccho friget Venus, Bacchus, Ceres and Venus, oil on copper, 10.5 x 8.6 cm.

== See also ==
- City of Gotha and Federal Republic of Germany v. Sotheby's and Cobert Finance S.A.
