= Harold Cobert =

French writer

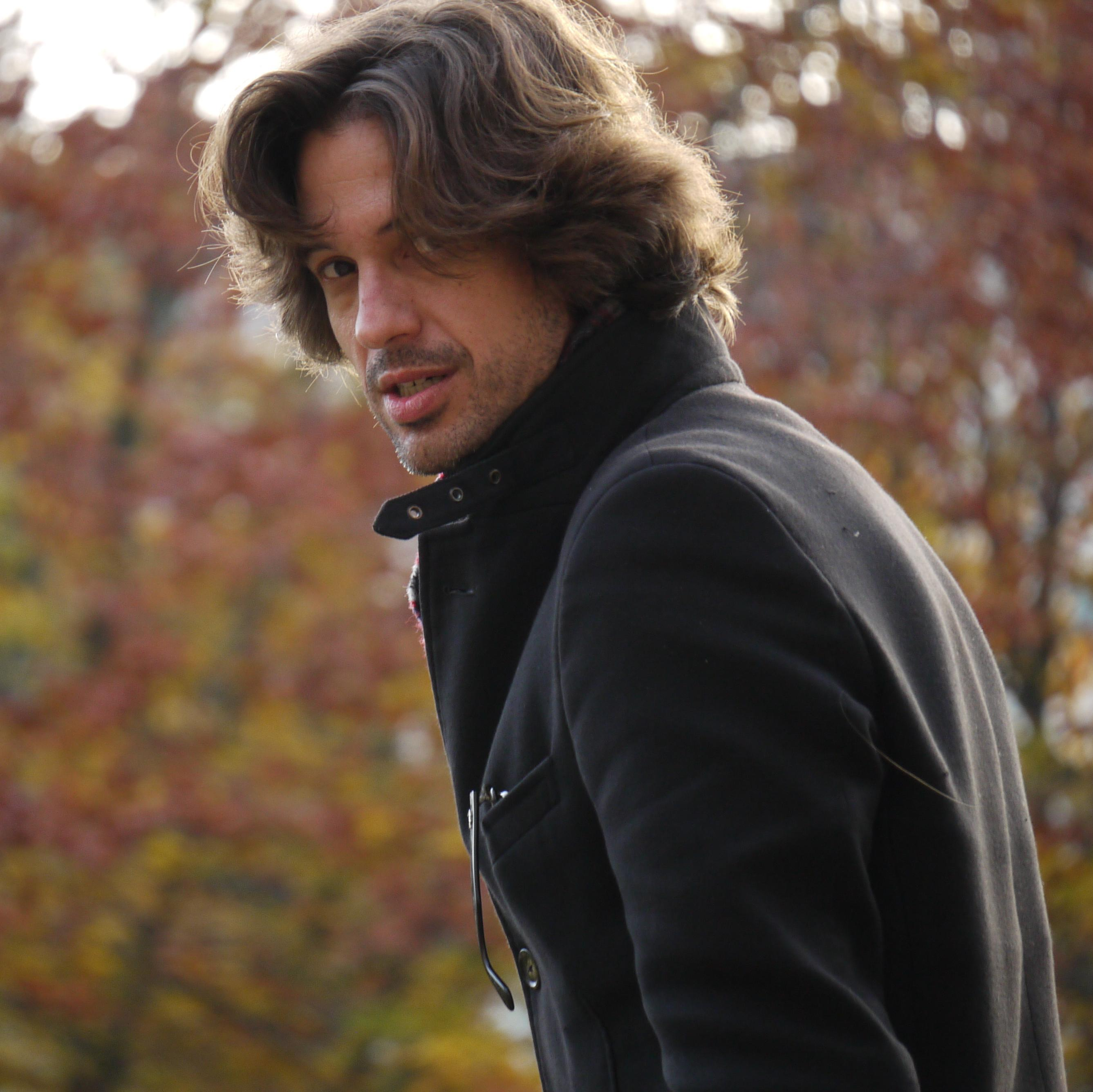
Harold Cobert

Harold Cobert is a French writer. He was born in Bordeaux in 1974. He is the author of Un hiver avec Baudelaire (2009), L’Entrevue de Saint-Cloud (2010), Dieu surfe au Pays basque (2011), Au nom du père, du fils et du rock’n’roll (2013) and Lignes brisées (2015).

== Biography ==
Harold Cobert was born in 1974, the grandson of Roger Lafosse (1927–2011), creator of the Sigma Festival. He began writing while pursuing literary studies. With a passion for the 18th century, he holds a Doctor of Arts, with a thesis directed by Jean-Jacques Tatin-Gourier and defended in 2003 at the University of Tours, devoted to Mirabeau: Mirabeau polygraphe: du pornographe à l'orateur politique.

In 2002, he published a 6-volume essay entitled Mirabeau, le fantôme du Panthéon, dedicated to this key figure of the French Revolution.

His first novel, Le Reniement de Patrick Treboc, published by JC Lattès in February 2007, tells the story of a young upright teacher who accidentally commits a crime and is released from prison thanks to a Reality television show of his own making. It's “a satire of the entertainment society and its influence on young people”.

In May 2009, Un hiver avec Baudelaire is published by Héloïse d'Ormesson. In the spring, Philippe separated from his wife and also lost his job. In spite of himself, he is drawn into the downward spiral of poverty. Now homeless, he is confronted with the violence of the street and the indifference of the world. Until one day, in the dead of winter, just as he's about to fall into a mental breakdown, he meets someone, including “Baudelaire”. Thanks to this companion in misfortune, he pulls through . A novel that blends romance and social truth, poetry and harshness, this account of the process of Social exclusion is also a story of friendship, reminding us of life's precarious balance. Un hiver avec Baudelaire has been published in Germany, Taiwan and Italy, as well as in Greece. Published by France Loisirs since spring 2010, it will also be released by Livre de Poche in spring 2011.

On August 26, 2010, L'Entrevue de Saint-Cloud was published by Héloïse d'Ormesson. On July 3, 1790, with the monarchy in peril and France's future uncertain, Marie Antoinette granted Mirabeau a secret audience at Saint-Cloud. Will these few covert hours be enough for the libertine Count to reverse the inexorable course of history? Paradoxically, the people's orator, elected by the Estates of the realm, is driven by a single desire: to save the throne. Will the redoubtable tribune use all his eloquence to win the Queen over to his convictions? Harold Cobert imagines what this conversation might have been like. A duel between two worlds, L'Entrevue de Saint-Cloud is a historical novel that shows the fragility of collective destinies. L'Entrevue de Saint-Cloud was published in 2010. It won the Prix du Style 2010 and was included in the “Sélection Cultura Jeunes Talents 2010-2011” and the first selection for the Prix des libraires.

In March 2012, Dieu surfe au Pays basque was published by Héloïse d'Ormesson, an intimate novel featuring a man's unprecedented perspective on his wife's Miscarriage. Harold Cobert also published a book on Jim Morrison in Paris in 2014. In 2016, he published La Mésange et l'Ogresse, a work of fiction about Monique Olivier, wife of Michel Fourniret. It is based on very real elements, the minutes of the trial and witness accounts.
