= City of Gotha and Federal Republic of Germany v Sotheby's and Cobert Finance S.A. =

1998 High Court of England and Wales case

The City of Gotha v Sotheby's
- The painting The Holy Family with Saints John and Elizabeth and the Angels
- Court: High Court (England & Wales)
- Full case name: The City of Gotha and Federal Republic of Germany v Sotheby's and Cobert Finance S.A.
- Decided: 19 June 1997
- Citation: The Times (9 September 1998)

Case history
- Prior action: [1997] EWCA Civ 1897, [1998] 1 WLR 114

Court membership
- Judge sitting: Moses J

Keywords
- conflict of laws; lex situs; personal property; conveyance; cultural artifacts; acts of state

The City of Gotha and Federal Republic of Germany v Sotheby's and Cobert Finance S.A. was a September 1998 case in the High Court of England and Wales involving the ownership of a Joachim Wtewael painting. The case was the first reported court decision on section 221 of the German Civil Code (BGB), a section that was repealed a few years later as part of the 2002 reform to the law of obligations of Germany (see also law of obligations). This section involved the limitation of proprietary actions when a third party has acquired possession of the property. The case is important in regards to the concepts of statutes of limitation and acquisitive prescription. The decision is noted for the judge's humorous writing.

In 2026 the painting was in the Ducal Museum Gotha.

Despite the importance of the decision under both English and German law, it does not appear in any of the official law reports or on BAILII, and the only public report of the case appears in The Times newspaper (9 September 1998). Professor Adrian Briggs of Oxford University has described that omission as "a disgrace". A full copy of the original judgment, initialled by Justice Moses, is here. However, by 5 May 2020, the judgement had made its way onto BAILLI, as had a preliminary hearing relating to disclosure.

== Background ==
The ducal family of Saxe-Coburg-Gotha began to buy paintings in 1656. The Joachim Wtewael painting The Holy Family with Saints John and Elizabeth, the painting involved in the case, was featured in an 1826 catalogue of the family's paintings. In July 1905 an act was created declaring that the art collection was part of the estate of the Duke. On 9 November 1918 the workers' and soldiers' council of Gotha deposed of the Duke and the estate was voluntarily dissolved. In November 1927, by an agreement between the Duke and Land of Thuringia the Duke of Saxe-Coburg-Gotha, the Foundation for Art and Science (Art Foundation) was created with the purpose of preserving the art collection. The most valuable pieces of the Art Foundation were moved to safety at Reinharsbrunn at the start of the Second World War.

Saxe-Coburg Gotha

After the Second World War, the painting left the collection of the ducal family of Saxe-Coburg-Gotha in the city of Gotha. In the 1980s, the painting was arranged to be sold by two art smugglers, Makhin and Greshnikov, to a man named Furst. They arranged the smuggling of the painting from Moscow to West Berlin by Mrs. Dikeni, the wife of the Togo Ambassador in Moscow. She was supposed to deliver the painting to Furst, but did not; and it ended up in the hands of a man named Rohde. The painting was then acquired by Mina Breslav in 1988 and received by Sotheby's on 29 November 1988. The painting was offered for sale and bought by Cobert in March 1989.

== Procedural history ==
The case was a consolidation between an action brought by the City of Gotha against Sotheby's and an action brought by Federal Republic of Germany against Cobert Finance S.A. The Federal Republic of Germany and the city of Gotha both claim ownership of the painting and claim that Cobert converted the painting by "taking constructive delivery of it March 1989, by consigning it to Sotheby's for sale at that time, by offering it for sale through Sotheby's to the City of Gotha in October 1991 and/or by demanding its return from Sotheby's in August 1993".

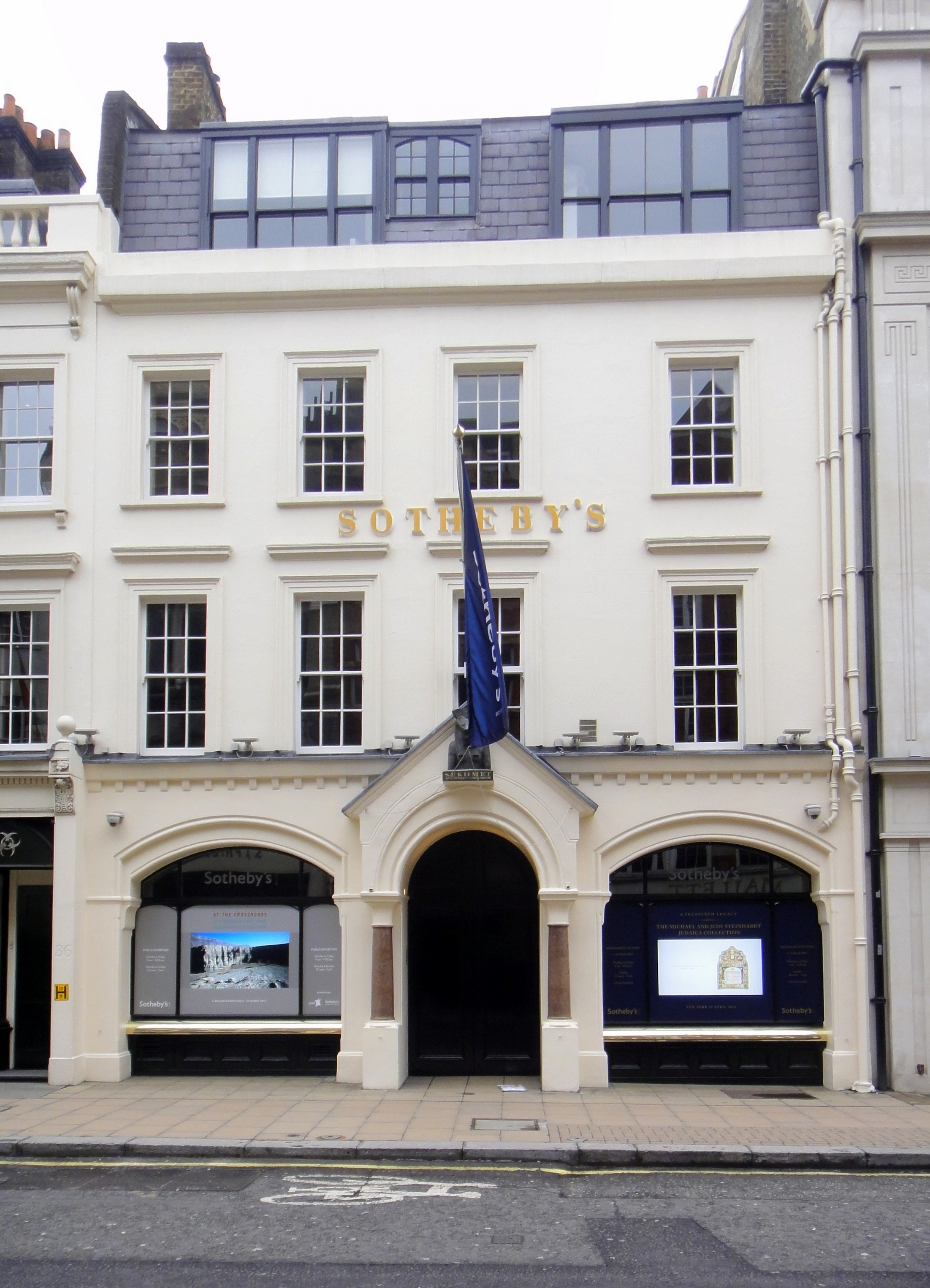
Sotheby's London

== Issues in the case ==
1. Whether the Federal Republic of Germany can establish title to the painting and

Region of Thuringia

2. Whether if it can, its claim is time-barred under the German law of limitation

For the first question to be answered it is needed to find:

1.1 Whether as a matter of fact, it can be established that the painting was in Thuringia in 1945 and 1946;

1.2 Whether title to the painting passed to the Land of Thuringia by virtue of the confiscation police order of 6 July 1945, read with the expropriation Law of 9 October 1945 or, if the painting was still in Thuringia in July 1946, by the operation of the Law of 24 July 1946;

1.3 Whether title to the painting passed to the Land of Thuringia by virtue of the dissolution of the Art Foundation on 14 October 1950;

1.4 Whether an English Court will recognize or enforce the Federal Republic of Germany's title to the painting under German law;

1.5 Whether the arrival of the painting in West Berlin, allegedly via East Germany in 1987 perfects an inchoate expropriation;

1.6 Whether the City of Gotha has a right to possession of the painting.

For the second question to be answered it is needed to find:

2.1 Whether as a matter of fact the painting was misappropriated by a subsequent possessor after it had been stolen from Gotha;

2.2 Whether the German limitation period is relevant pursuant to Section 1 of the Foreign Limitation Periods Act 1984;

2.3 Whether, if German law is relevant, the right to recover is statute-barred under German law;

2.4 Whether pursuant to Section 2 (1) of the Foreign Limitation Periods Act 1984, the judge should disapply German law, if it bars the claim, on the grounds that it conflicts with English public policy.

=== 1.1 The Location of the Painting in 1945 and 1946 ===
To establish ownership of the painting, it is necessary to rely on laws which only had effect within the region of Thuringia or other territory that the Soviet Military Administration had jurisdiction over. The judge found that the most likely time that the painting was taken, was during the Soviet trophy brigades under Major Alexeyev, when the brigades raided the museum in January 1946. By July 1946 it was confirmed that the painting was gone.

=== 1.2 Approach to Foreign Law ===
==== Law Applicable to the Transfer of Title to the Painting ====
The judge found that he was required to apply German domestic law as "the validity of a transfer of a tangible, movable" piece of property is governed by the law of the country where it is transferred. He stated that the Federal Republic of Germany had to establish title under German law.

==== Title to the Painting under German Law ====
The determination of title is established by legislation passed between July 1945 to July 1946. This legislation concerns confiscation, sequestration and expropriation of property within the area. It is only laws relating to expropriation which have the effect of depriving an owner of title.

===== Law of 6 July 1945 =====
The law of 6 July 1945 confiscated the assets of the house of Saxe-Coburg-Gotha. The judge found this law to be legally effective.

===== Law of 9 October 1945 =====
The Law of 9 October 1945 expropriated the assets of Art Foundation of Saxe-Coburg-Gotha which had been confiscated by the 6 July 1945 law.

===== Order No. 124 and Order No. 38 =====
Order No. 124 and Order No. 38, passed on 4 December 1945 and 24 July 1946, stated that the law of 9 October 1945 was repealed.

===== Was the Expropriation by the Law of 9 October 1945 Repealed by the Law of 4 December 1945? =====
The judge found that the expropriation of the paintings remained effective. He found that the Law of December 1945 replaced the regime previously existing under the law but did not repeal confiscations carried out before the law of October 1945.

===== Order No. 154/181 and Order No. 38 =====
Sequestered and confiscated property belonging to the Nazi party and put the assets under the authority of German administrative authorities. The orders expropriated property covered by Order No. 124 and required their delivery to the state of Thuringia.

==== Judge's Finding on Laws ====
The Judge found that if the painting was still in the jurisdiction of the Soviet military administration in July 1946 the law of July 1946 would have expropriated the painting.

=== 1.3 Dissolution of the Foundation on 14 October 1950 ===
The Minister of Justice of Thuringia attempted to dissolve the Saxe-Coburg-Gotha Art Foundation on 14 October 1950.

==== Was the Dissolution Effective to Transfer Title to the Painting to the Land? ====
Article 87 (1) of the German Civil Code states that "if the fulfillment of the object of the foundation has become impossible, or if it endangers the public interest, the competent authority may give the foundation another stated object or dissolve it". Article 88 states that on the dissolution of a foundation, the assets pass to the person specified in the constitution. The Constitution of the foundation did not specify a beneficiary. This led to claims that the failure to specify a beneficiary and the absence of a reference to the board of directors confirmed that the dissolution of the foundation was an act of expropriation.

==== Did the Property of the Art Foundation Including the Painting Situated then in the Soviet Union pass to the Land Thuringia? ====
The judge found that the dissolution of the foundation did not amount to an act of expropriation.

==== Judge's Conclusions on the Dissolution ====
The Judge found that the seat of the Art Foundation was in Gotha in 1950, that the Ministry of Justice of Thuringia was the competent authority to dissolve the foundation, that the dissolution was not an act of expropriation and that by universal succession, title to the property of the foundation passed to the land of Thuringia.

=== 1.4 Recognition or enforcement in an English Court of Federal Republic of Germany's Title to the Painting under German Law ===
Cobert brought forward the principle that English courts will not recognize a governmental act affecting private property rights when the property is situated outside the territory of that government; and that English courts will not enforce the "penal, revenue or other public laws of a foreign state"

==== Was the Dissolution a Governmental Act? ====
The judge found that the Ministry of Justice's attempt to dissolve the Art Foundation only concerned the status of the Foundation and that English law should recognise the effects of the law.

==== Is this Action an Action for the Enforcement Directly or Indirectly of a Penal Revenue or Other Public Law of a Foreign State? ====
The court found that the act of dissolution only concerned the existence of the Foundation, was not an exercise of sovereign authority, and therefore could be recognized under English law.

=== 1.5 Return of the Painting to the German Democratic Republic in 1987 ===
The Federal German Republic contended that the painting would have entered the German Democratic Republic in 1987 on its way to West Berlin. The judge found as there was no evidence relating to how the painting entered West Berlin, this was irrelevant.

=== 1.6 City of Gotha's Claim to Possession ===
The Judge found that the city of Gotha had no claim to possession; and if the Federal German Republic's claim had failed, the city's claim would fail as well. The location of the painting within Gotha does not establish a legal right of the city for possession. The only legal claim to possession would be the assignment of the museum to the city in 1952, but the painting had left the city earlier than that date.

=== Answer to First Question ===
The court found that the Federal German Republic had title to the painting.

=== 2.1 Facts Relating to Limitation; the Arrival of the Painting in West Berlin from Moscow, 1987-1989 ===
There was an issue of whether the painting had been misappropriated by Mrs. Dikeni or Rohde.

==== Finding of Fact as to Misappropriation ====
The judge looked at various witness testimonies, but questioned their credibility due to their involvement in criminal activities. The judge found that after the painting was given to Mrs. Dikeni, it was not returned; and that Mrs. Dikeni misappropriated the painting in 1987.

=== 2.2 Is the German Limitation Period Relevant? ===
The period of limitation only starts when the painting is purchased in good faith

The Foreign Limitations Periods Act 1984 Section 1 states:

(1) Subject to the following provisions of this Act, where in any action or proceedings in a court in England and Wales, the law of any other country falls to be taken into account in the determination of any matter

a) the law of that other country relating to limitation shall apply in respect of that matter for the purposes of the action or proceedings; and

b)except where the matter falls within subsection (2) below, the law of England and Wales relating to limitation shall not so apply

(2) A matter falls within this subsection if it is a matter in the determination of which both the law of England and Wales and the law of some other country fall to be taken into account

The judge found that the laws of both Germany and England are applicable and Section 1 (2) of the Act applies.

=== 2.3 Limitation under German Law ===
The judge found that under German law:

- the right to recovery is statute-barred after a period of thirty years
- no title is transferred to the person in possession by the expiry of the limitation period of thirty years
- the limitation period begins when the claim arises
- the thirty-year period continued to apply even when the painting was outside Germany, within the Soviet Union
- time runs irrespective of whether the claimant is aware of the existence of the claim or the identity of his opponent
- a new claim for recovery arises against each new possessor

The contention depends on article 221 of the German Civil Code which states:

If a thing, with regard to which a claim in rem exists, comes by succession into the possession of a third party, the time of prescription which elapsed during the time of possession by the predecessor in title is reckoned in favor of the successor in title

If article 221 is applicable, the last possessor gains all periods of limitation expired by previous possessors.

Professor Siehr alleged that the 30 year limitation period had not expired because

1 Article 221 does not apply to a transfer between a bailor to a bailee; and

2 Article 221 does not have effect where a direct possessor misappropriates the asset

==== The Application of Article 221 to a Transfer from Bailor to Bailee ====
A bailee is someone in direct possession, and a bailor after possession is in indirect possession. The judge found that both bailee and bailor could rely upon the limitation period.

==== Subsequent Misappropriation by the Succeeding Possessor ====
The judge found that if a bailee misappropriates an asset the limitation period which had elapsed is restarted, as the chain of non-proprietary possession has been broken. He found that the limitation period started to run when Mrs. Dikeni misappropriated the painting in 1987 or by Rohde later that year.

=== 2.4 Public policy ===
The judge found that if the claim had been barred under German law, it would have been imperative to examine whether this conflicted with English public policy. The judge found that there was a policy that time was not to run in favor of the thief or a transferee who did not purchase the painting in good faith. He also found that there was no public policy which would deprive the Federal Republic of Germany of the benefits of the German limitation laws; and that this could not be done simply because the application of English laws would lead to different results.

=== Answer to Second Question ===
The judge found that the German limitation period of 30 years had not expired at the time of the claim.

== Findings ==
1.1 The painting was taken from Thuringia in January 1946

1.2 Title passed to the land Thuringia by virtue of the law of 9 October 1945, the expropriation effect of which was not repealed by the law of 4 December 1945

1.3 Had not title passed in 1945 it would have passed to the land by virtue of the dissolution of the Art Foundation 14 October 1950

1.4 English Courts will recognize and enforce the Federal Republic of Germany's title to the painting, whether derived from the law of October 1945 or the dissolution in 1950

1.5 It has not been proved that the painting entered the territory of the German Democratic Republic in 1987

1.6 The city of Gotha cannot claim possession of the painting

2.1 The painting was misappropriated in 1987

2.2 The German law limitation period is relevant

2.3 The claim is not statute-barred under German law

2.4 Had the claim been time-barred, German law conflicts with public policy

== Reception ==
The case has been subsequently cited in several English judicial decisions, including:

- Iran v Barakat Galleries Ltd [2007] EWCA Civ 1374 at para [104]
- USP Strategies Plc and Another v London General Holdings Ltd [2004] EWHC 373 (Ch)
