= Crypta Neapolitana =

Ancient Roman road tunnel in Naples, Italy

Coordinates: 40°49′47″N 14°13′03″E

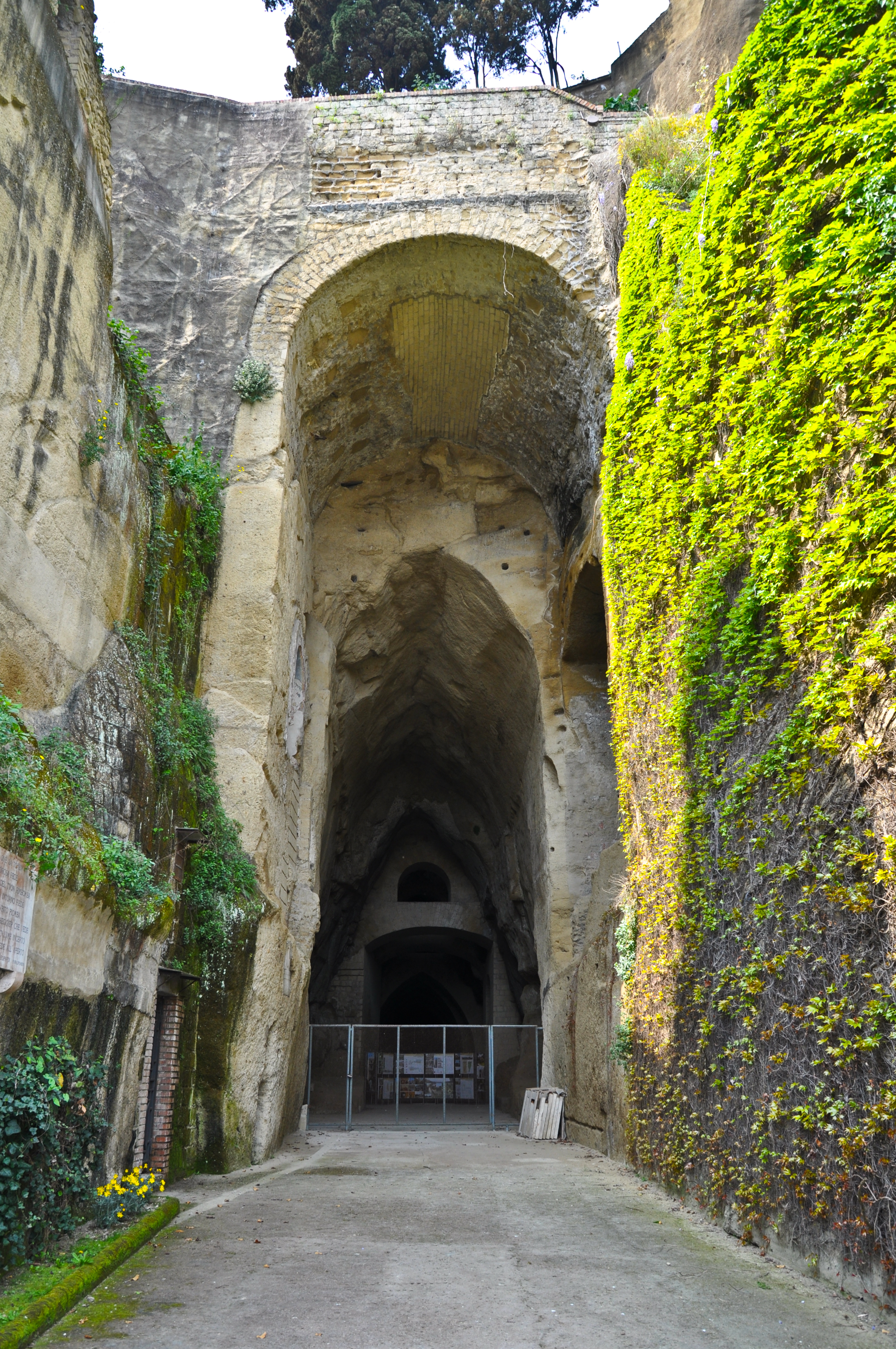
Entrance to the Crypta Neapolitana from the Naples side.

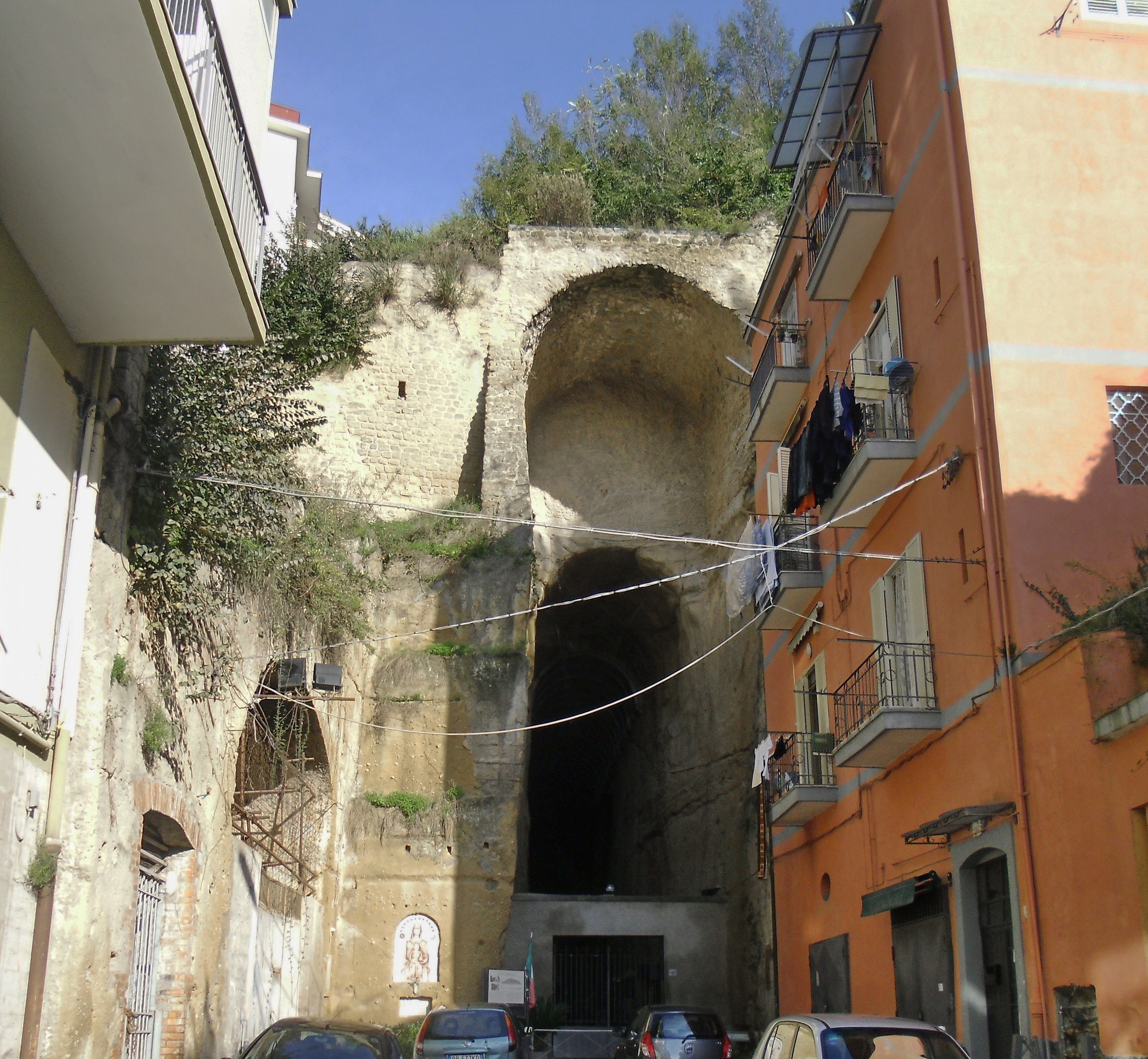
Western, Fuorigrotta end

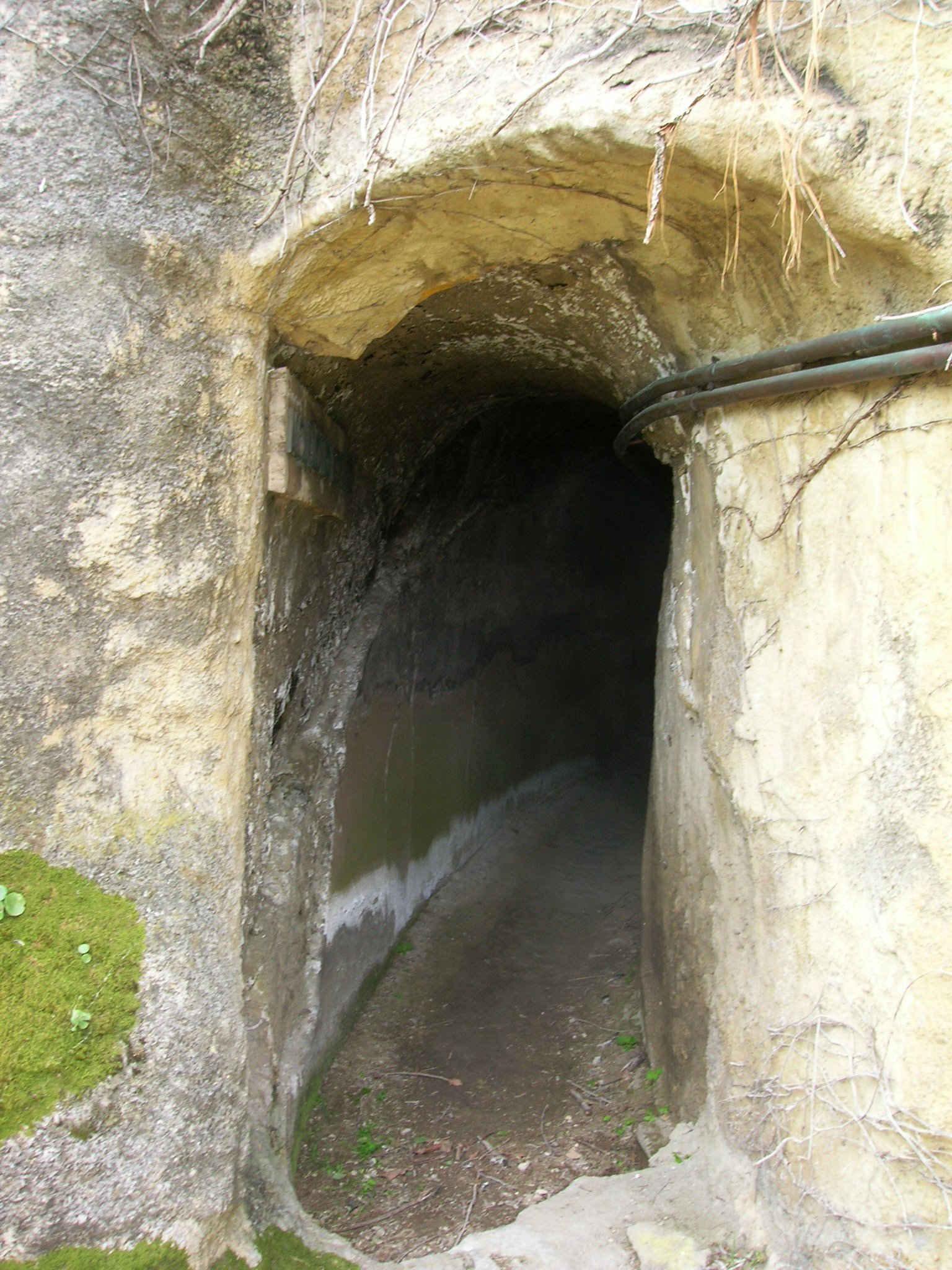
Serino Aqueduct entrance

The Crypta Neapolitana (Latin for "Neapolitan crypt") is an ancient Roman road tunnel near Naples, Italy. It was built in 37 BC and is over 700 metres long.

The tunnel connected Naples with the so-called Phlegrean Fields and the town of Pozzuoli along the road known as the via Domiziana.

== Geography ==
The eastern entrance (on the Naples side) lies in the Vergiliano park of Piedigrotta ("at the foot of the grotta"); the western end is in the area now called Fuorigrotta ("outside the grotta").

The site is also noteworthy for the presence of the so-called Virgil's tomb, as well as the tomb of the Italian poet Giacomo Leopardi.

== History ==
Naples and Pozzuoli were separated by a great impenetrable marsh: the first road between the two cities was probably built by the Greeks and was narrow and indirect.

The first Roman road connecting Neapolis and the Phlegrean fields, the via (Antiniana) per colles, was built at the beginning of the 1st century BC and followed the easiest route but it was nevertheless still long, difficult, tortuous and traversed steep hills. It climbed the hills of Vomero and came back down towards Fuorigrotta arriving at the modern Via Terracina from where it continued to the ports of Puteoli and Cumae. As Puteoli and associated trade between the two cities grew, the old road needed to be improved, so the tunnel shortened the route and avoided several hills.

The tunnel was first built by the architect Lucius Cocceius Auctus for Agrippa during the civil war between Octavian and Sextus Pompeius in c. 37 BC. The new road, called via per cryptam, turned north at the west end of the tunnel, heading towards Via Leopardi and reconnecting with the old road, the via Neapolis-Puteoli, at the top of Via Terracina where a way-station (tabernae) and adjoining thermal spa complex has been excavated.

The tunnel is one of four road tunnels built in the area by Cocceius: others are the Grotta di Seiano (tunnel of Sejanus) in Posillipo, the Grotta di Cocceio from Lake Avernus to Cumae, and the Crypta Romana from Cumae to its port, as part of a network of military infrastructures including construction of the Portus Julius.

The Aqua Augusta (Serino) aqueduct was built later in parallel to the road tunnel.

The tunnel was still in use as a roadway until superseded by two modern tunnels in the early 20th century, and shows extensive restoration done by the architects of the Bourbon dynasty of Naples. During the Second World War it was used as a bomb shelter for the inhabitants of Bagnoli; the war and some landslides during the fifties put it back into a state of neglect. Today it has been restored as an archaeological site.

According to mediaeval legend, the tunnel was built by the poet Virgil in a single night.
