= Avernus =

Ancient name for a volcanic crater near Cumae (Cuma), Italy

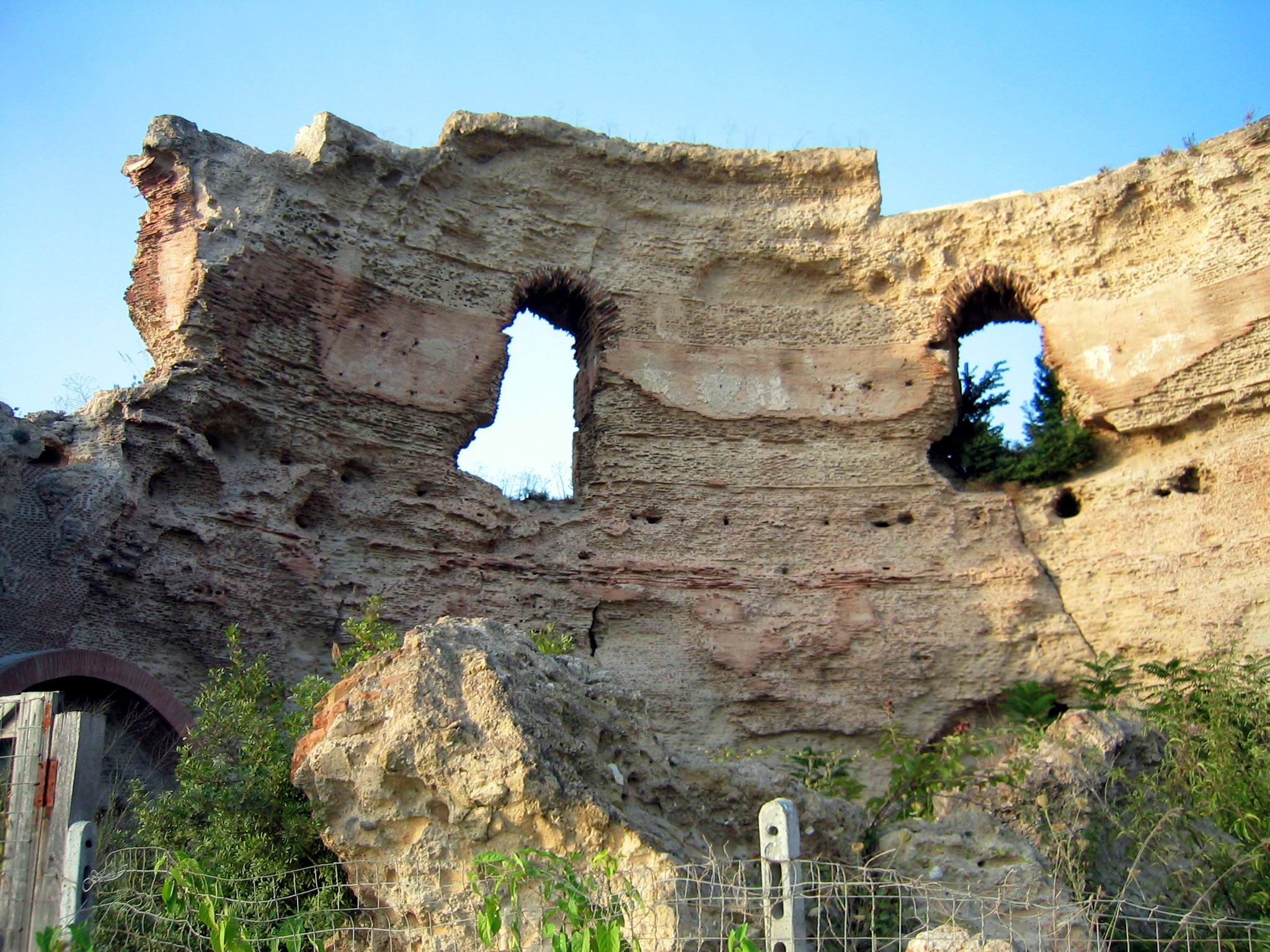
Ruins of temple to Apollo, Avernus

Avernus was an ancient name for a volcanic crater near Cumae (Cuma), Italy, in the region of Campania west of Naples. Part of the Phlegraean Fields of volcanoes, Avernus is approximately 3.2 kilometres (2.0 mi) in circumference. Within the crater is Lake Avernus (Lago d'Averno).

== Role in ancient Roman society ==
Avernus was believed to be the entrance to the underworld, and is portrayed as such in the Aeneid of Virgil. According to tradition, all birds flying over the lake were destined to fall dead, hence the lake’s name was transferred to Greek as Ἄορνος (λίμνη) Áornos (límnē)‚ or 'birdless (lake)'. This was likely due to the toxic fumes that the mouths of the crater gave off into the atmosphere. In later times, the word was simply an alternative name for the underworld.

On the shores of the lake is the grotto of the Cumaean Sibyl and the entrance to a long tunnel (Grotta di Cocceio, c. 800 metres (2,600 ft)) leading toward Cumae, where her sanctuary was located. There are also the remains of temples to Apollo and Jupiter. During the civil war between Octavian and Antony, Agrippa tried to turn the lake into a military port, the Portus Julius. A waterway was dug from Lake Lucrino to Avernus to this end. The port's remains may still be seen under the lake's surface.

Avernus was also regarded as a divine being. The 4th-5th century writer Servius the Grammarian described a statue of Avernus, which perspired during the storm after the union of Lake Avernus and Lucrinus Lacus, and to which expiatory sacrifices were offered.

== Averni ==
The term avernus (plural averni) was also used by ancient naturalists for certain lakes, grottos, and other places which infect the air with poisonous steams or vapors. The Cave of Dogs in Italy was a famous example. The most celebrated of these, however, is Lake Avernus.

They were also called mephites. Mephitis was the Roman goddess of noxious vapors who protected against malaria. The adjective 'mephitic' means 'foul-smelling' or 'malodorous'.

== See also ==
- Ploutonion, 'grotto of Plouton', a Greek term for a mephitic sanctuary
- Yomotsu Hirasaka
