= Aristodemus of Cumae =

Tyrant of Cumae, Magna Graecia (c.550–c.490 BC)

Aristodemus (Greek: Ἀριστόδημος; c. 550 – c. 490 BC), nicknamed Malakos (meaning "soft" or "malleable" or possibly "effeminate"), was a strategos and then tyrant of Cumae in Magna Graecia. As a strategos, he twice defeated Etruscan armies. He gained popularity amongst the people of Cumae due to his opposition to the city's aristocracy and his proposals to more fairly share land and to forgive debts. He was eventually successful in overthrowing the aristocratic faction and became tyrant. He was assassinated by the aristocratic faction around 490 BC.

== Life ==
Born to a distinguished family in Cumae, Aristodemus was appointed a strategos. In this role, he defeated Etruscan armies in 524 BC, and again in 508 BC in the Battle of Aricia.

Having gained the favor of the people, Aristodemus then made himself tyrant of Cumae, and was said to have arranged for many of the nobles to be put to death or sent into exile. He secured power by surrounding himself with a strong bodyguard and by recruiting mercenaries. Aristodemus had a major influence on the political and social life of the city. He compelled the male descendants of the exiled nobles to be raised in the countryside as if they were slaves. Then, in order to de-politicize the common male youth in the city,

he ordered the boys to wear their hair long like the girls, to adorn it with flowers, to keep it curled and to bind up the tresses with hair-nets, to wear embroidered robes that reached down to their feet, and, over these, thin and soft mantles, and to pass their lives in the shade.

Plutarch agrees that the remaining male youth in the city were forced by law to dress in a feminine manner, and adds that Aristodemus compelled girls "to bob their hair and to wear boy's clothes and the short undergarment."

After the Battle of Lake Regillus (499 or 496 BC), the exiled former king of Rome, Lucius Tarquinius Superbus, took refuge at his court, where he died in 495 BC. Livy records that Aristodemus became Tarquinius' heir, and in 492 BC, when Roman envoys travelled to Cumae to purchase grain, Aristodemus seized the envoys' vessels in response to the Roman seizure the property of Tarquinius at the time of his exile.

Around 490 BC the exiled nobles and their sons, supported by Campanians and mercenaries, were able to take possession of Cumae and exact vengeance on Aristodemus and his family.
