= Via Domiziana =

Road in Campania

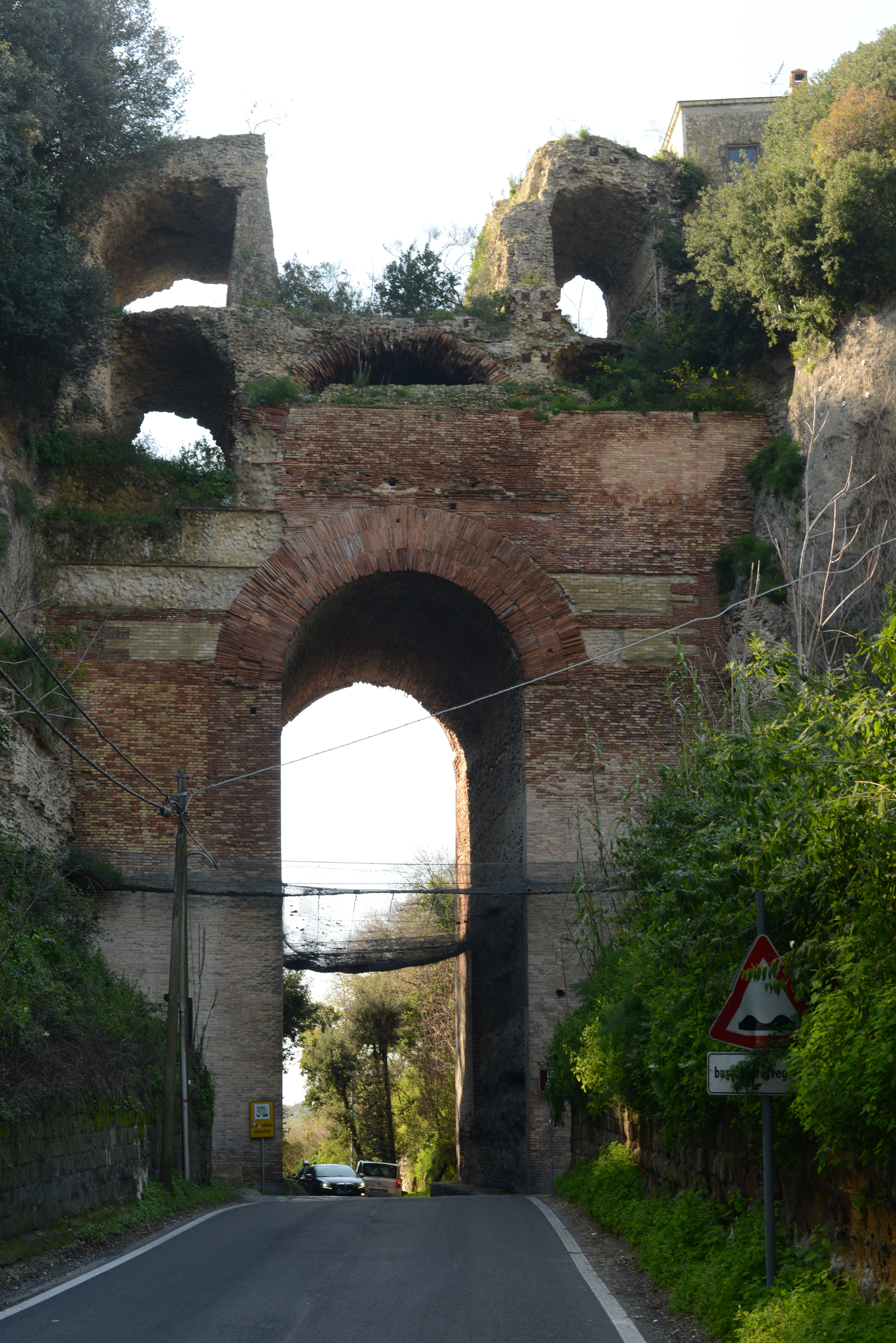
Via Domitiana through the Arco Felice in Cumae

The via Domitiana is not to be confused with the similar-sounding via Domitia in France.

Via Domiziana is the modern name for the Via Domitiana in the Campania region of Italy, a major Roman road built in 95 AD under (and named for) the emperor, Domitian, to facilitate access to and from the important ports of Puteoli (modern Pozzuoli) and Portus Julius (home port of the western Imperial fleet, consisting of the waters around Baiae and Cape Misenum) in the Gulf of Naples.

The Via Domitiana was not built from scratch, but was based on an existing road and it also used works undertaken in the Neronian period for the construction of the Fossa Neronis (the canal intended to connect Rome to Pozzuoli).

The road left the Appian Way at Formiae or Sinuessa. It followed the coast and crossed the rivers Savona and Volturna, passed through an area of coastal lagoons by Linterne and Cumae and ended in Pozzuoli. In 102 Trajan extended the Via Domitiana to Naples.

It was damaged by Alaric in 420 AD and ultimately destroyed by Gaiseric in 455 AD. It was partially restored under various rulers of the Kingdom of Naples in the Middle Ages and in its modern guise is a major coast road leading north from Naples.

Statius wrote an entire poem on the theme of Via Domitiana. He recalled the progress made by the new road and praised the Emperor. The poem is also an interesting testimony on the construction of roads under the Roman Empire.
