= Grotta di Cocceio =

Ancient Roman road tunnel

Coordinates: 40°50′24″N 14°04′14″E

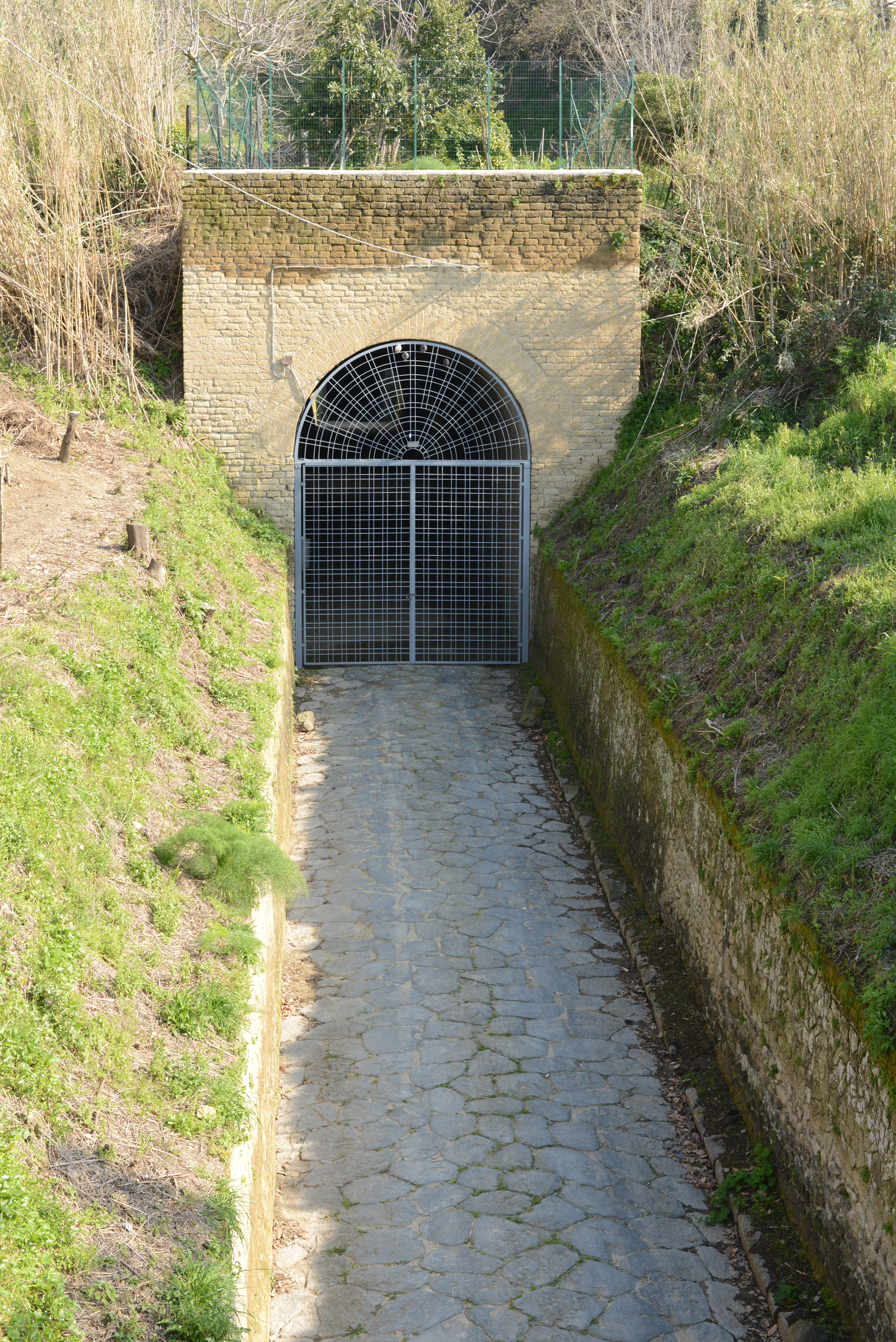
Grotta di Cocceio – Cumae-side entrance (via Arco Felice Vecchio, Pozzuoli)

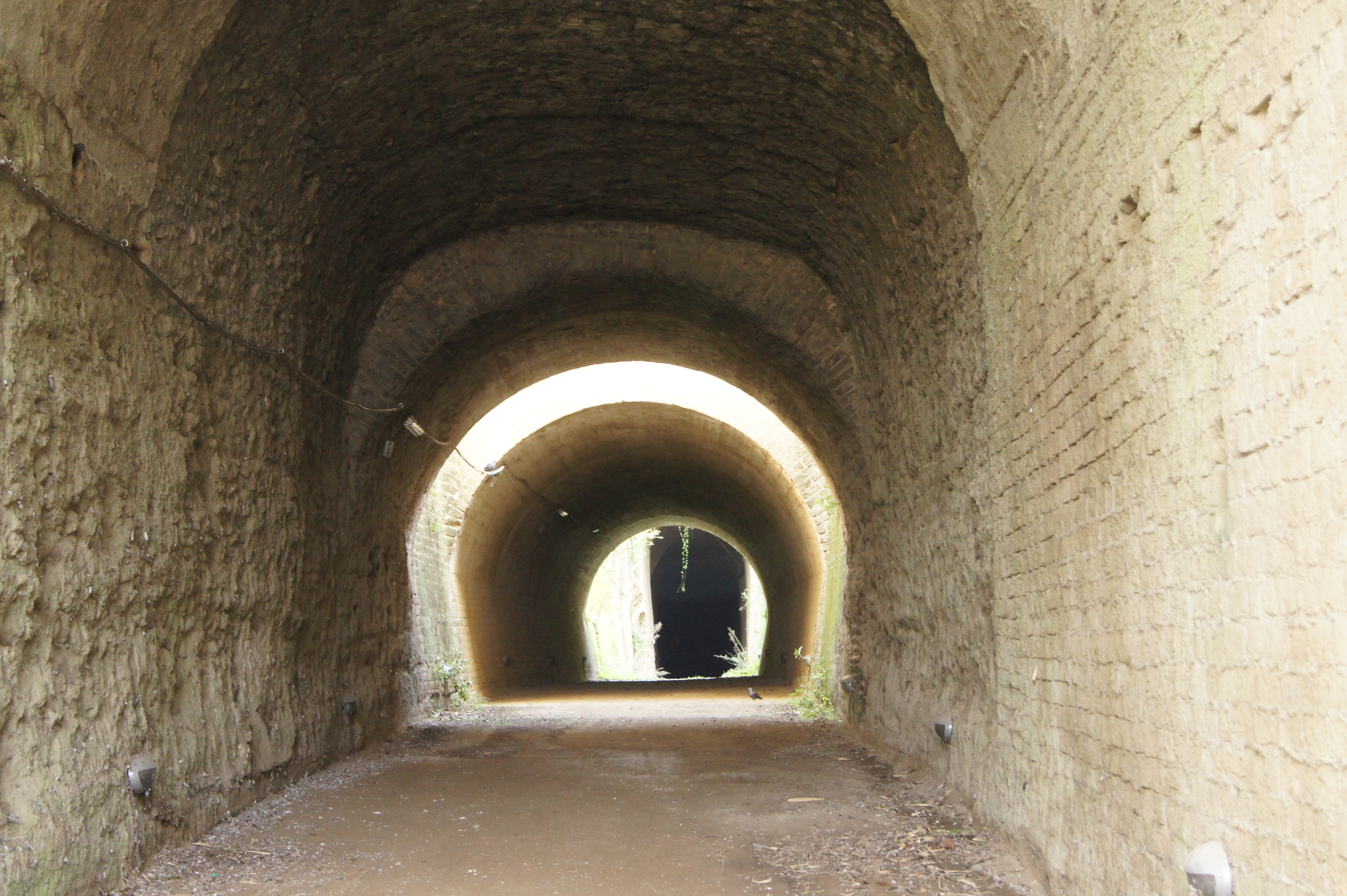
Interior of Grotta di Cocceio

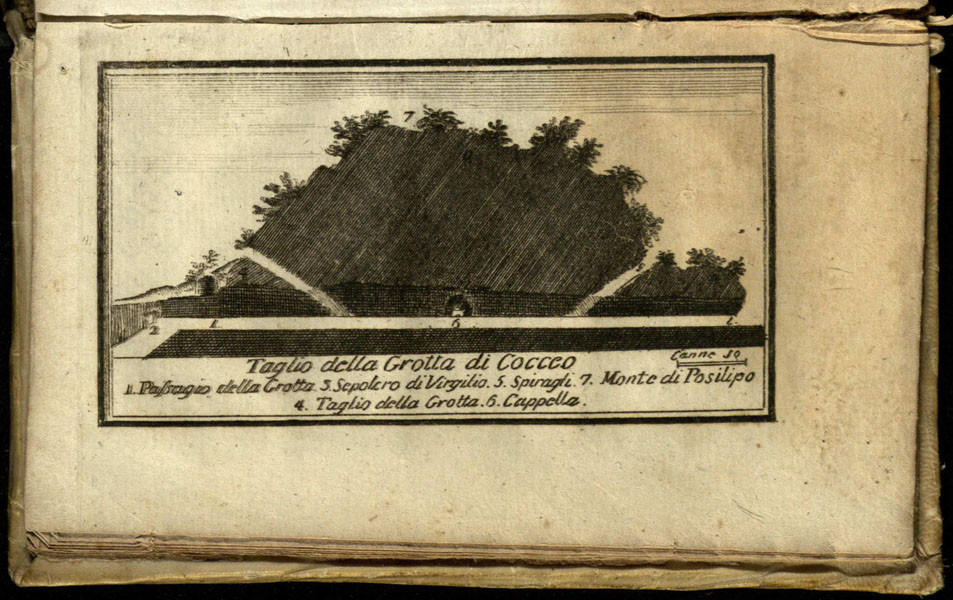
Grotta di Cocceio, drawing from Pompeo Sarnelli's La guida de’ forestieri curiosi di vedere… (1769)

The Grotta di Cocceio (Cocceius' Tunnel) is an ancient Roman tunnel nearly a kilometre in length connecting Lake Avernus with Cumae and dating from 38-36 BC. It was burrowed through the tuff stone of Monte Grillo by the architect Lucius Cocceius Auctus at the command of Agrippa who was in the process of converting the Lake into a military port, the Portus Julius.

The tunnel was wide enough to allow the passage of two wagons. The Avernus side of the passage was decorated with a colonnade and had many statues in niches hewn into the tuff walls of the entrance. Light and air were provided by six vertical shafts dug into the hill (the longest of which was over thirty metres high)

The Aqua Augusta aqueduct supplying the port was dug in a tunnel parallel to and on the northern side the road and was also equipped with niches and vertical shafts.

The Crypta Romana tunnel was also built nearby from Cumae to its port in the same period, as well as other tunnels in the vicinity (e.g. the Crypta Neapolitana).

With the end of the civil war between Octavian and Mark Antony in 31 BC and the displacement of the fleet from Portus Julius to the port of Misenum in 12 BC, the tunnels lost their strategic interest, but continued to be useful for practical and commercial reasons.

The tunnel is also known as the Grotta della Pace, in reference to a Spanish captain, Pietro de Pace, who made use of the tunnel in 1508–1509 to plunder the ruins of Cumae, which, at the time, still bore many rich items.

The Grotta was heavily damaged during World War II and is no longer open to the public.

It has undergone extensive restoration works in recent years (up to 2017) and should be reopened in the near future. However, colonies of five species of legally-protected bats were discovered during the restoration, making an environmental assessment necessary before the reopening can go through.
