= War between Clusium and Aricia =

Military conflict in central Italy in around 508 BC

The war between Clusium and Aricia was a military conflict in central Italy that took place around 508 BC.

Lars Porsena was king of Clusium, at that time reputed to be one of the most powerful cities in Etruria. Earlier in 508 he had besieged the new Roman Republic, at the behest of the exiled king Lucius Tarquinius Superbus. Upon the establishment of a peace treaty between Rome and Clusium, Porsena lifted his siege and departed.

Porsena then split his forces, and sent part of the Clusian army with his son Aruns to besiege the Latin city of Aricia. According to Livy, Porsena did this so that his military expedition might not appear to have been fruitless.

The Aricians sent for assistance from the Latin League, and also from the Greek city of Cumae. When support arrived, the Arician army ventured beyond the walls of the city and the combined armies met the Clusian forces in battle. According to Livy, the Clusians initially routed the Arician forces, but the Cumaean troops allowed the Clusians to pass by, then attacked them from the rear, gaining victory against the Clusians. Livy says the Clusian army was destroyed.

The Clusian survivors are reported by Livy to have fled to Rome, as supplicants, and were allowed a district in the city to settle, which later became known as the Vicus Tuscus.

== Chronology ==
In Roman tradition, the battle of Aricia happened around the fourth year of the Roman Republic, when Spurius Larcius and Titus Herminius were consuls. The precise year of the battle varies in the sources: the historian Livy has 508 BC, and the antiquarian Dionysius of Halicarnassus (5.36), using Greek Olympiads, dated the events to 504 BC, while the traditional Varronian chronology has Larcius and Herminius as consuls in 506 BC. Dionysius narrates the conflict from the point of view of Cumae and its tyrant, Aristodemus, which has led Andreas Alföldi and other historians to believe that he used an independent Cumaean source instead of a Roman one. If true, this "Cumaean chronicle" (as it has been termed) provides an independent confirmation of the general accuracy of traditional Roman chronology, which dated the beginning of the Republic to the late 6th century BC. Arnaldo Momigliano wrote, "this synchronism with the history of Cumae is the strongest single argument for the correctness of Roman republican chronology'.

Alföldi's argument has been attacked by Andrew Gallia, who argues that there was no contemporary writing or tradition behind the Cumaean point of view in the conflict, and that Dionysius's date for the battle of Aricia should not be regarded as more accurate than Livy's. Wiseman was unconvinced by Gallia's arguments and accepted the existence of a Cumaean chronicle narrating the historical period in question.
