= Cocceius Auctus =

Roman architect

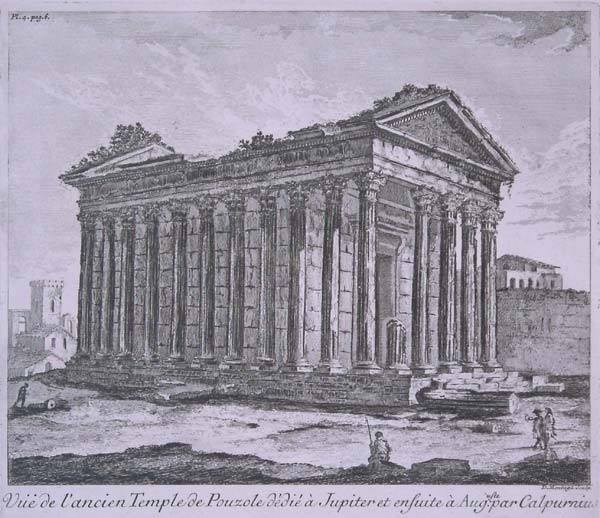
Temple of Augustus in Pozzuoli

Lucius Cocceius Auctus (1st century BC and 1st century AD) was a Roman architect employed by Octavian's strategist (and intended successor) Agrippa to excavate the subterranean passageways known as the crypta neapolitana connecting modern-day Naples and Pozzuoli and the Grotta di Cocceio, connecting Lake Avernus and Cumae. Cocceius was responsible for the conversion of the Capitolium in Pozzuoli into a Temple of Augustus with the backing of the merchant Lucius Calpurnius. Cocceius Auctus also built the original Pantheon in Rome.

== See also ==
- Cocceia gens
