= Portus Julius =

Ancient harbor in Baiae, Rome

Coordinates: 40°49′42″N 14°5′41″E

Portus Julius (alternatively spelled in the Latin Iulius) was the first harbour specifically constructed to be a base for the Roman western naval fleet, the classis Misenensis. The port was located near Baiae and protected by the Misenum peninsula at the north-western end of the Gulf of Naples. Portus Julius was named in honour of Octavian's great-uncle and adoptive father, Julius Caesar and the Julian clan.

== Construction of Portus Julius ==
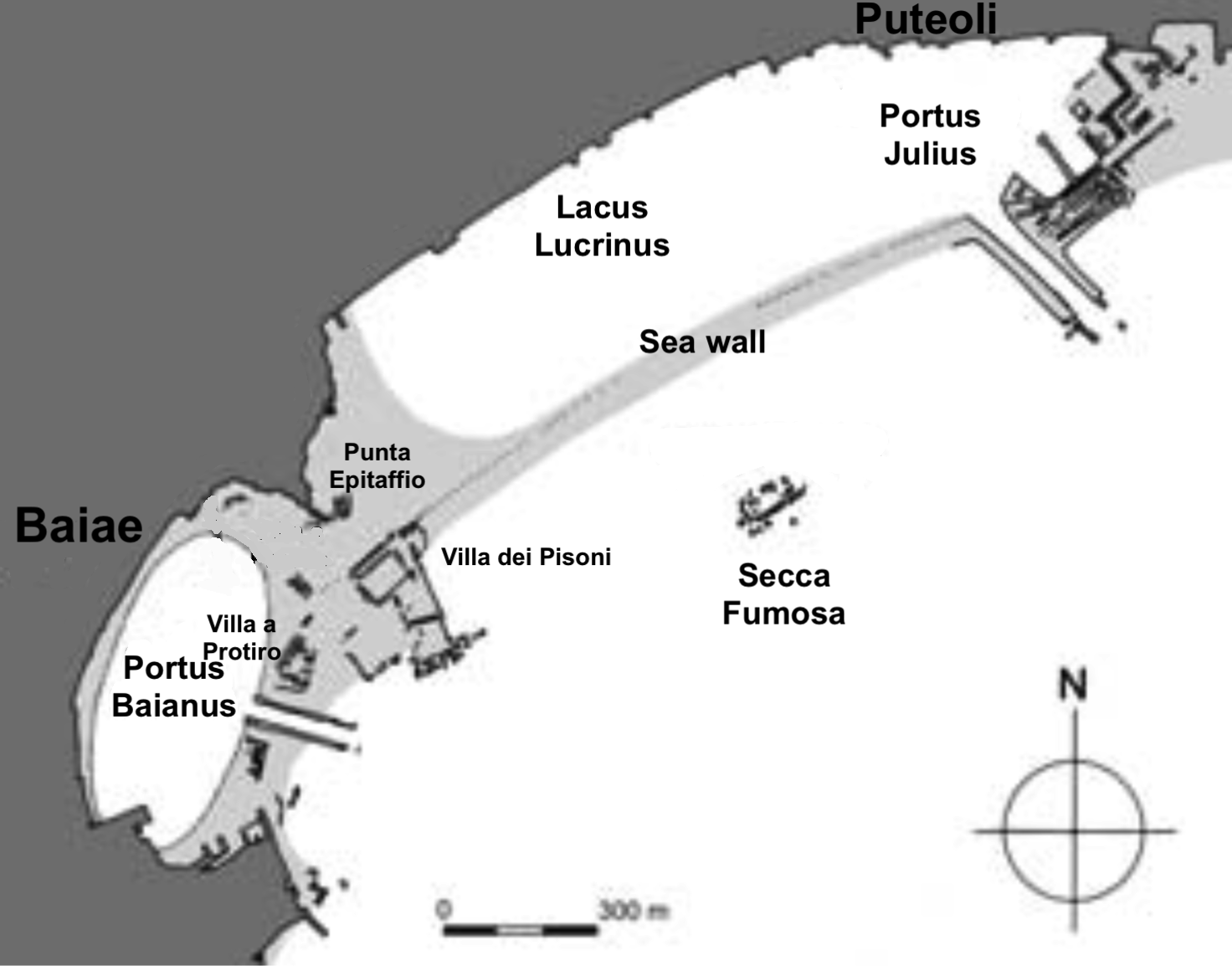
Submerged remains of harbour and buildings (grey)

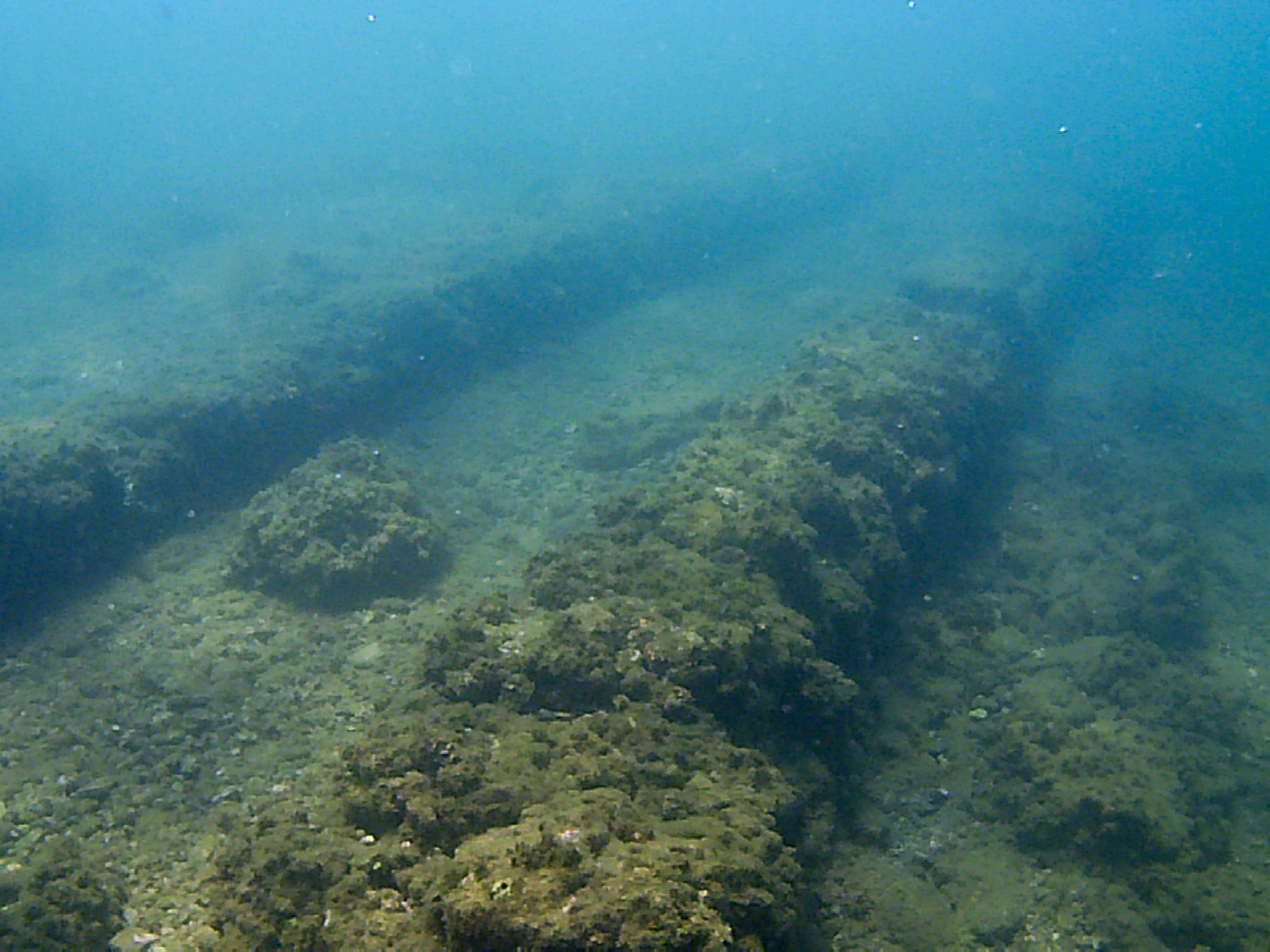
Channel into the harbour

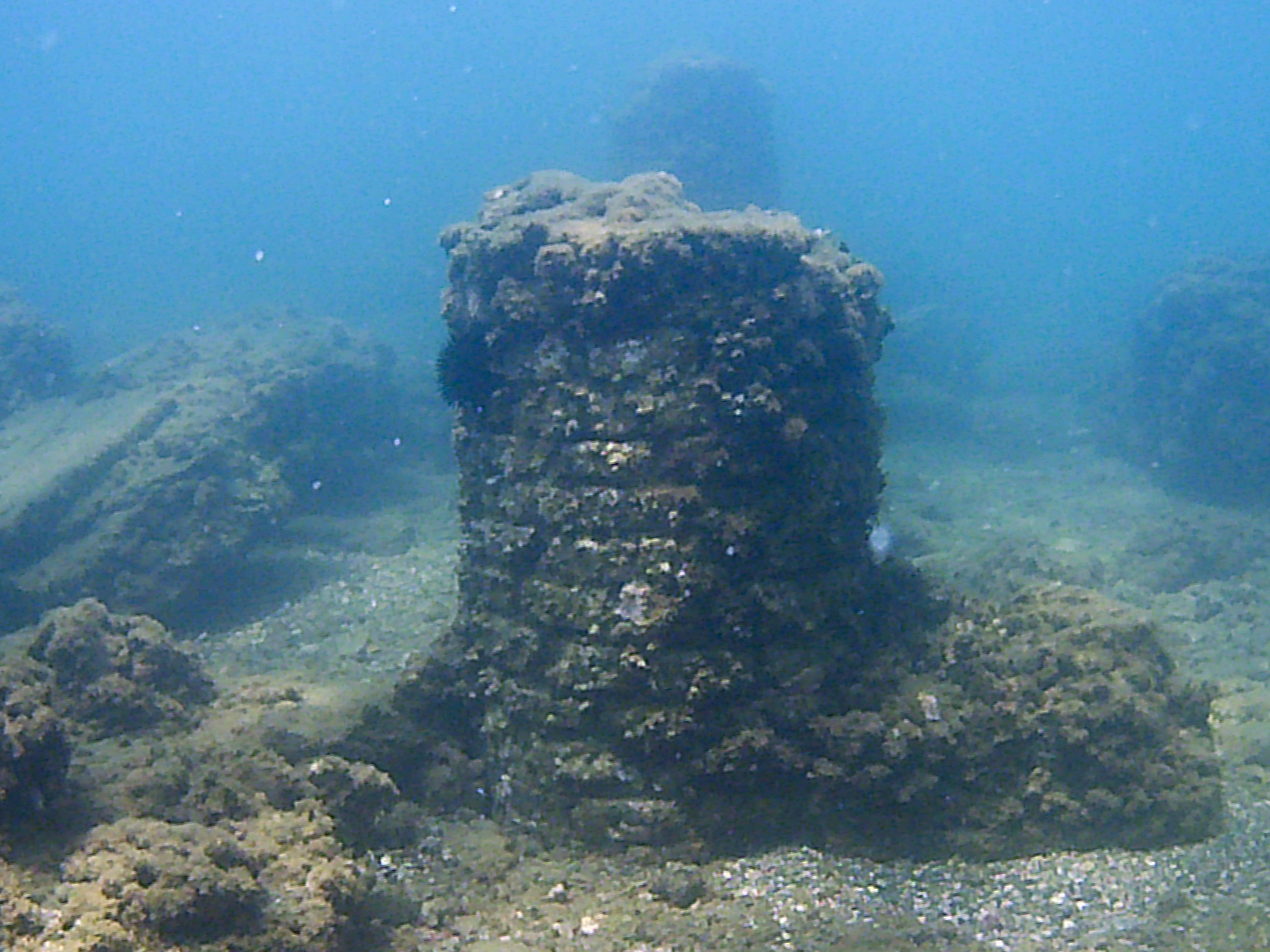
Submerged pila of the Roman harbour

During the civil wars from 39 BC after the Pact of Misenum, Octavian urgently needed a safe naval harbour in which to build and train a fleet for a campaign against Sextus Pompeius (younger son of Pompey the Great) who was making frequent raids on Italy and upon the shipping routes for Rome's grain supply. To run the operation, Octavian turned to his closest and most able associate, Marcus Agrippa and his chosen architect Cocceius.

Agrippa knew that Lake Avernus was invisible from the surrounding sea and bay waters, and reasoned that the fleet's existence there could be kept secret from Sextus' navy until it was ready to strike. Agrippa's plan, executed from 37–36 BC, was to dig a canal to connect Lake Avernus to Lucrinus Lacus (Lake Lucrino) and a second, shorter canal with a hidden entrance between Lake Lucrino and the sea. A long road access tunnel, the Grotta di Cocceio, was also dug from Lake Avernus north to the town of Cumae. The engineering challenges were enormous and the achievement momentous enough that both Virgil and Pliny mention the harbour as one of the man-made wonders of Italy.

The port was defended by a long sea wall from Punta dell'Epitaffio to Punta Caruso on the sandy edge of Lake Lucrinus and on which the Via Herculanea passed. In the wall was a channel that allowed ships to enter the Lucrino basin (and road traffic crossed over a wooden bridge). The outer harbour behind Cape Misenum may have served the active vessels of the Roman navy and provided room for training exercises, while its inner counterpart was probably designed for the reserve fleet and for repairs, and as a refuge from storms.

Agrippa's innovative strategy was validated as construction of the new fleet remained unknown to Sextus' roving fleet. When it was complete, fully outfitted and trained, Agrippa's fleet left its secret base and defeated Sextus at the Battle of Naulochus (off the north coast of Sicily), the decisive naval battle of the campaign.

== Abandonment and new harbour at Misenum ==
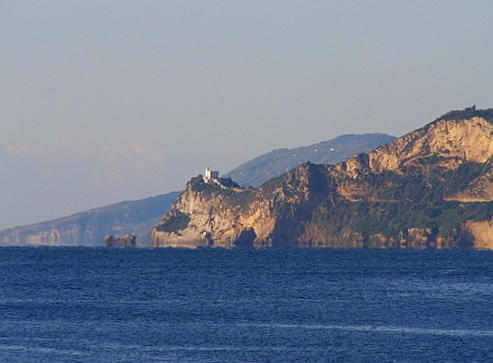
Cape Miseno

Shortly after the successful conclusion of the war with Sextus, the first Portus was abandoned, owing to accumulations of silt that compromised its navigability. With secrecy no longer a requirement, nearby Misenum became home to a second and larger version of the naval base in 12 BC. The area of the port returned to being a sacred place of infernal deities and thermal treatments, as well as a place of luxurious residences. At the end of the fifth century the breakwater of Portus Iulius became submerged due to Bradyseism.

The Romans built new breakwaters near Misenum and the base was fed by the Aqua Augusta aqueduct which also supplied Cumae, Neapolis, Pompeii and other towns around the bay.

Because of its location, the area controlled the entire Italian west coast, the islands and the Straits of Messina.

== Present state ==
The waters of original Portus Julius may still be seen today, though much smaller since one of the lakes of the Roman port, Lake Lucrino, was greatly reduced in size by the appearance of a large volcanic hill in the middle of the lake in the 16th century, a hill now called Monte Nuovo ("new mountain"), and by the sinking of the coastline.

The outer parts of the Portus are now about 5 m under the sea surface due to volcanic Bradyseism which over the centuries has caused the land to subside; some of the port may be seen from glass-bottom boats or by scuba-diving.

== See also ==
- List of Roman cisterns
- Roman navy
- Nemi ships
- Caligula's Giant Ship
- Classis Britannica
- Classis Flavia Moesica
- Classis Ravennas
