= Cumae =

Ancient Roman city near Naples, Italy

- Κύμη / Κύμαι / Κύμα (Ancient Greek); Cuma (Italian)
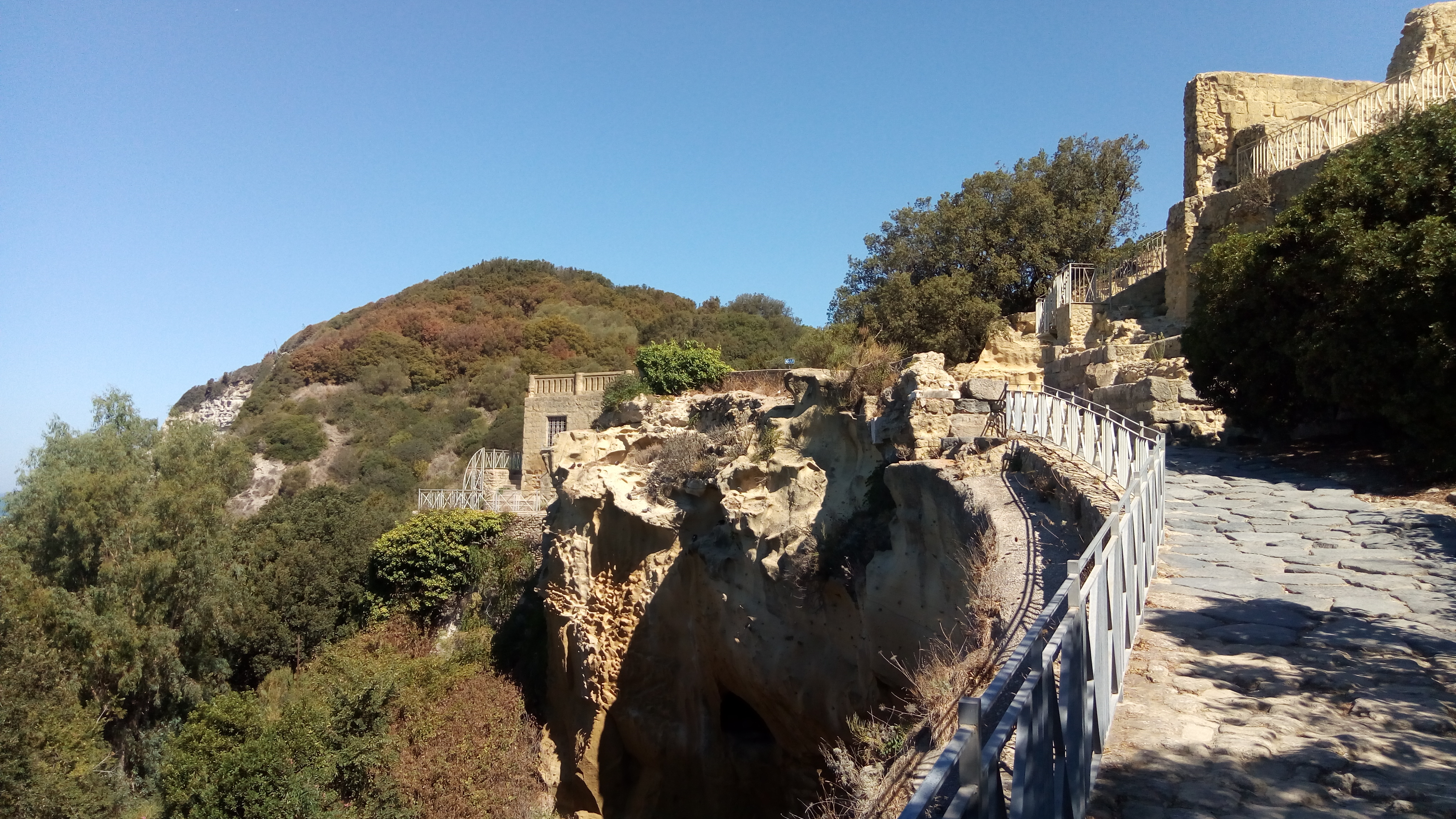
- The terrace of the Temple of Apollo

- Location within Italy Location within Campania
- 40°50′55″N 14°3′13″E
- Type: Settlement
- Periods: Archaic Greek to High Medieval
- Associated with: Cumaean Sibyl, Gaius Blossius
- Location: Cuma, Metropolitan City of Naples, Campania, Italy
- Region: Magna Graecia

History
- Built: 8th century BCE
- Built by: Colonists from Euboea
- Abandoned: 1207 AD
- Event: Battle of Cumae

Site notes
- Management: Direzione Regionale per i Beni Culturali e Paesaggistici della Campania
- Website: Sito Archeologico di Cuma (in Italian)

Cumae (/ˈkjuːmiː/ KEW-mee; Ancient Greek: Κύμη, romanized: Kúmē, or Κύμαι, Kúmai, or Κύμα, Kúma; Italian: Cuma) was the first ancient Greek colony of Magna Graecia on the mainland of Italy and was founded by settlers from Euboea in the 8th century BCE. It became a rich Roman city, the remains of which lie in and around modern Cuma, an area divided between the neighboring comuni (municipalities) of Pozzuoli and Bacoli, in the Metropolitan City of Naples, Campania. The archaeological museum of the Phlegraean Fields in the Aragonese Castle contains many finds from Cumae.

== History ==
=== Early ===
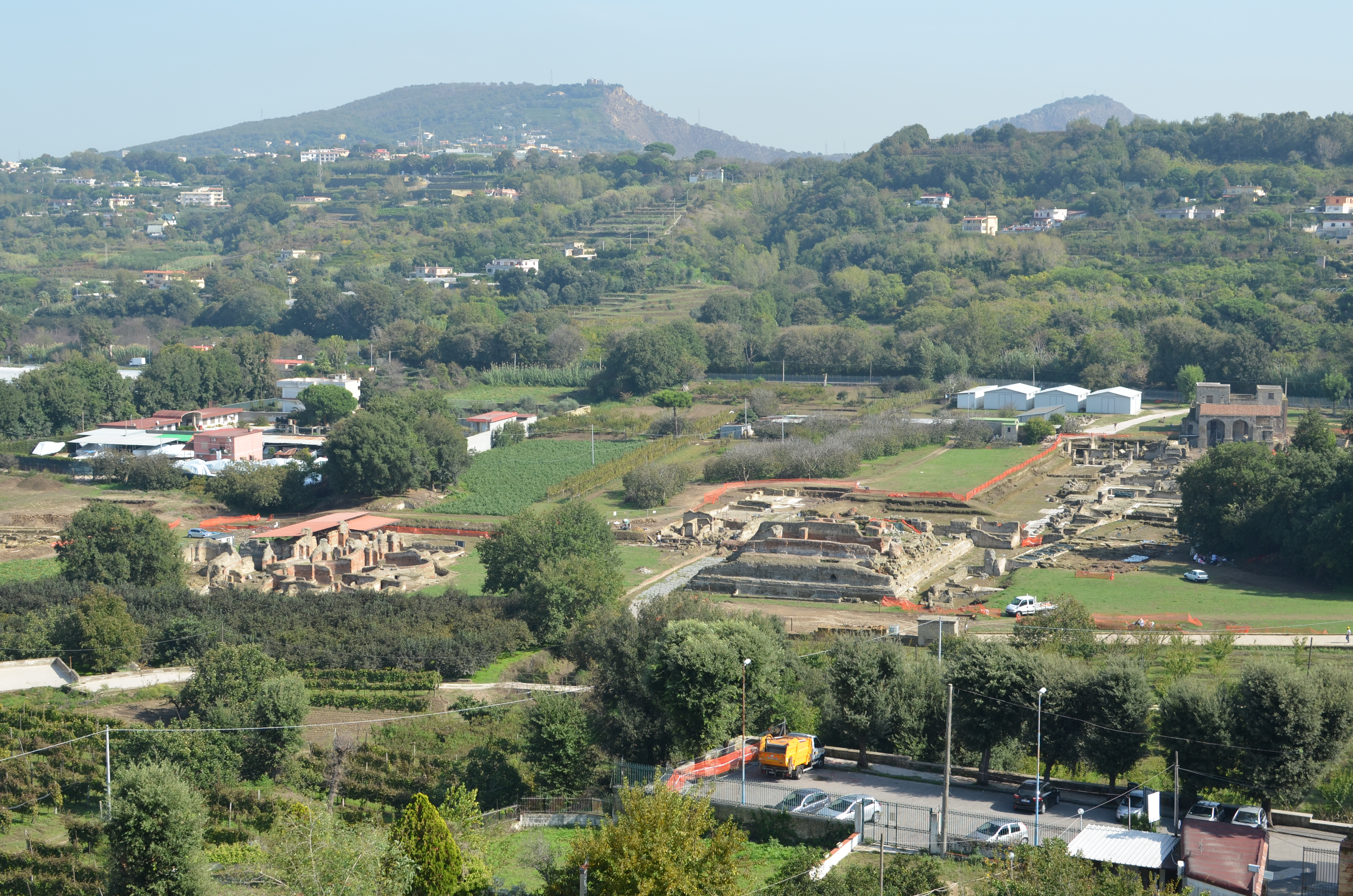
The lower city of Cumae seen from the acropolis

The oldest archaeological finds by Emilio Stevens in 1896 date to 900–850 BC (Note: Eusebius of Caesarea placed Cumae's Greek foundation at 1050 BCE; modern archaeology has not yet found the first settlers' graves, but fragments of Greek pottery c. 750-740 BCE have been excavated near the city wall.) and more recent excavations have revealed a Bronze Age settlement of the "pit-culture" people, and later dwellings of Iron Age Italic peoples whom the Greeks referred to by the names Ausones and Opici (whose land was called Opicia).

The Greek settlement was founded in the 8th century BCE by emigrants from cities of Eretria and Chalcis in Euboea, next to an Opician settlement. The Greeks were already established at nearby Pithecusae (modern Ischia) and were led to Cumae by the joint oecists (founders): Megasthenes of Chalcis and Hippocles of Cyme. (Note: Fox (2008) notes that whether the Euboeans were from the Ischian colony or freshly arrived is a moot question.)

The site chosen was on the hill and later acropolis of Monte di Cuma surrounded on one side by the sea, and on the other by particularly fertile ground on the edge of the Campanian plain. While continuing their maritime and commercial traditions, the settlers of Cumae strengthened their political and economic power by exploitation of the land and extended their territory at the expense of neighbouring peoples.

The colony thrived and in the 8th century BCE it was already strong enough to send Perieres to found Zancle in Sicily, and another group to found Tritaea in Achaea, Pausanias was told. Cuma established its dominance over almost the entire Campanian coast up to Punta Campanella over the 7th and 6th centuries BCE, gaining sway over Puteoli and Misenum.

The colony spread Greek culture in Italy and introduced a dialect of Greek, and the Euboean alphabet, a variant of which was adapted and modified by the Etruscans and then re‑adapted by the Romans and became the Latin alphabet, still used worldwide today.

According to Dionysius of Halicarnassus,

Cumae was at that time celebrated throughout all Italy for its riches, power, and all the other advantages, as it possessed the most fertile part of the Campanian plain and was mistress of the most convenient havens round about Misenum.

The growing power of the Cumaean Greeks led many indigenous tribes of the region to organise against them, notably the Dauni and Aurunci with the leadership of the Capuan Etruscans. This coalition was defeated by the Cumaeans in 524 BCE at the first Battle of Cumae under the direction of Aristodemus. The glorious victories of the colony increased its prestige, so much so that according to Diodorus Siculus, it was usual to associate the whole region of the Phlegraean Fields with Cumaean territory.

At this time the Roman Senate sent agents to Cumae to purchase grain in anticipation of a siege of Rome. Then in 505 BCE Aristodemus led a Cumaean contingent to assist the Latin city of Aricia in defeating the Etruscan forces of Clusium (see also War between Clusium and Aricia) and having attained the people's favour he overthrew the aristocratic faction and became a tyrant himself. It was probably at this point that Cumae founded Neapolis ("new city") in the late 6th century BCE.

Further contact between the Romans and the Cumaeans occurred during the reign of Aristodemus. Tarquinius, the last of the legendary Kings of Rome, lived his life in exile with Aristodemus at Cumae after the Battle of Lake Regillus and died there in 495 BCE. Livy records that Aristodemus became the heir of Tarquinius, and in 492 BCE when Roman envoys travelled to Cumae to purchase grain, Aristodemus seized the envoys' vessels on account of the property of Tarquinius which had been seized at the time of Tarquinius' exile.

Eventually, the dispossessed nobles and their sons were able to take over Cumae in 490 BCE, and executed Aristodemus.

The combined fleets of Cumae and Syracuse (on Sicily) defeated the Etruscans at the Battle of Cumae in 474 BCE.

The temple of Apollo sent the revered Sibylline Books to Rome in the 5th c. BCE. Also Rome obtained its priestesses who administered the important cult of Ceres from the temple of Demeter in Cumae.

=== Oscan and Roman Cumae ===
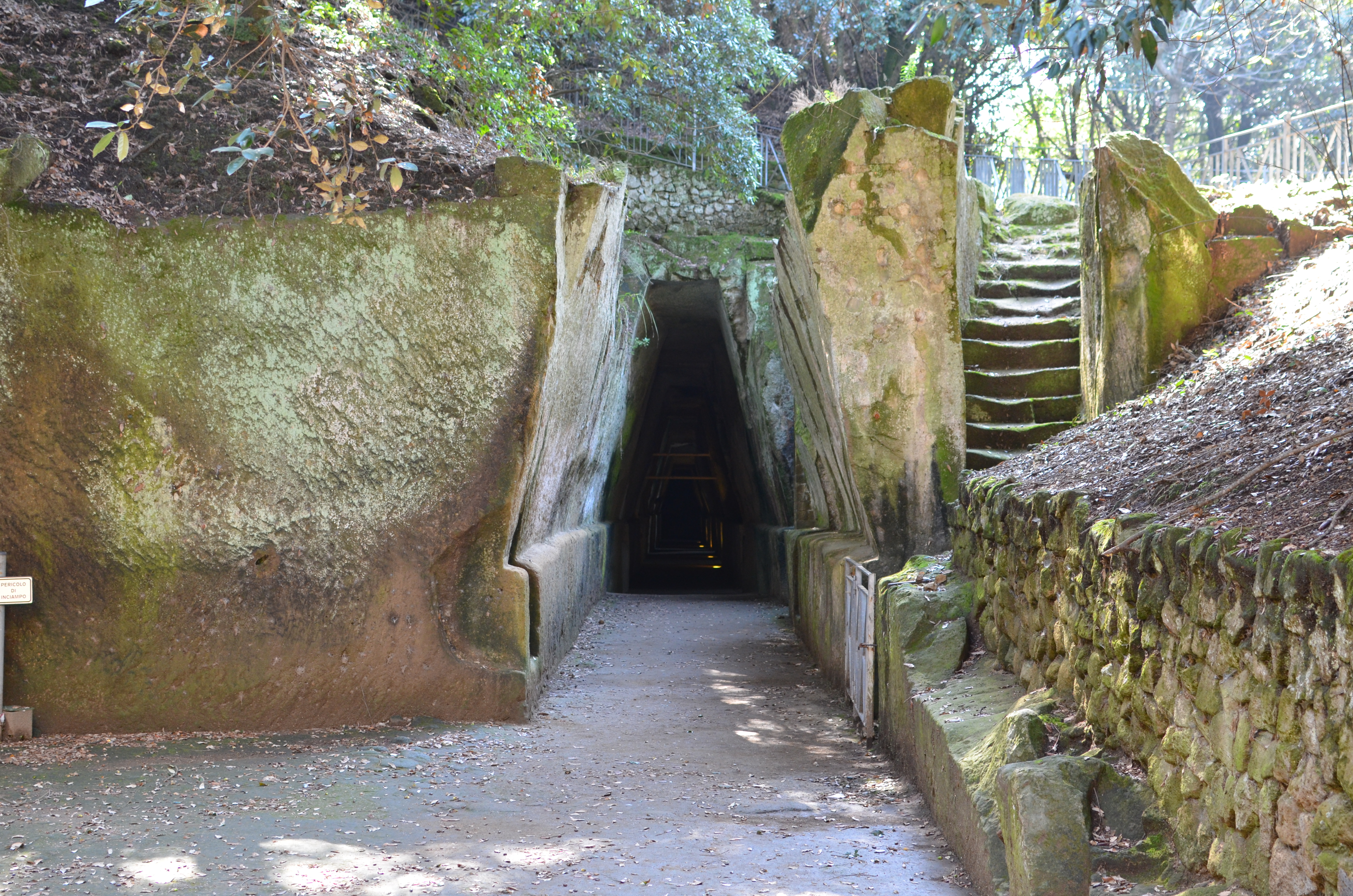
Entrance to the Cave of the Sibyl

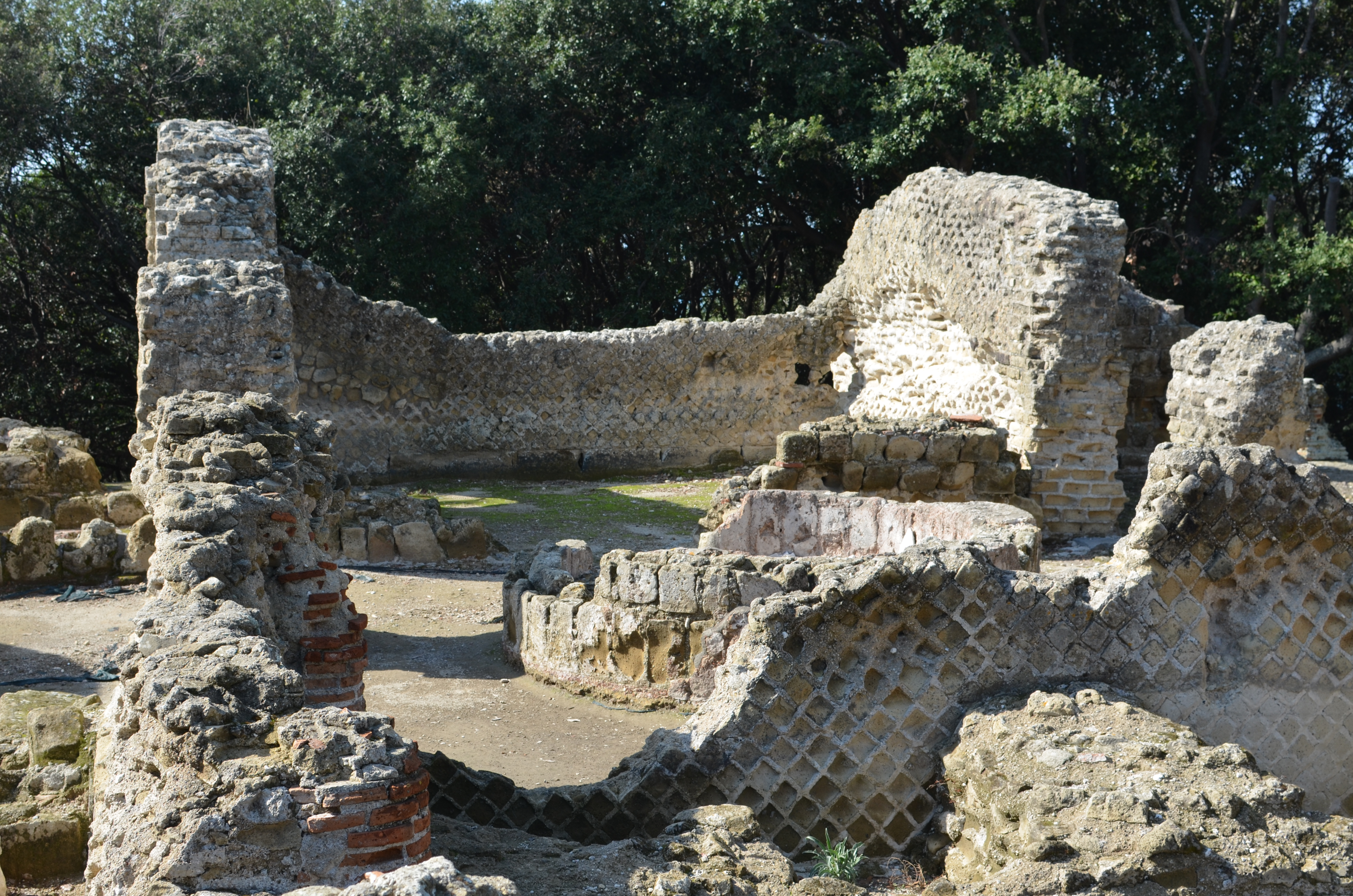
The Temple of Zeus at Cumae was converted into a paleochristian basilica. The baptismal font can still be seen in the back of the building.

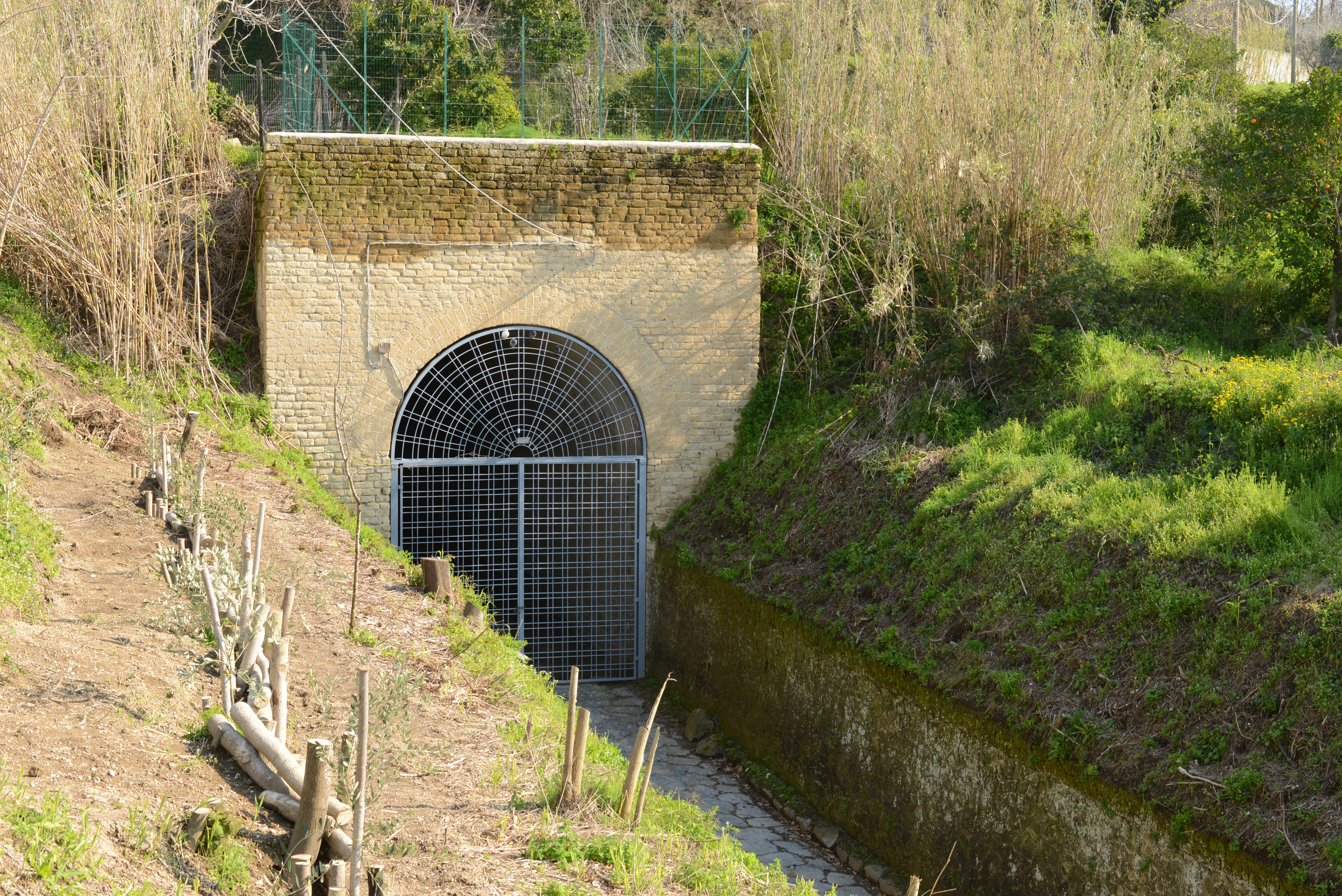
Grotta di Cocceio

The Greek period at Cumae came to an end in 421 BC, when the Oscans allied to the Samnites broke down the walls and took the city, ravaging the countryside. Some survivors fled to Neapolis.

The walls on the acropolis were rebuilt from 343 BCE. Cumae came under Roman rule with Capua and in 338 BCE was granted partial citizenship, a civitas sine suffragio. In the Second Punic War, in spite of temptations to revolt from Roman authority, Cumae withstood Hannibal's siege, under the leadership of Tib. Sempronius Gracchus.

The city prospered in the Roman period from the 1st c. BCE along with all the cities of Campania and especially the bay of Naples as it became a desirable area for wealthy Romans who built large villas along the coast. The "central baths" and the amphitheatre are built.

During the civil wars Cumae was one of the strongholds that Octavian used to defend against Sextus Pompey. Under Augustus extensive public building works and roads were begun and in or near Cumae several road tunnels were dug: one through the Monte di Cumae linking the forum with the port, the Grotta di Cocceio 1 km long to Lake Avernus and a third, the "Crypta Romana", 180m long between Lake Lucrino and Lake Averno. The temples of Apollo and Demeter were restored.

The proximity to Puteoli, the commercial port of Rome and to Misenum, the naval fleet base, also helped the region to prosper.

Another very important innovation was the construction of the great Serino aqueduct, the Aqua Augusta supplying many of the cities in the area from about 20 BC. Domitian's via Domitiana provided an important highway to the via Appia and thence to Rome from 95 AD.

The early presence of Christianity in Cumae is shown by the 2nd-century AD work The Shepherd of Hermas, in which the author tells of a vision of a woman, identified with the church, who entrusts him with a text to read to the presbyters of the community in Cuma. At the end of the 4th century, the temple of Zeus at Cumae was transformed into a Christian basilica.

The first historically documented bishop of Cumae was Adeodatus, a member of a synod convoked by Pope Hilarius in Rome in 465. Another was Misenus, who was one of the two legates that Pope Felix III sent to Constantinople and who were imprisoned and forced to receive Communion with Patriarch Acacius of Constantinople in a celebration of the Divine Liturgy in which Peter Mongus and other Miaphysites were named in the diptychs, an event that led to the Acacian Schism. Misenus was excommunicated on his return but was later rehabilitated and took part as bishop of Cumae in two synods of Pope Symmachus. Pope Gregory the Great entrusted the administration of the diocese of Cumae to the bishop of Misenum. Later, both Misenum and Cumae ceased to be residential sees and the territory of Cumae became part of the diocese of Aversa after the destruction of Cumae in 1207. Accordingly, Cumae is today listed by the Catholic Church as a titular see.

Under Roman rule, so-called "quiet Cumae" was peaceful until the disasters of the Gothic Wars (535–554), when it was repeatedly attacked, as the only fortified city in Campania aside from Neapolis: Belisarius took it in 536, Totila held it, and when Narses gained possession of Cumae, he found he had won the whole treasury of the Goths.

=== Diocese of Cuma(e) ===
A bishopric was established around 450 AD. In 700 it gained territory from the suppressed Diocese of Miseno.

In 1207 it was suppressed when forces from Naples, acting for the boy-King of Sicily, destroyed the city and its walls, as the stronghold of a nest of bandits. Its territory was divided and merged into the Roman Catholic Diocese of Aversa and Roman Catholic Diocese of Pozzuoli. Some of the citizens from Cumae, including the clergy and the cathedral capitular, took shelter in Giugliano.

==== Resident bishops ====
- Saint Massenzio (300? – ?)
- Rainaldo (1073? – 1078?)
- Giovanni (1134? – 1141?)
- Gregorio (1187? – ?)
- Leone (1207? – ?)

==== Titular see ====
In 1970, the diocese was nominally restored as a Latin titular see. The title has been held by:

- Bishop Louis-Marie-Joseph de Courrèges d'Ustou (1970.09.02 – 1970.12.10)
- Archbishop Edoardo Pecoraio (1971.12.28 – 1986.08.09)
- Bishop Julio María Elías Montoya, O.F.M.

== Archaeology ==
Despite the abandonment of the area of Cumae due to the formation of marshes, the memory of the ancient city remained alive. The ruins, although in a state of neglect, were later visited by many artists and with the repopulation of the area due to land reclamation, short excavation campaigns were made. The first excavations date to 1606 when thirteen statues and two marble bas-reliefs were found; later finds included the large statue of Jupiter from the Masseria del Gigante exhibited at the National Archaeological Museum of Naples. However, after the discovery of the Vesuvian sites the attention of the Bourbon explorers was diverted there and the Cumae area was abandoned and plundered of numerous finds which were then sold to private individuals. A first campaign of systematic excavations took place between 1852 and 1857 under Prince Leopoldo, brother of Ferdinando II of the Two Sicilies when the area of the Masseria del Gigante and some necropoles were explored. Later Emilio Stevens was given the concession and worked at Cumae between 1878 and 1893, completing the excavation of the necropolis, even though news of the various finds led to a continuous looting of the area.

A disaster occurred between 1910 and 1922 when draining of Lake Licola caused part of the necropolis to be destroyed.

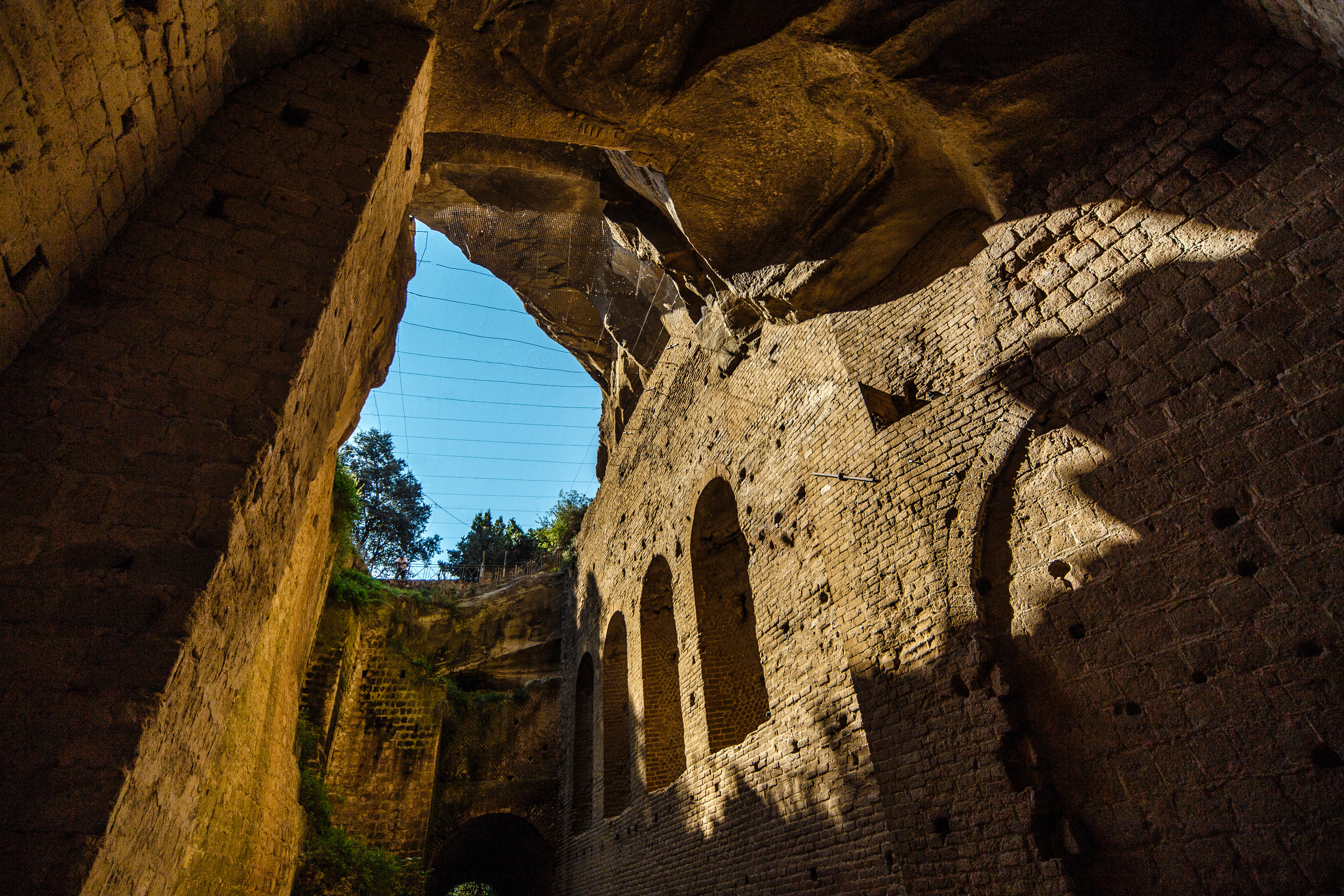
Crypta Romana

The explorations of the acropolis started in 1911, bringing to light the Temple of Apollo. Between 1924 and 1934 Amedeo Maiuri and Vittorio Spinazzola investigated the Temple of Jupiter, the Cave of the Sibyl and the Crypta Romana, while between 1938 and 1953 the lower city was explored. A chance discovery occurred in 1992 when during the construction of a gas pipeline near the beach a temple of Isis was discovered. In 1994 the "Kyme" project was activated for the restoration of the site. Excavation of the tholos tomb was completed, first partly explored in 1902. In the area of the forum a basilica-shaped building, the Aula Sillana, was discovered, while along the coastline three maritime villas were found.

Since 2001 the CNRS has been excavating a necropolis dating from 6th to 1st c. BCE outside the Porta mediana.

In June 2018 a painted tomb dating to the 2nd century BCE and depicting a banquet scene was discovered.

== Development of the ancient city ==
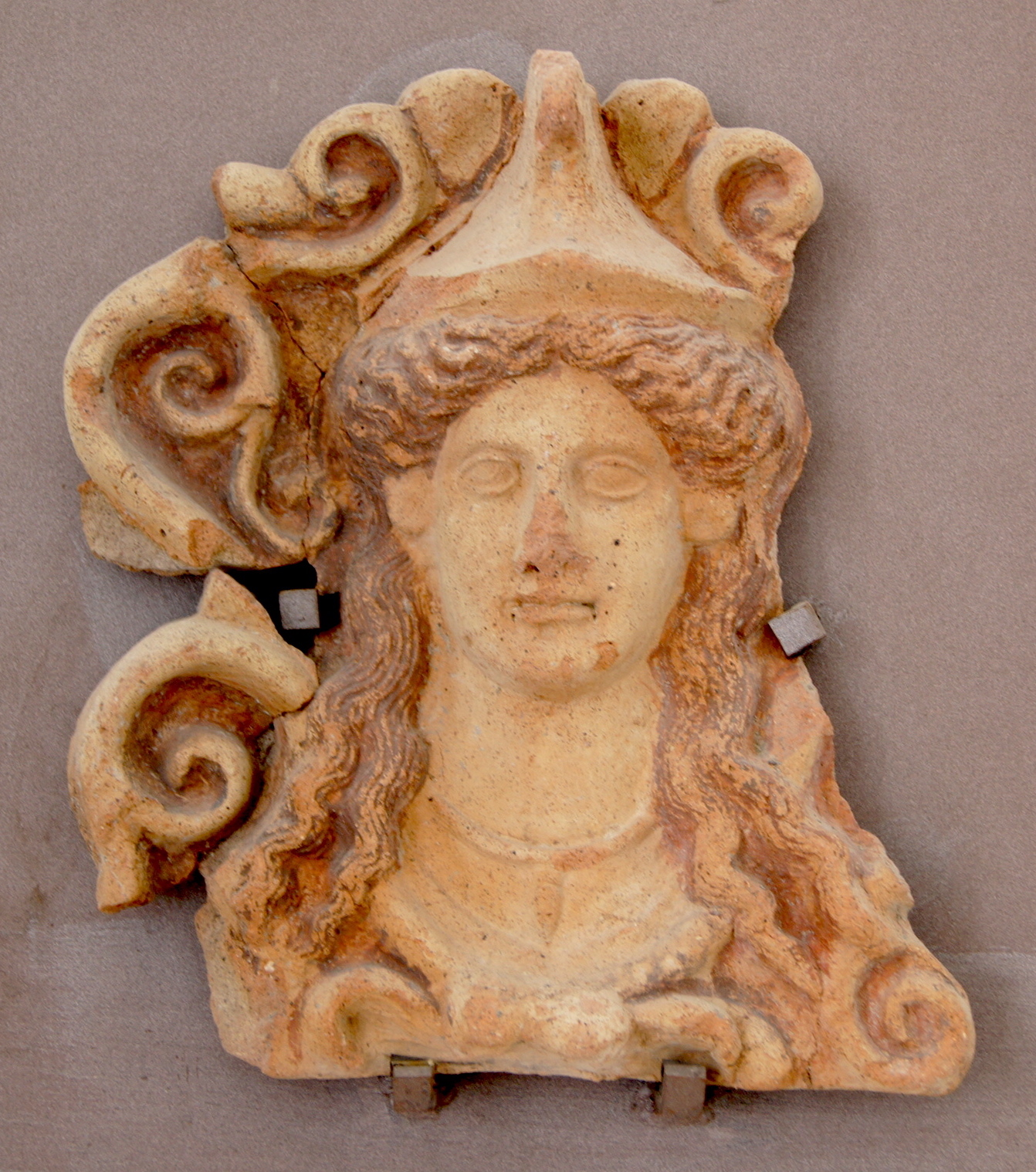
Athena terracotta antefix 6th c. BC

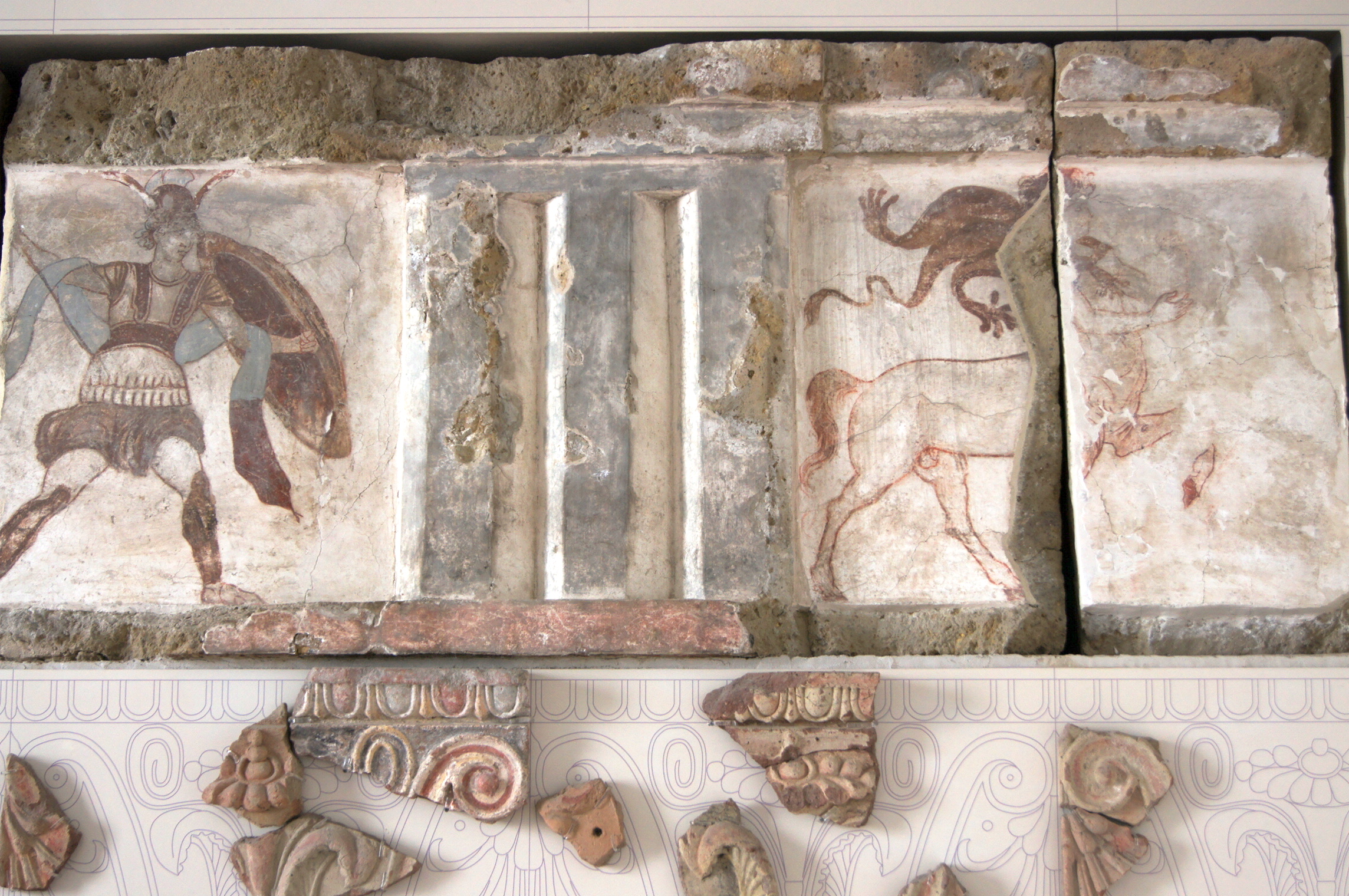
Doric frieze from temple ~340 BC

The ancient city was divided into two zones, namely the acropolis and the lower part on the plains and the coast. The acropolis was accessible only from the south side and it was on this area that the first nucleus of the city developed crossed by a road called Via Sacra leading to the main temples. The road began with two towers, one of which collapsed with part of the hill and the other was restored in the Byzantine era and is still visible. The lower city developed from the Samnite period and to a greater extent during the Roman age.

The lower city was defended by walls and during the Greek age the acropolis had probably the same type of defences, even if the remains today dating back to the 6th century BCE are only on the southeastern part of the hill perhaps also used as retaining walls of the ridge.

In the 6th c. BCE temples were built in tufa, wood and terracotta. Columns, cornices and capitals were made of yellow tufa, roofs and architraves of wood and to protect the overhang, terracotta tiles and elaborate antefix decorations. The city and acropolis walls were built from 505 BC, as well as the Sibyl's cave.

When the city was allied with the Romans in 338 BCE a new temple was built with exceptional painted friezes and ornamentation which have been discovered though the temple was destroyed after a few decades by fire.

Between the Punic Wars and the adoption of Latin as the official trading language (180 BC) the city walls were restored and a large stadium built west of the Porta mediana. The central baths were built and major work was done on the acropolis temples. From the end of the 2nd c. BCE Cumae's architecture became increasingly romanised.

The Augustan age saw many fine new buildings in the city such as the basilica or "Sullan Aula" south of the forum, decorated with polychrome marble. Water supply to the town was increased by an extension to the town of the great Serino aqueduct, the Aqua Augusta, after 20 BCE and paid for by local benefactors, the Lucceii family, praetors of the city, who also built an elaborate nymphaeum in the forum as well as several other monuments and buildings.

In the 1st c. AD the "Temple of the Giant" was built, so-called because the famous giant bust of Jupiter (now in Naples Archaeological Museum) was discovered in its ruins; the walls of the temple are incorporated into a later farmhouse.

After Mount Vesuvius erupted in 79 AD, survivors from Herculaneum came to Cumae and it became a well prosperous town.

=== Surviving ancient monuments ===
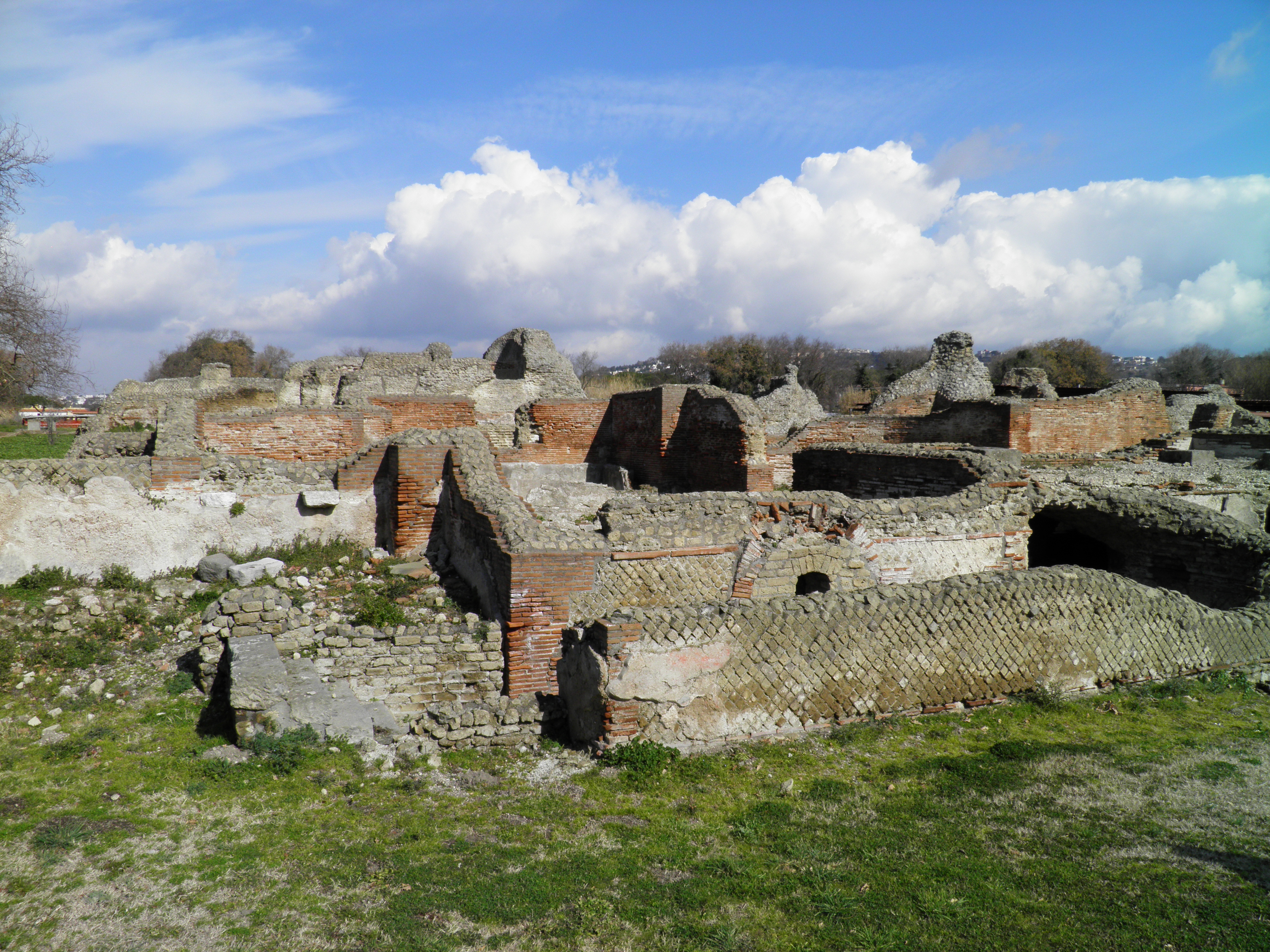
The Thermae of the Forum

The visible monuments include:

- Temple of Diana
- Capitoline temple of Jupiter, Juno and Minerva
- Temple of Isis
- Temple of Demeter
- Temple of Apollo, built in the 6th or 5th century BC, renewed in the late 4th century BC and again under Augustus, transformed into a church around 500 AD.
- The Acropolis
- Arco Felice
- The Forum
- Grotta di Cocceio
- Crypta Romana
- Masseria del Gigante

==== Arco Felice ====
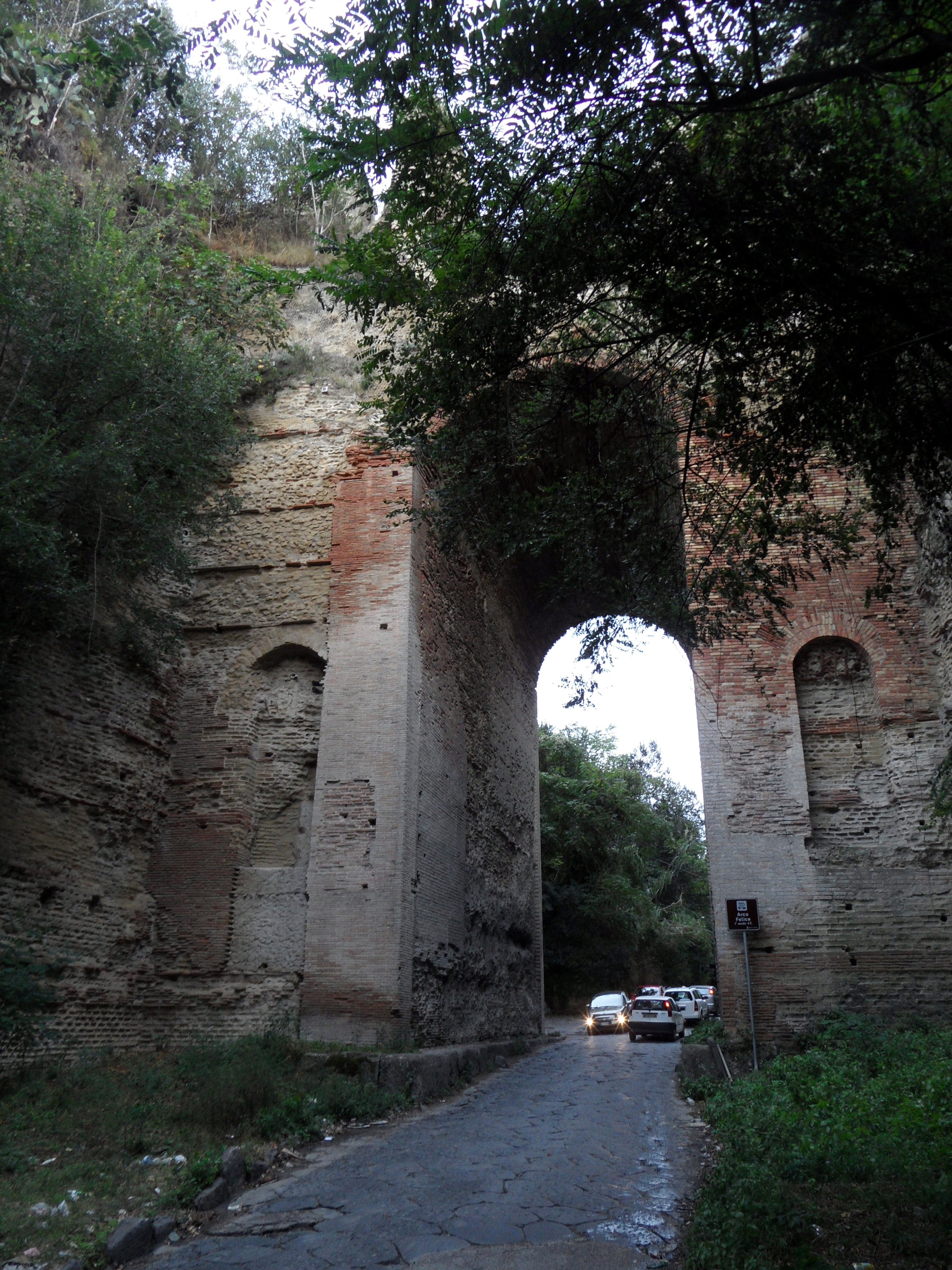
Arco Felice and via Domitiana in use today

The Arco Felice was a 20 m high monumental entrance to the city built in a cut through Monte Grillo which Domitian made in 95 AD to avoid the long detour imposed by the via Appia, and allow easier access to Cumae along what was later called the via Domitiana while the bridge also carried a road along the ridge of the hill. It was built of brick and tiled in marble, and surmounted by two rows of arches of lighter concrete covered with brick. The piers had three niches on both sides where statues were placed.

The via Domitiana, whose paving is still perfectly preserved and is in continuous use today, connected to the via Appia, the artery of communication with Rome, as well as with Pozzuoli and Naples.

The arch probably replaced a smaller gate from Greek times and in a higher position.

==== Crypta Romana ====
The Crypta Romana is a tunnel dug into the tufa under the Cuma hill, crossing the acropolis in an east-west direction, giving an easier route from the city to the sea. Its construction is part of the set of military enhancement works built by Agrippa for Augustus and designed by Lucius Cocceius Auctus in 37 BC, including the construction of the new Portus Iulius and its connection with the port of Cumae through the so-called Grotta di Cocceio and the Crypta Romana itself.

With the displacement of the fleet from Portus Iulius to the port of Miseno in 12 BCE and the end of the Civil War between Octavian and Mark Antony in 31 BCE the tunnel lost its strategic value. The forum entrance was made monumental with 4 statue niches in 95 AD at the same time as the Arco Felice was built. An avalanche closed the sea entrance in the 3rd c. After 397 it was reopened. In the Christian age it was used as a cemetery area; in the 6th c. the Byzantine general Narsete tried to use it to reach the city during the siege of Cumae, but weakened the structure and a large section of the vault collapsed.

It was brought to light between 1925 and 1931 by the archaeologist Amedeus Maiuri.

=== Sculpture ===
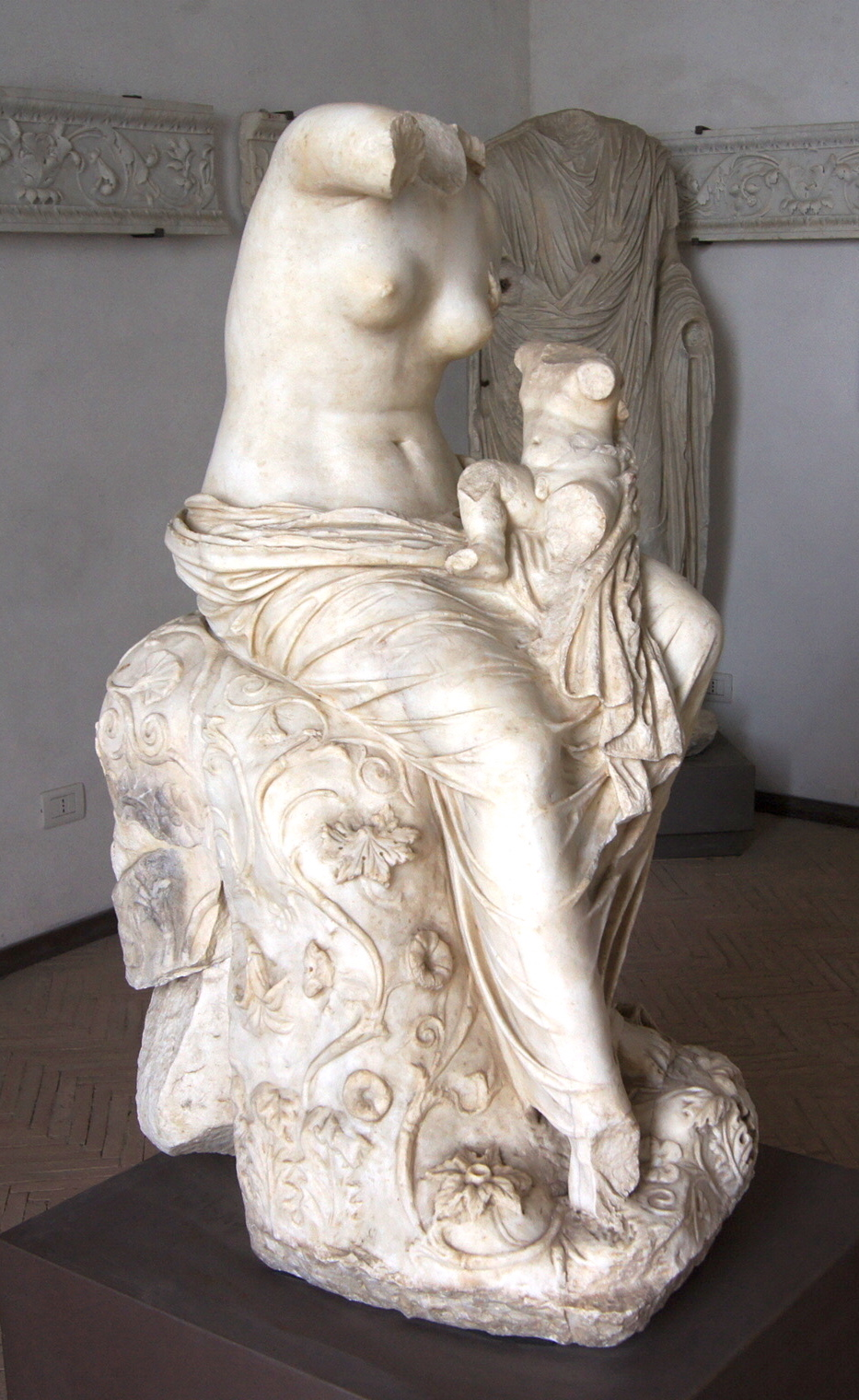
Psyche and Eros, forum 1-2c AD

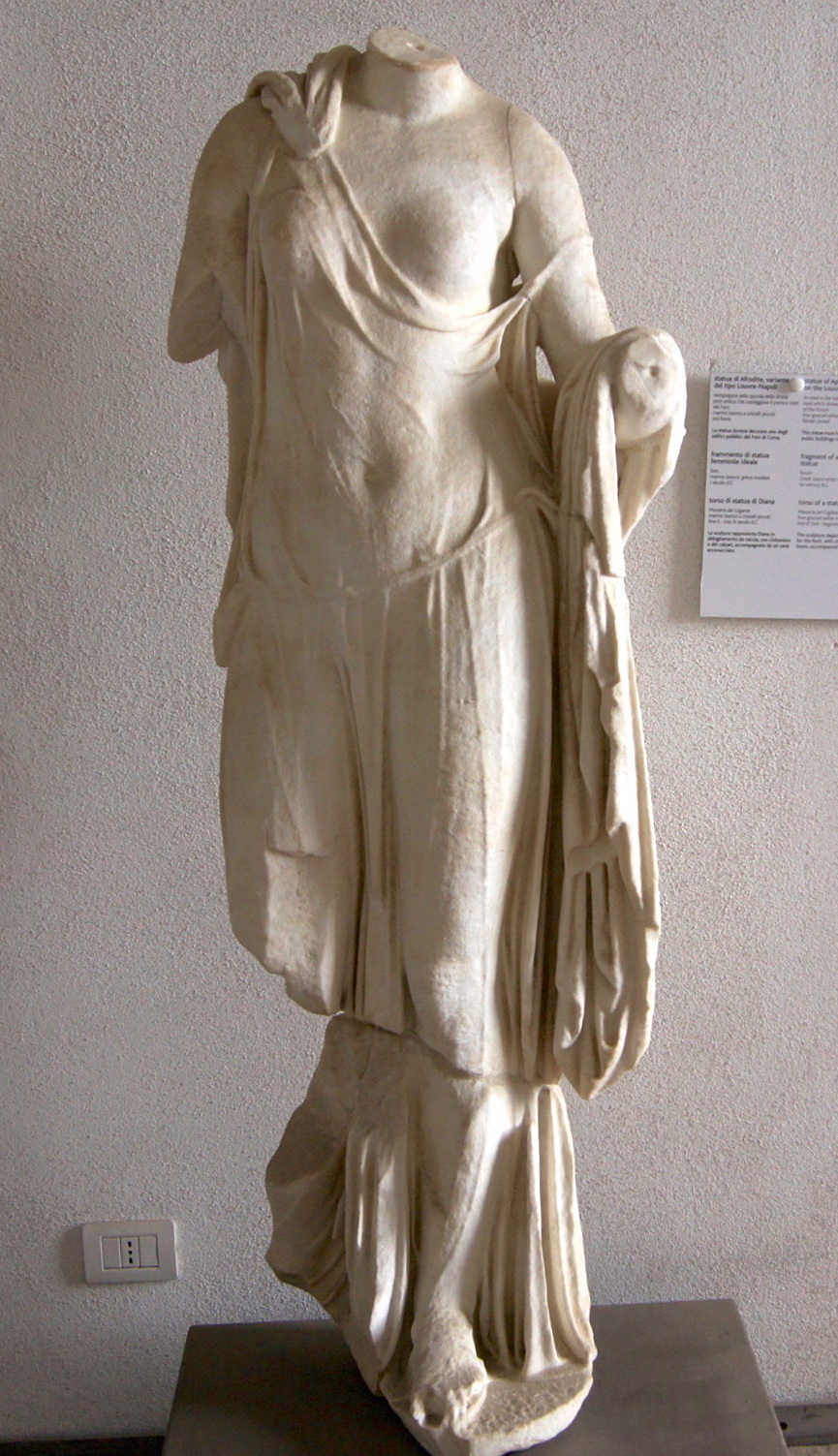
Diana

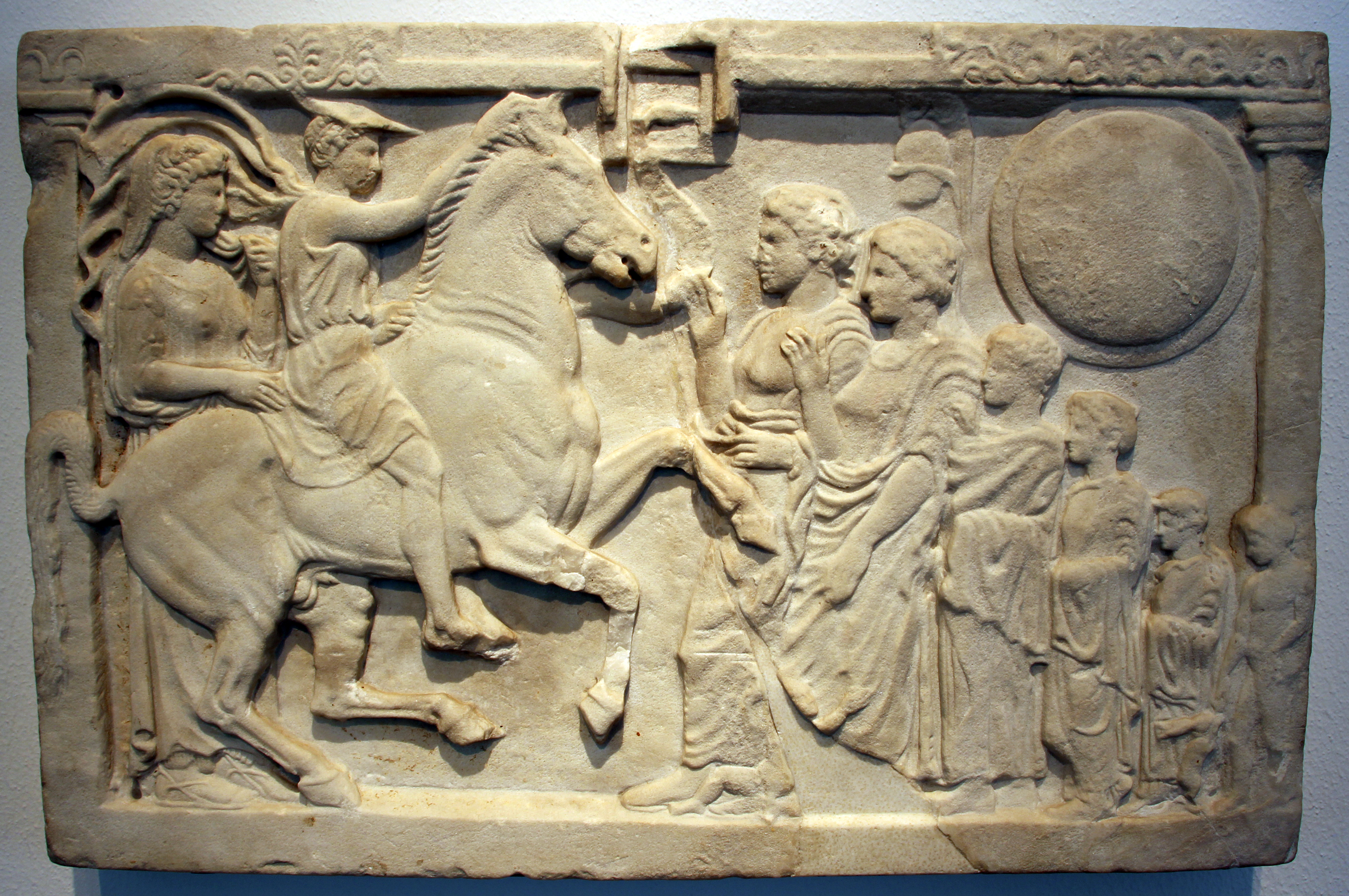
Votive relief 400 BCE (Antikensammlung Berlin)

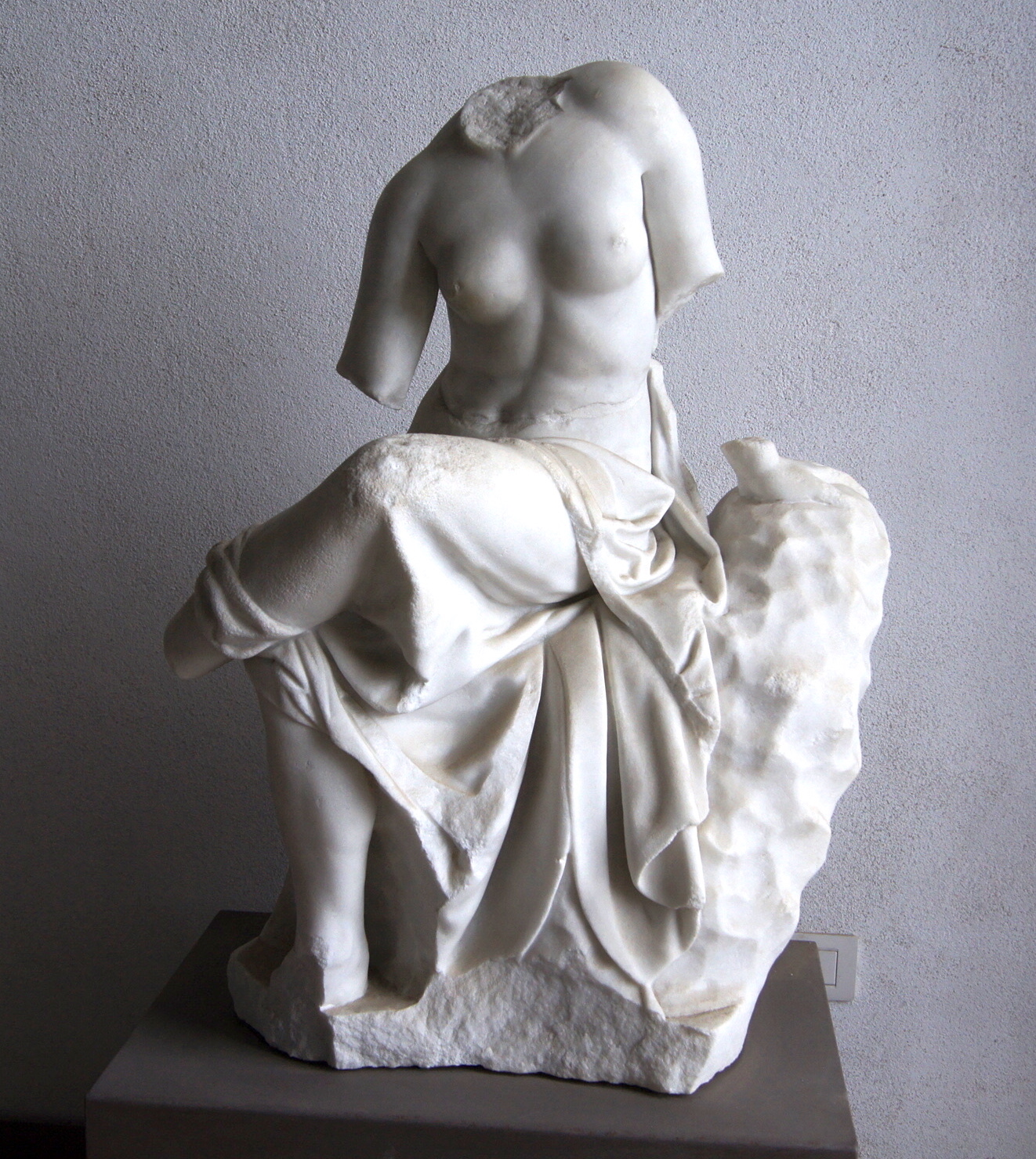
Nymph

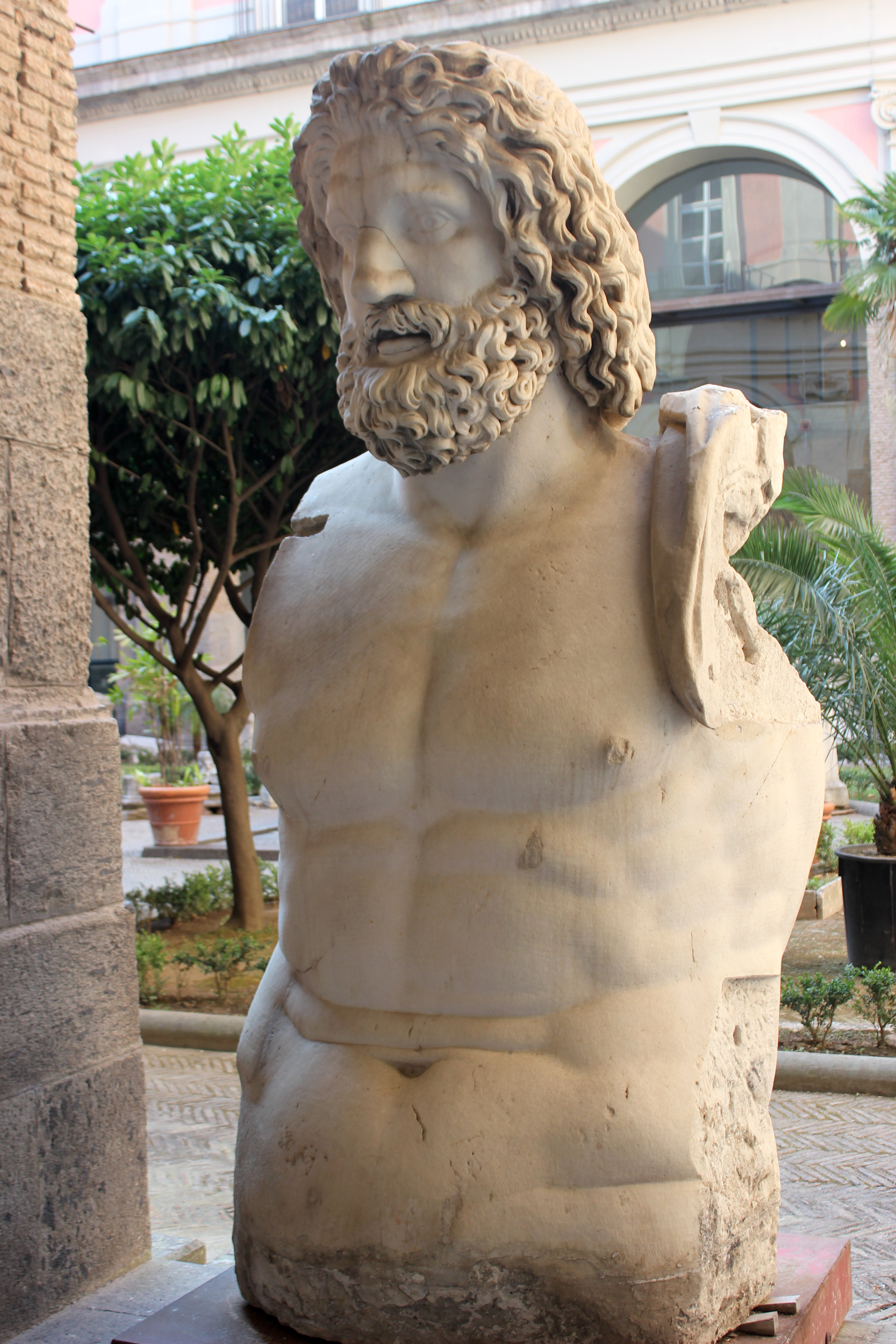
Colossal Jupiter statue (Naples museum)

== Mythology ==
Cumae is perhaps most famous as the seat of the Cumaean Sibyl. Her sanctuary is now open to the public.

In Roman mythology, there is an entrance to the underworld located at Avernus, a crater lake near Cumae, and was the route Aeneas used to descend to the Underworld.

== Gallery ==
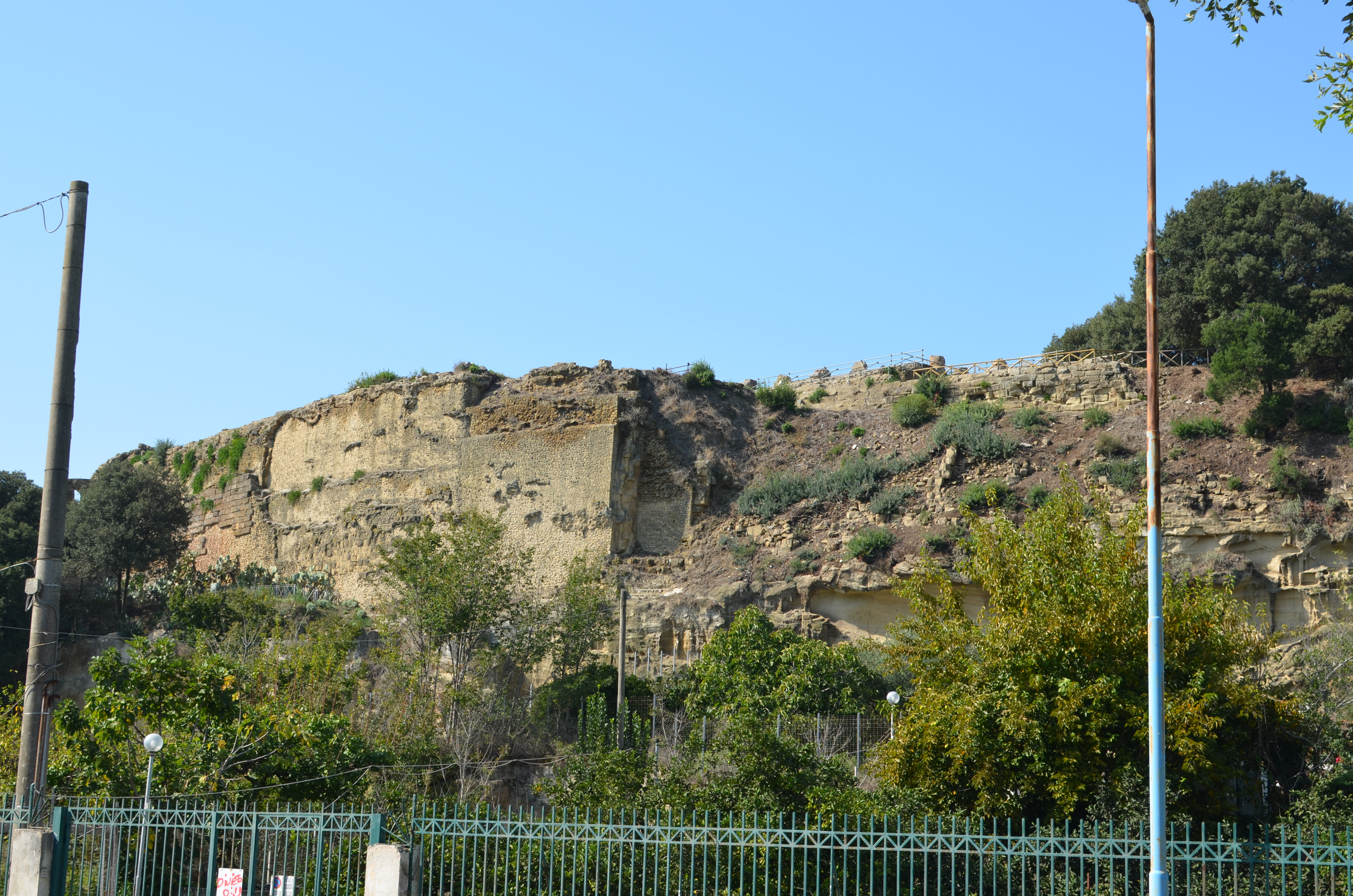
The walls of the acropolis

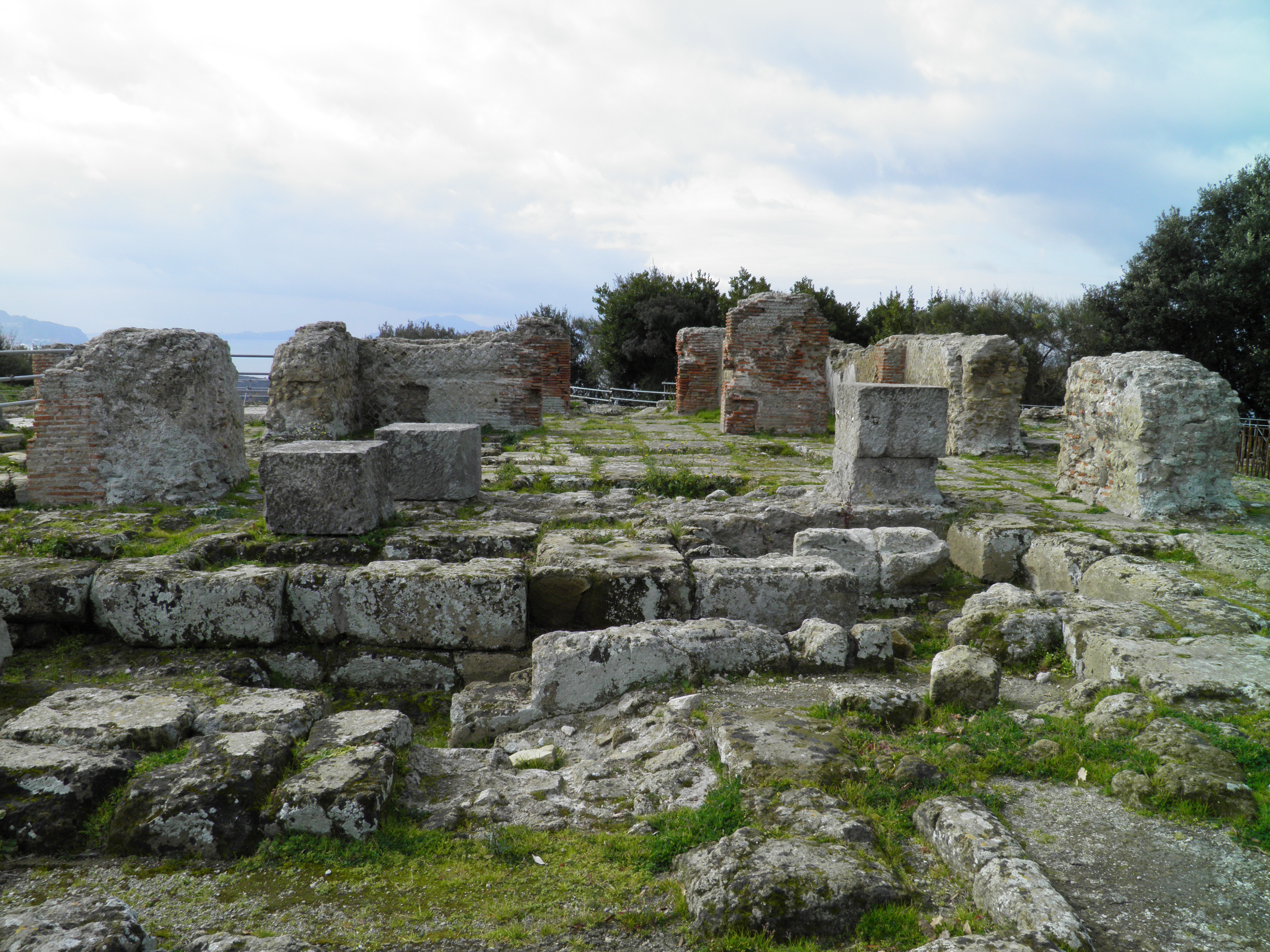
The Temple of Apollo

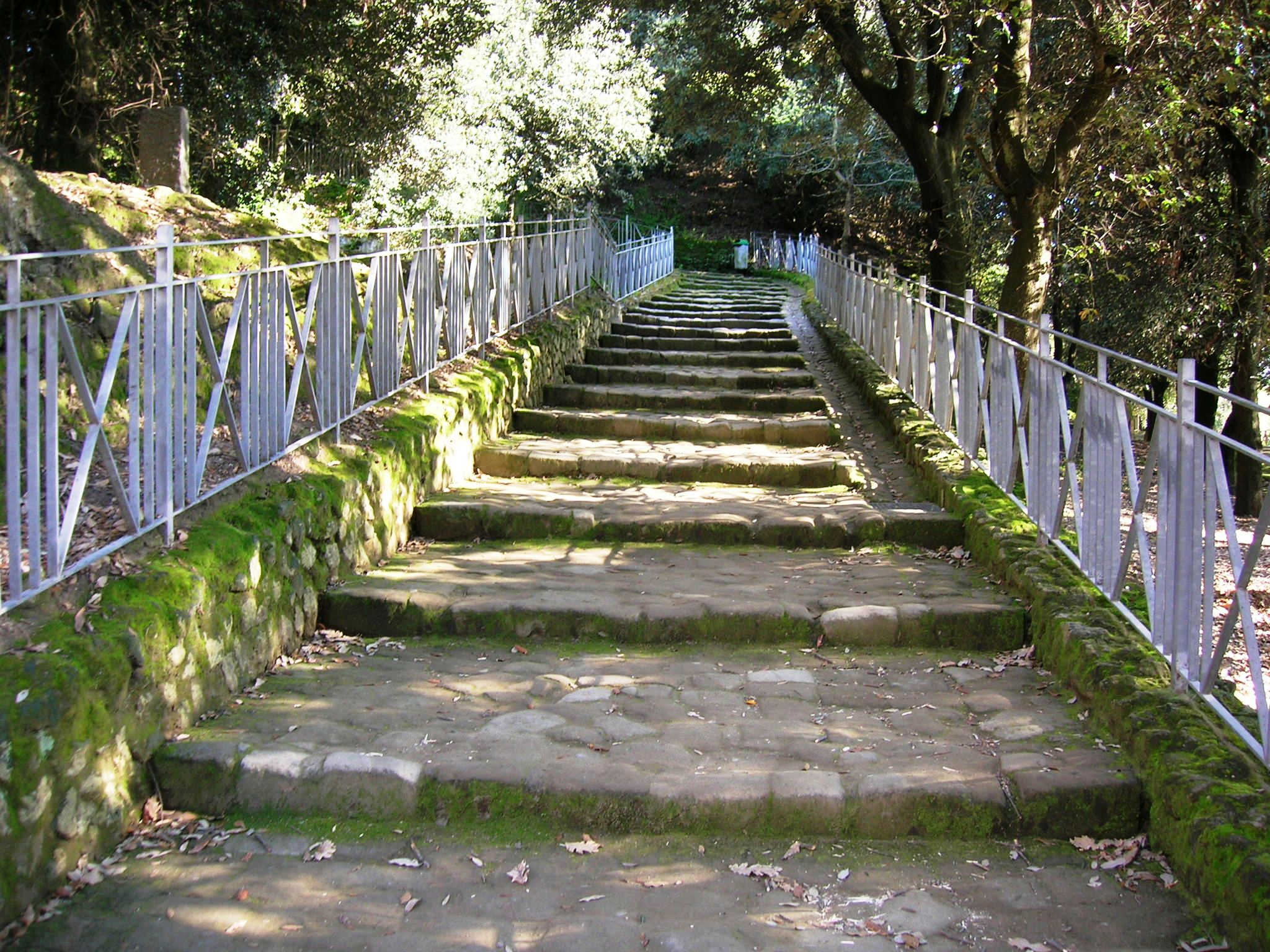
Street in Cumae

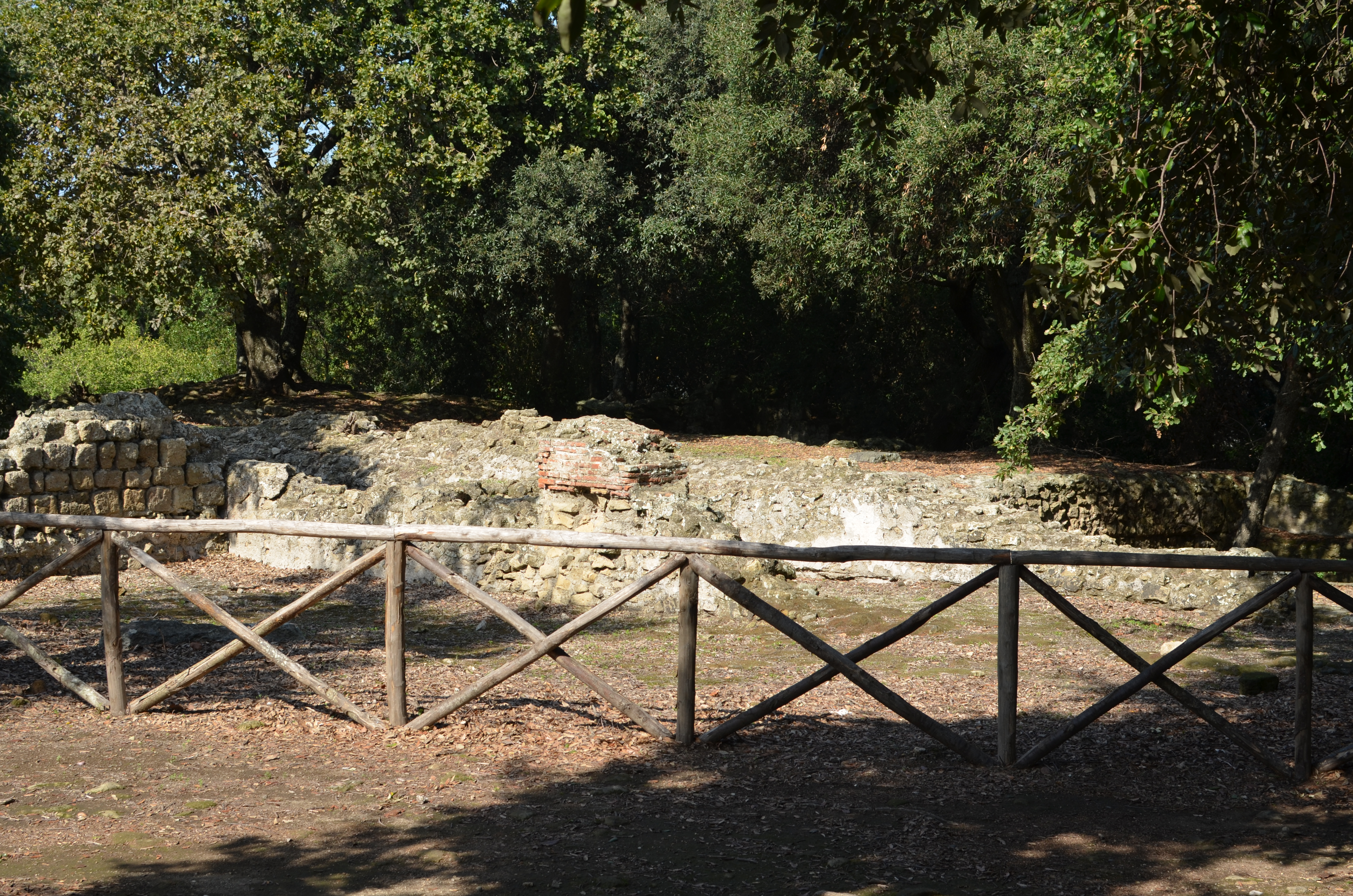
The Temple of Diana

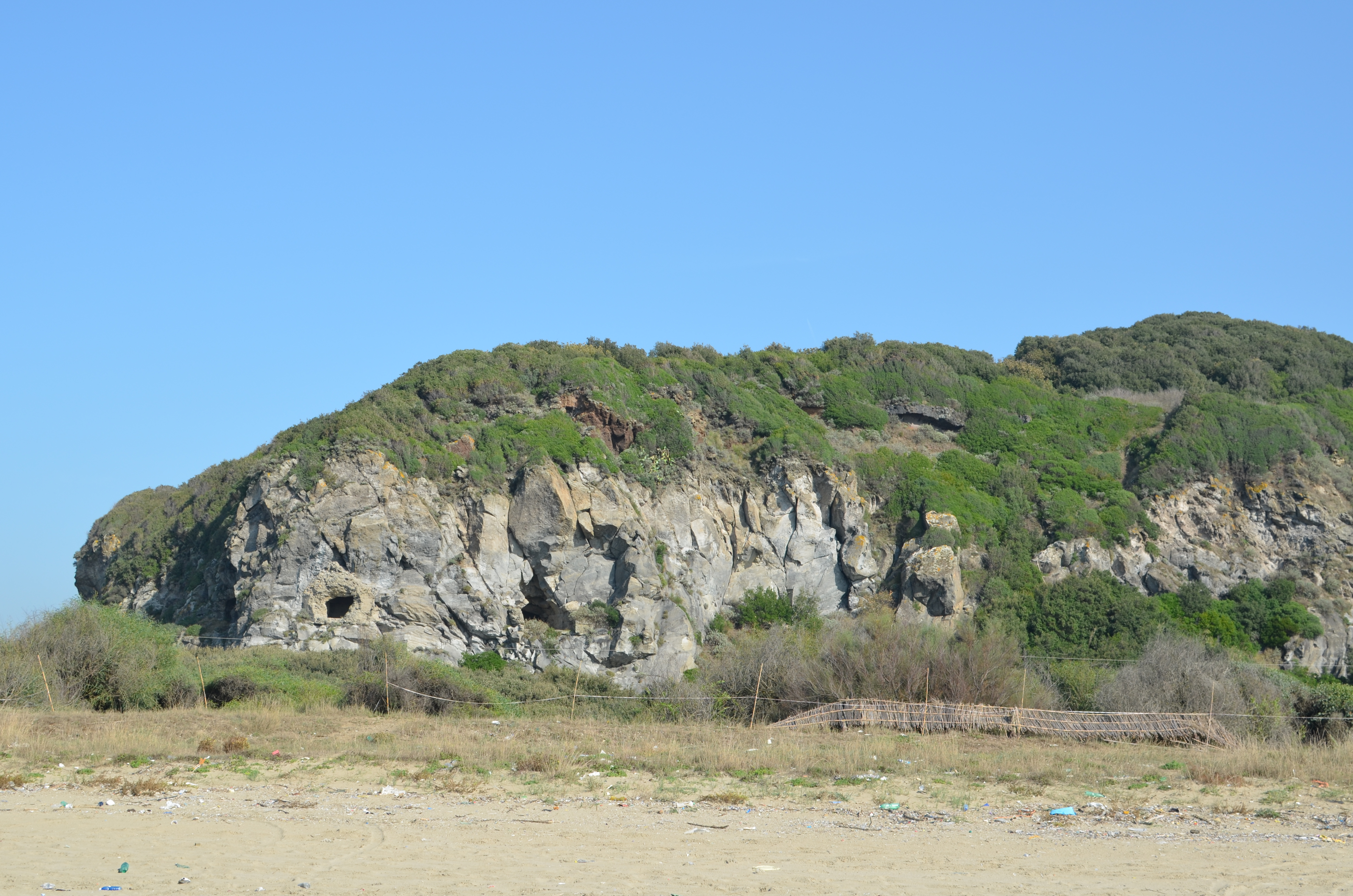
Acropolis seen from west

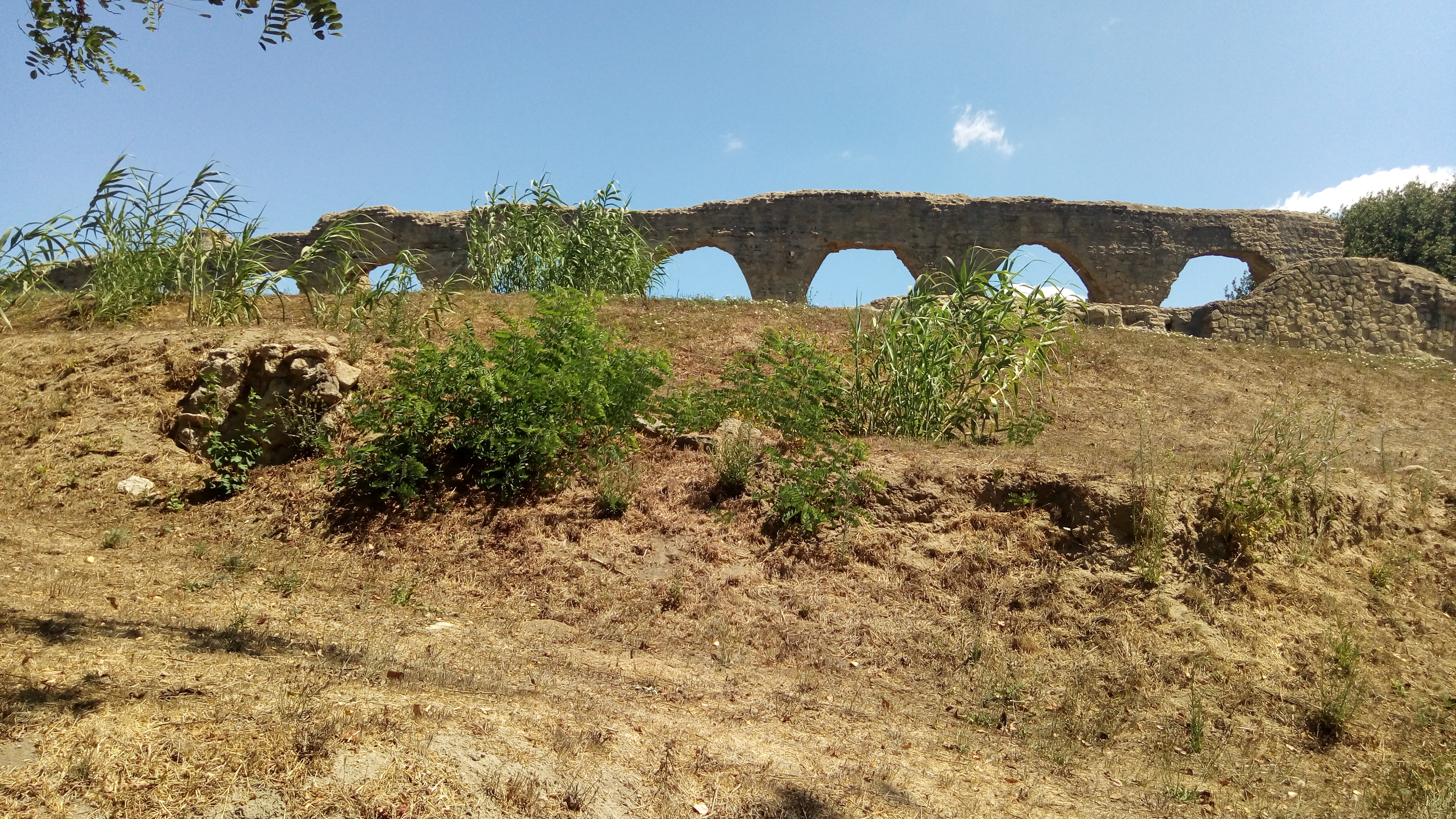
Amphitheater

== See also ==
- List of ancient Greek cities
- Graecians
- Fusaro Lake
