= Piscina Mirabilis =

Ancient Roman cistern in Campania, Italy

Coordinates: 40°47′43″N 14°4′48″E

Map of Miseno peninsula in Bay of Naples

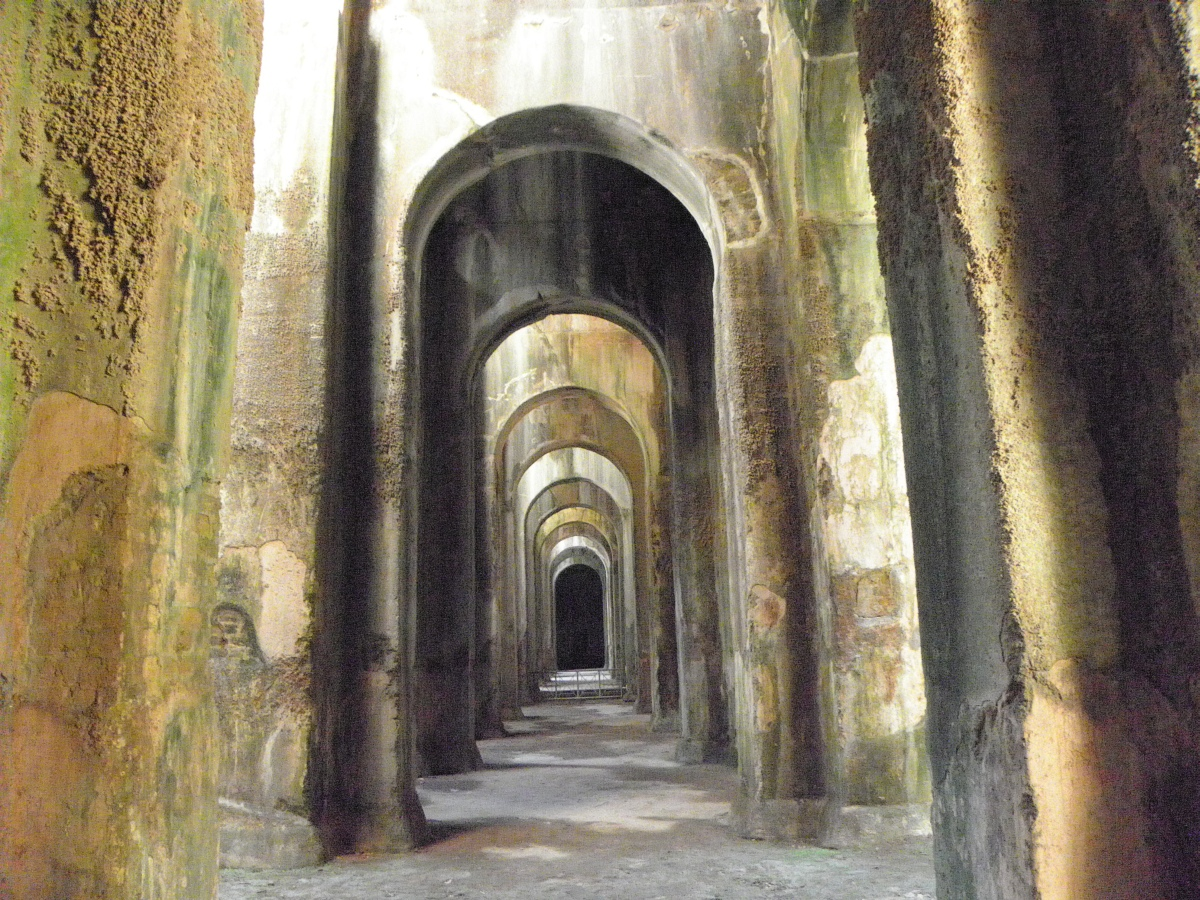
The Piscina Mirabilis

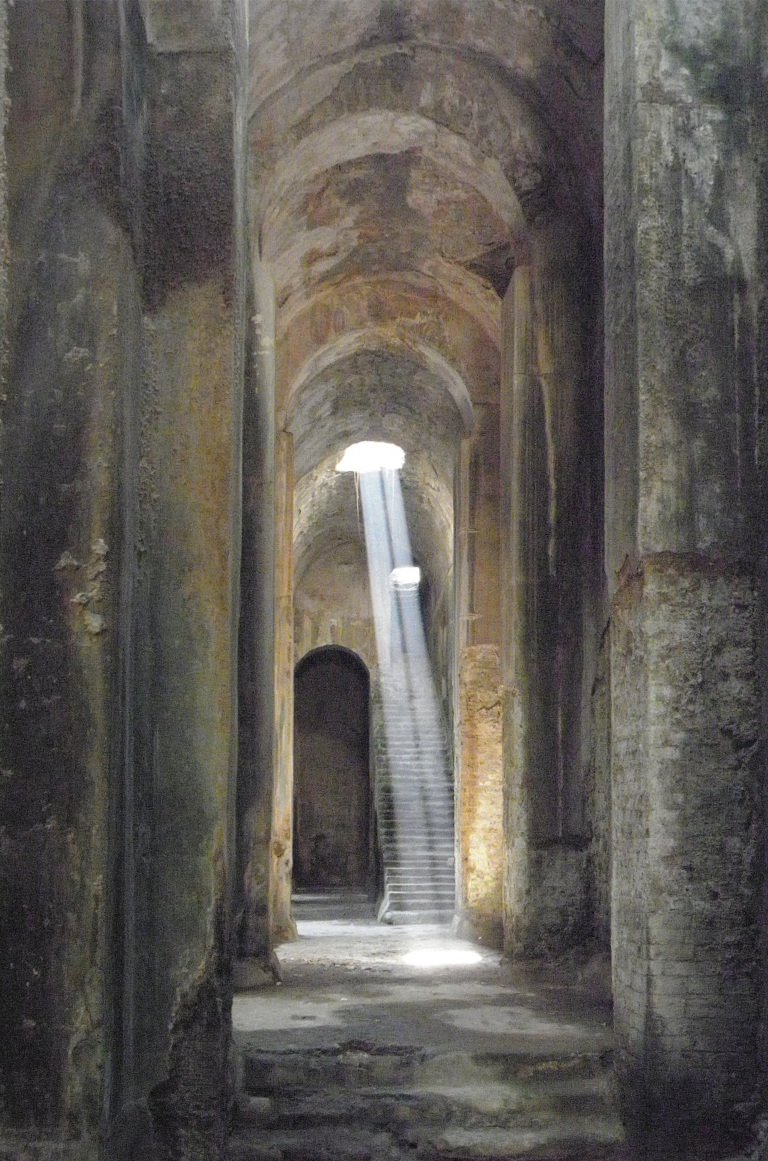
Piscina Mirabilis with Tyndall effect

The Piscina Mirabilis (Latin for "wondrous pool") is an Ancient Roman cistern on the Bacoli hill at the western end of the Gulf of Naples, southern Italy. It ranks as one of the largest ancient cisterns built by the ancient Romans, compared to the largest Roman reservoir, the Yerebatan Sarayi (aka Basilica Cistern) in Istanbul.

The adjective Mirabilis was given by the 14th c. Tuscan poet Francesco Petrarca on one of his visits.

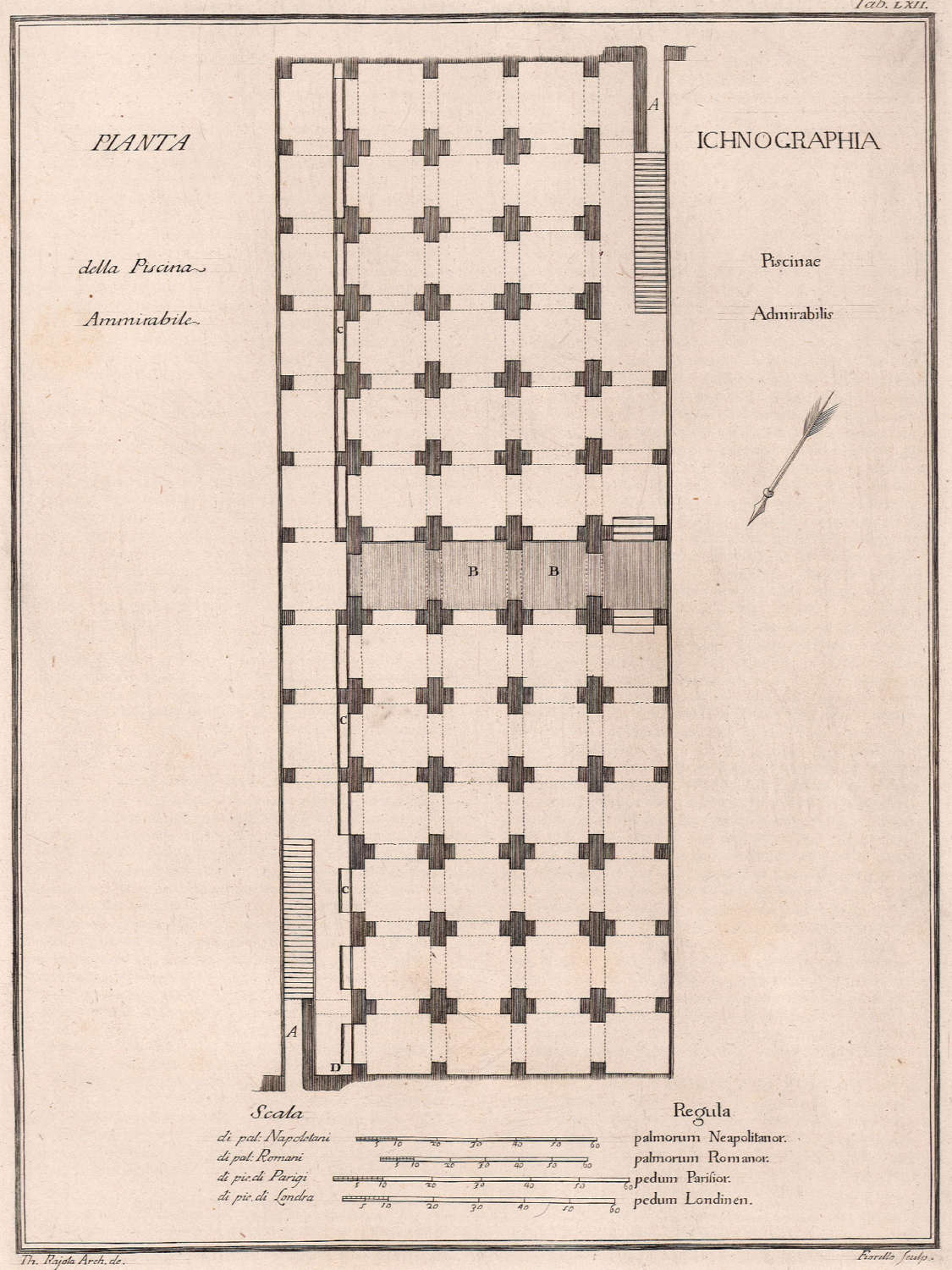
Floor plan (Th. Rajola Arch, de. & Fiorillo, Sculp. 1768)

== History ==
The Piscina Mirabilis was built under Augustus possibly to provide water to the Classis Misenensis in the nearby port of Misenum, which needed large quantities of fresh water for the base itself and for the ships. As it lies 1 km away from the residential and military quarters at Misenum which lay beside each other and which were fed directly by the Aqua Augusta, it is also possible that the cistern belonged instead to one of the many luxurious villas built in this area, like the smaller Grotta della Dragonara and Cento Camerelle cisterns nearby.

The Piscina Mirabilis was supplied with water from the Aqua Augusta, built after 33 BC, which brought water to most of the sites around Naples.

A row of twelve small chambers with barrel vaults were added on the north-eastern side in the late 1st to early 2nd century to increase the usable capacity and constructed in opus mixtum and opus vittatum. In one of them is an opus signinum floor with labyrinth-shaped mosaic tesserae and a central white inlaid panel with limestone polychrome tiles, which seems to date to a more ancient phase.

The cistern was definitively out of use when the Aqua Augusta was destroyed between the 4th and 5th century AD.

== Structure ==
Testament to its monumentality are the dimensions: 15 metres (49 ft) high, 72 metres (236 ft) long, and 25 metres (82 ft) wide. The capacity is 12,600 cubic metres (440,000 cu ft), amounting, in other words, to 12.6 million litres (3.33 million US gallons) of water, or roughly the size of 5 Olympic-size swimming pools.

It was built as a kind of hypostyle hall on a quadrangular plan to obtain four rows of twelve cruciform pillars per row which divide the interior space into five long naves and thirteen courtyards (just as if it were a cathedral, hence its local nicknames of "the Water Cathedral" or the "Cathedral of Bacoli"). The 48 columns support a barrel vaulted ceiling covered by a roof terrace made of opus caementicium and paved in waterproof opus signinum.

The piscina had two entrances (AA), a staircase supported by three arches in the north-west corner and one in the south-east, currently closed. The only one of the two staircases (CC) that still allows access to the main nave is the north-western staircase. Given the absence of holes visible from the outside, it is presumed that water was introduced through pipes coming from the North-West entrance (D). In the middle of the short central nave there is a 1.1 m deep basin (BB), hollowed out in the floor and provided with an outlet at one end, which served as a so-called piscina limaria (waste-bath, i.e. a settling and drainage basin) for the decantation, cleaning and periodic emptying of the cistern. Water was extracted from above through ancient hydraulic systems, exploiting the holes in the barrel vaults.

The walls and pillars of the pool are faced in opus reticulatum, with recourse to bricks for the walls and to tufelli for the pillars. A usual, the walls are waterproofed with opus insigninum (cocciopesto in Italian), smoothing the corners through kerbs placed at their bases.

Water was pumped out of the cistern using machines placed on the roof terrace of the cistern, which were extended in the 1st century AD by adding a series of 12 supporting barrel-vaulted rooms on the north-west side.

== Restoration ==
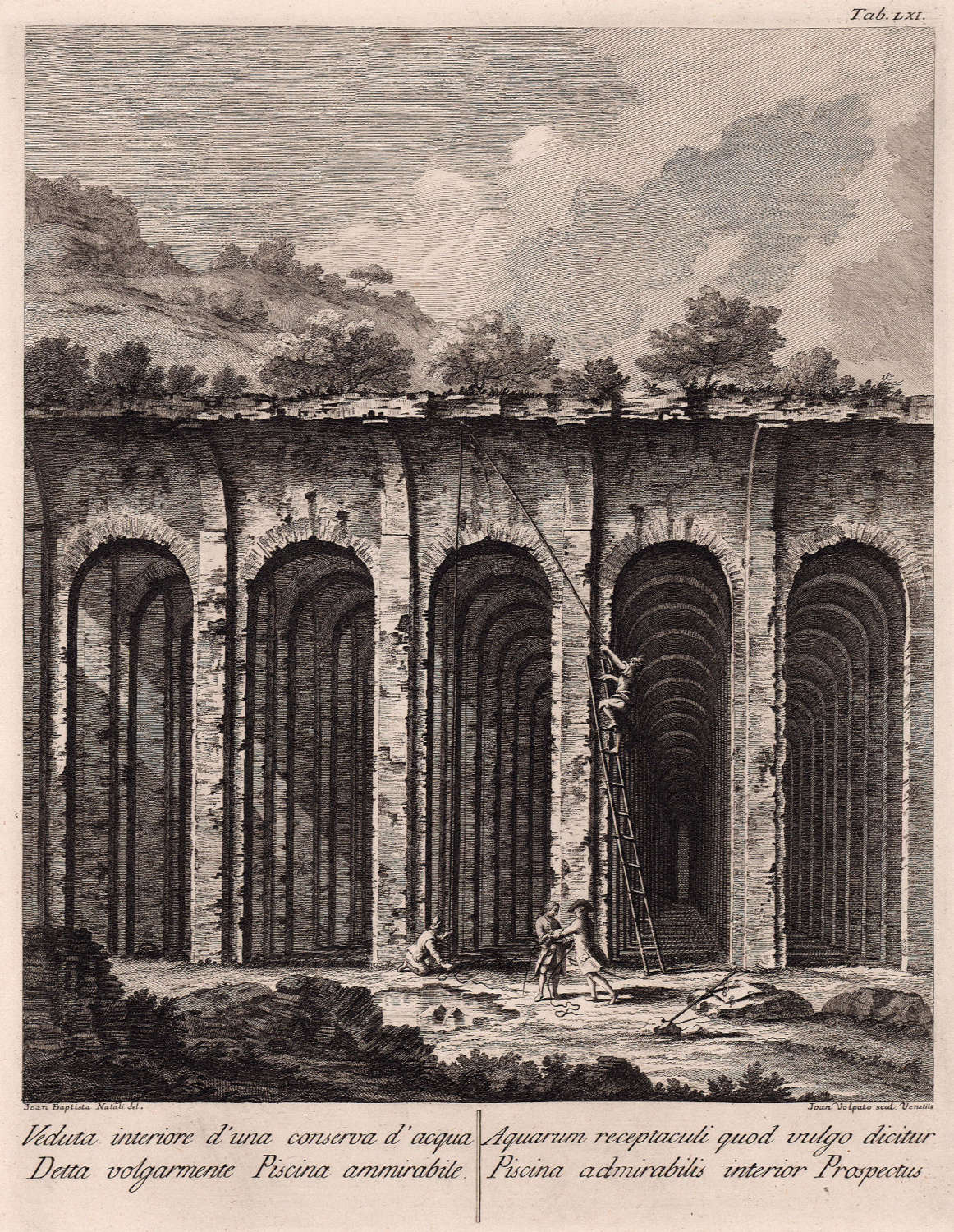
Engraving Joan. Baptista Natali del. & Joan. Volpato, scul. Venetiis (Tab. LXI)

The first work documented is the completion of the excavations between 1910 and 1926, followed by the consolidation of the damaged walls. In 1926 restoration of the second and third supporting arch was carried out and the surfaces of the pillars were restored with new opus reticulatum. In 1929 the access staircase was covered with a layer of cocciopesto. In 1936 the missing parts of the vaults were reconstructed and the extrados was repaired with concrete.

In 2007 the roof terrace was consolidated and waterproofed.

== Access ==
The ancient cistern is in private hands but is open to the public.

== See also ==
- List of Roman cisterns
- Basilica Cistern
- Cistern of Philoxenos
- Theodosius Cistern
