= Cerrato Cellars =

Underground archaeological monument in Bovino, Foggia, Italy

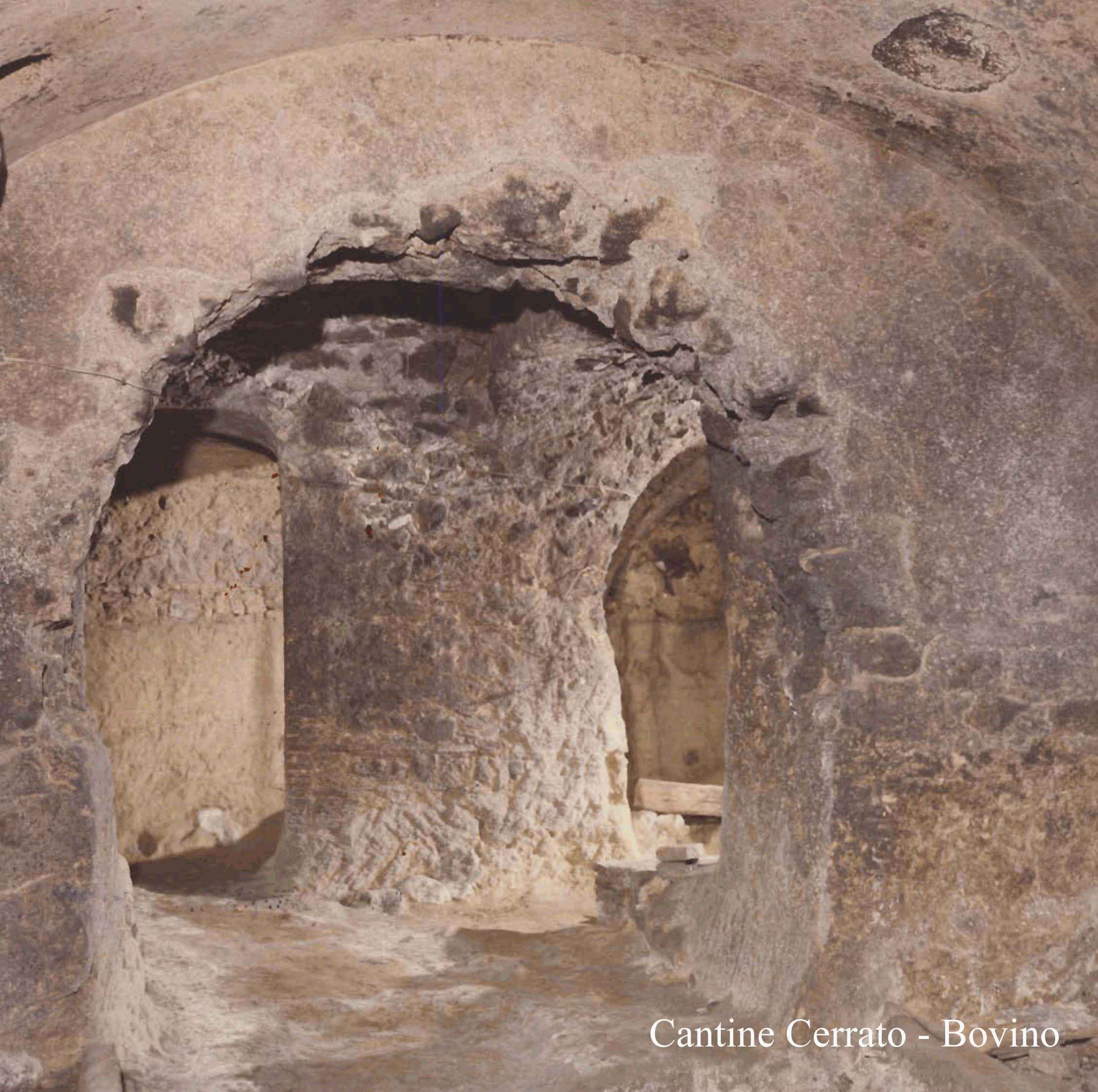
Cerrato Cellars – Detail of the rooms

The Cerrato Cellars, also locally known as Cantine Cerrato, are an underground archaeological monument of Bovino, in the province of Foggia in Apulia (Italy) and consist of two rooms belonging to a cistern of the Roman period. The cellars are located in the historic center of Bovino, under the urban block between the cathedral and tree nearby streets (via Roma, via Torino and via Alfieri), about three meters deep from the current street level. The remains are accessible from via Torino, but the underground areas extend for over 20 meters and continue underneath other buildings.

== Description ==
The ancient remains consist of two perpendicular rooms (A and B), partially cut into the rock and partly built with “laterzio” brick walls, belonging to the Roman period. The rooms are entirely covered in opus signinum and have barrel vaults. Underground ducts, connecting to wells and other tanks, flow into it. Room B is longitudinally separated into two other rooms by pillars with "laterizio" brick arches. These were probably cisterns, connected with the city's water supply, perhaps settling basins on arrival of the aqueduct. The two main rooms are connected with other ancient structures along the axis represented today by Guido Paglia square, Duomo square and Marino Boffa square (where the city forum was supposed to exist), all oriented according to the probable orthogonal arrangement of the urban area.

=== Room A ===
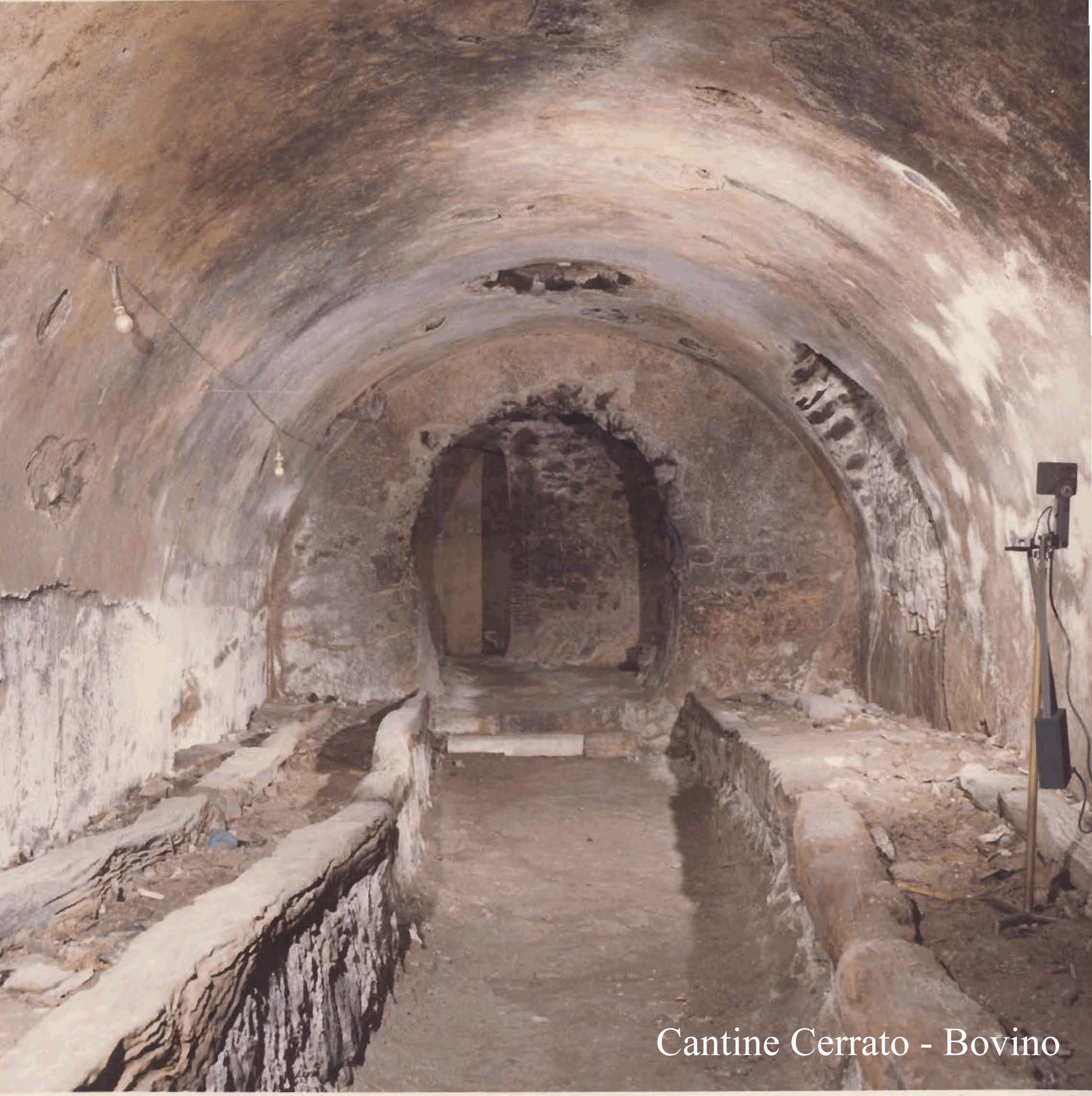
Cerrato Cellars – Room A

The room A, smaller (16.50 m x 4.40 m, with a height of at least 4 m), is oriented in a north-south direction and narrows in the southern part, where the wall is rounded. The walls of the north and west sides are "laterizio" brick: the north wall has a thickness of 70/90 cm and retains an opening of 2 m wide, probably from a late period, while the west wall, which divides it from the room B, it is about 1 m thick; the other two sides are dug in the local sandstone. The walls are waterproofed with a smoothed opus signinum coating.

The barrel vault, covered with pozzolanic plaster, has numerous vent pipes and two wells, one at the southern end, 90 cm in diameter, and the other towards the north, 1 m in diameter. Both wells are contemporaneous with the cistern, as shown by the covering of their opening. In the north-west corner there is also a terracotta pipe of 24 cm in diameter.

A conduit also appears towards the south end of the eastern wall, which seems to date back. In this conduit three branches converge, all cut into the rock:

- the first, 53 cm wide and about 150 cm high, almost parallel to the west wall, flows into room B;
- the second, 45 cm wide, extends straight to the west at a level of about 60 cm and underneath other tunnels;
- the third, 45 cm wide and about 155 cm high, reaches after a distance of about 4 meters an ancient well of 150 cm of diameter, completely plastered.

=== Room B ===
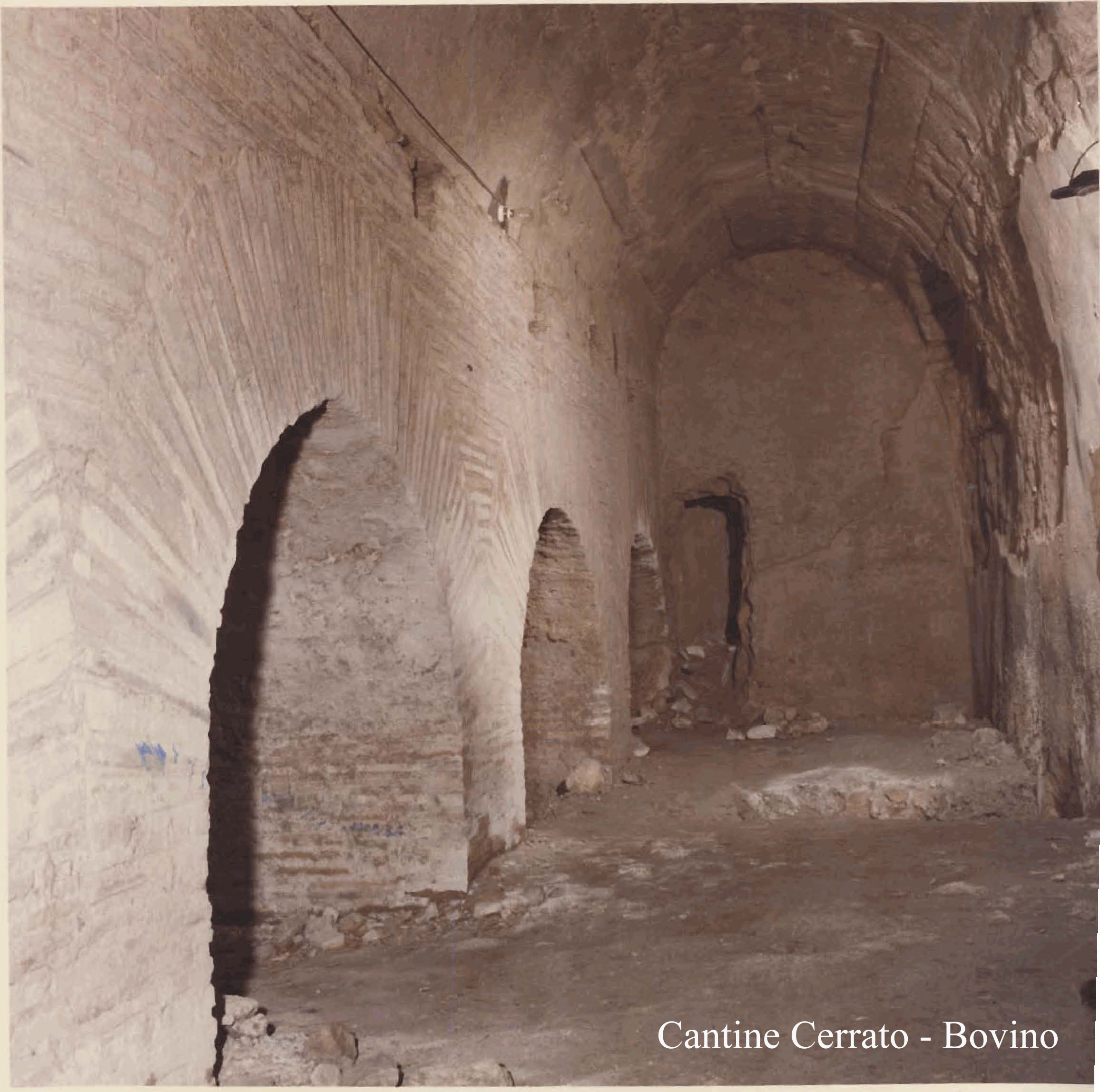
Cerrato Cellars – Room B

The room B, the larger one (18 mx 5.16 m, with a height of 4.95 m), is oriented east-west and sits orthogonal with respect to the room A. With the exception of the eastern side, which separates it from the room A, the other three sides are carved into the rock. As in the room A, all the walls are covered with opus signinum and so it is probably the ground.

The room is divided into two elongated parallel galleries (1.85 m wide and 2.54 m), with barrel vaults separated by a row of six arches (height of about 3.60 m), supported by square pillars (89 cm x 90 cm ) in brick, resting on terracotta slabs (15 cm high).

In addition to the aforementioned conduit, coming from room A, a second semicircle duct along the same wall, of uncertain function, leads to it. At the western corner there are two conduits, one about 1 m wide and 2 m high, facing north, whose opening has the same covering as the cistern; the other one, 45 cm wide, starts at half height and seems to have been created in later times; after a journey of about 20 meters, it reaches a cistern with a diameter of 2.16 m, from which two other pipes branch off, always cut into the rock.

== See also ==
- List of Roman cisterns

== Notes ==
1. ^ The pillars consist of bricks and tiles carefully arranged, bonded with grayish and hard cement mortar; the bricks have a variable thickness between 28 and 32 mm. In the arches, instead, 52 cm long bricks and tiles were used, with a thickness of 6 to 4.5 cm. The joints, between 18 and 23 mm, have been smoothed with a double inclination.
