= Pompeii (novel) =

2003 novel by Robert Harris

- First edition (UK)
- Author: Robert Harris
- Language: English
- Publisher: Hutchinson; Random House (US)
- Publication date: 2003
- Publication place: United Kingdom
- Media type: Hardback, paperback
- Pages: 352 (UK); 274 (US)
- ISBN: 0-09-928261-5
- OCLC: 56641008

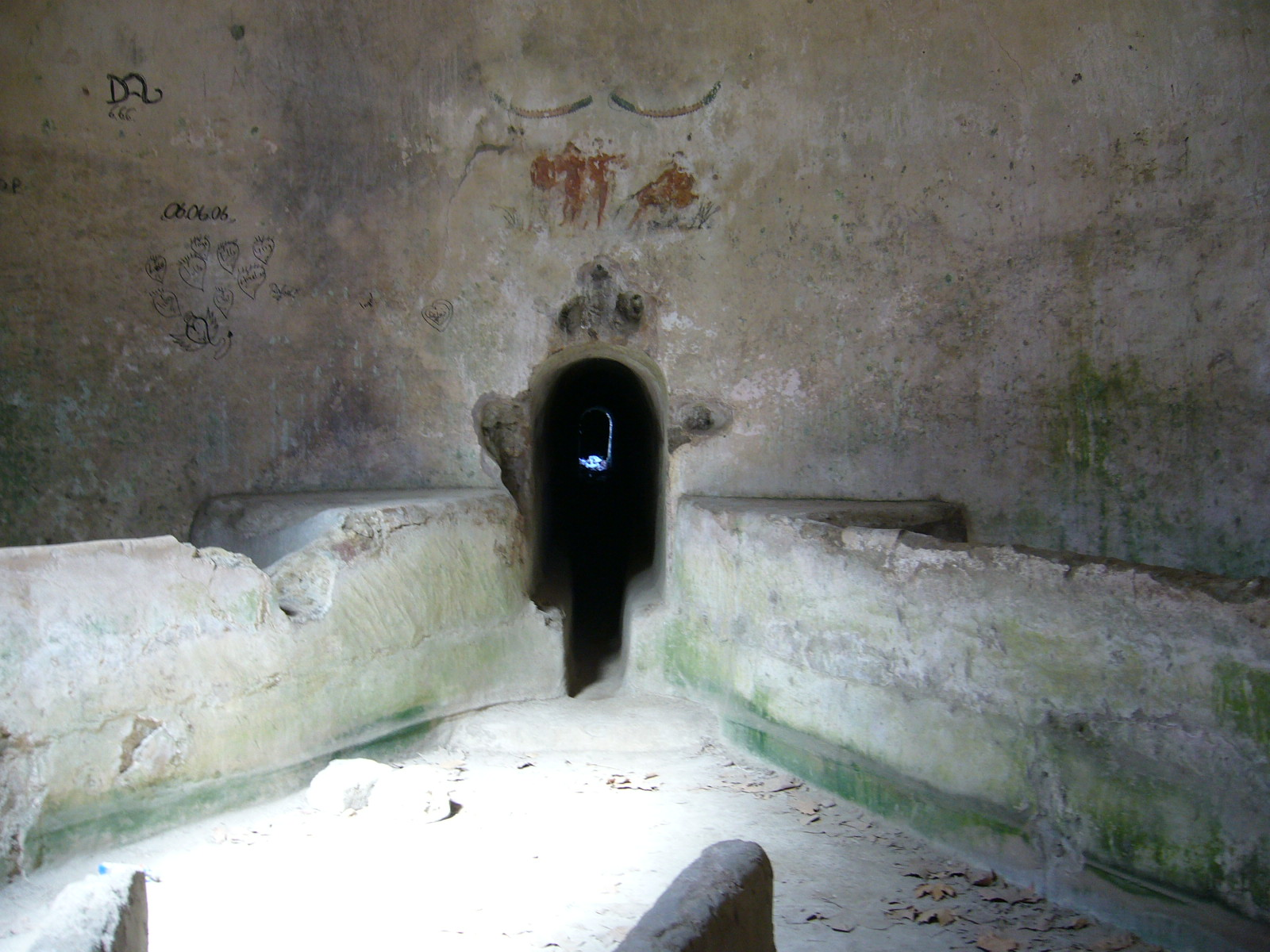
The point at which Attilius and Corelia entered the aqueduct

Pompeii is a novel by Robert Harris, published by Random House in 2003. It blends historical fiction with the real-life eruption of Mount Vesuvius on 24 August 79 AD, which overwhelmed the town of Pompeii and its vicinity. The novel is notable for its references to various aspects of volcanology and use of the Roman calendar. In 2007, a film adaptation was planned, to be directed by Roman Polanski with a budget of US$150 million, but was cancelled due to the threat of a looming actors' strike.

== Plot ==
Marcus Attilius Primus arrives in the Bay of Naples from Rome to take charge as aquarius (hydraulic engineer) of the Aqua Augusta, the aqueduct that supplies water to the towns in the region encompassing the Bay of Naples and Mount Vesuvius. The nine important towns are, in order, Pompeii, Nola, Acerra, Atella, Napoli, Puteoli, Cumae, Baiae, and Miseno. Attilius's predecessor, Exomnius, has mysteriously vanished as the springs that flow through the aqueduct begin to fail, which reduces the supply of water available to the region's reservoir. Attilius is unpopular among the workers, particularly Corax, who resents the young foreigner giving him orders. Attilius's concerns about the water are heightened when he is summoned by a young, wealthy woman, Corelia, to investigate water that apparently killed her father's prized fish. Corelia's father is the former slave and land speculator Numerius Popidius Ampliatus, who came to fortune after he rebuilt Pompeii from a past earthquake. Ampliatus feeds to eels the slave he deems responsible for the fish's death for his own amusement. Attilius realises that unusually, sulfur poisoned the water.

Dramatically, the flow of water then stops entirely. Attilius concludes that the aqueduct must be blocked somewhere close to Mount Vesuvius since reports claim a shutdown of the system just before Nola. That means that towns from there through Napoli and Misenum are without any water supply. With aid from Pliny the Elder, whose fleet is docked at Misenum, Attilius assembles an expedition to travel to Pompeii, the closest town still being supplied with water, and then on to the blocked section of the Aqua Augusta.

While Attilius' expedition is there, he becomes embroiled in a plot by Ampliatus. Ampliatus plans to offer a cheap water supply to Pompeii, which Exomnius had helped him to do while he steals from the imperial treasury. Ampliatus tries to persuade Attilius to fill in Exomnius's role, but he refuses.

Attilius's questions and studies make Ampliatus suspicious, and the latter makes arrangements for Attilius to be assassinated. Attilius begins to suspect Ampliatus of bribery, suspicions that are supported by what Pliny the Elder and his nephew later discover: thousands of Roman sesterces at the bottom of the reservoir that should have gone to Rome. Attilius's predecessor had intended to retrieve them once he had emptied the reservoir. Corelia gets Attilius the proof that he needs from her father's written records when he is performing repairs to a collapsed section of tunnel in the region around Vesuvius. Attilius also discovers that Exomnius was investigating the phenomena around Vesuvius since he recognised some of them from his hometown of Catania after an eruption of Mount Etna. While exploring Vesuvius on his own, Attilius discovers Exomnius's corpse in a pit of earth choked by noxious fumes, which also kills Corax, who has come to assassinate Attilius.

The eruption of Mount Vesuvius on 24 August overwhelms Pompeii, Oplontis, and Herculaneum. Attilius risks his life and comes back to Pompeii to find Corelia. A deranged Ampliatus refuses to evacuate, first holds his family and then Attilius captive and believes that he will become even richer and more powerful by rebuilding the city once more after it is destroyed. Attilius rescues Corelia but is pursued by Ampliatus and his men, even as pyroclastic flows begin to descend on Pompeii. Attilius and Corelia enter the aqueduct and dig their way to safety. Ampliatus is killed by the overwhelming heat of the pyroclastic flow, along with the rest of his family and the rest of the expedition. Pliny dies from the effects of the fumes while he tries to evacuate the household of a friend at the nearby town of Stabiae.

Pompeii is buried underneath rocks, pumice, ash, and volcanic material and leaves few survivors. The last sentence of the novel reports a local legend that a man and woman had emerged from the aqueduct after the eruption, which implies that Attilius and Corelia likely survived the trip up the aqueduct.

The incident of Ampliatus feeding a slave to his eels is based on the actual historical case of Vedius Pollio.

== Comparison with the United States ==
The novel's motto combines two quotes, from Tom Wolfe's Hooking Up and from the Natural History of Pliny the Elder (who, as noted, is a central character in the book itself), with both writers speaking in nearly identical terms of the preeminence of, respectively, the present United States and the Roman Empire, over the rest of the world.

The theme of comparing ancient Rome to the contemporary United States is repeated throughout the book, for example in the deliberate use of typically American terminology, as when Attilius regards Pompeii as "a hustling boomtown" while Ampliatus boasts that "I am the man who runs this town."

Attilius himself is an example of a "modern" character, a proponent of the problem solving approach – a pragmatic engineer, who has little use for religion or gods but confidence in the ability of sound Roman engineering and science to solve problems – given a thorough knowledge of natural laws, good planning and a firm leadership, all of which he is capable of providing.

== Cancelled film adaptation ==
In 2007, together with studio, Harris wrote a screenplay based on Pompeii for director Roman Polanski. Harris acknowledged in many interviews that the plot of his novel was inspired by Polanski's film Chinatown, and Polanski said it was precisely that similarity that had attracted him to Pompeii. The film, to be produced by Summit Entertainment, was announced at the Cannes Film Festival in 2007 as potentially the most expensive European film ever made, set to be shot in Spain. Media reports suggested Polanski wanted Orlando Bloom and Scarlett Johansson to play the two leads. The film was cancelled in September 2007 due to delays caused by location and script problems as well as fears of a looming actors' strike.

== See also ==
- Aqua Augusta (Naples)
- Piscina Mirabilis
