= Aqua Augusta (Naples) =

Aqueduct

Coordinates: 40°47′43″N 14°04′49″E

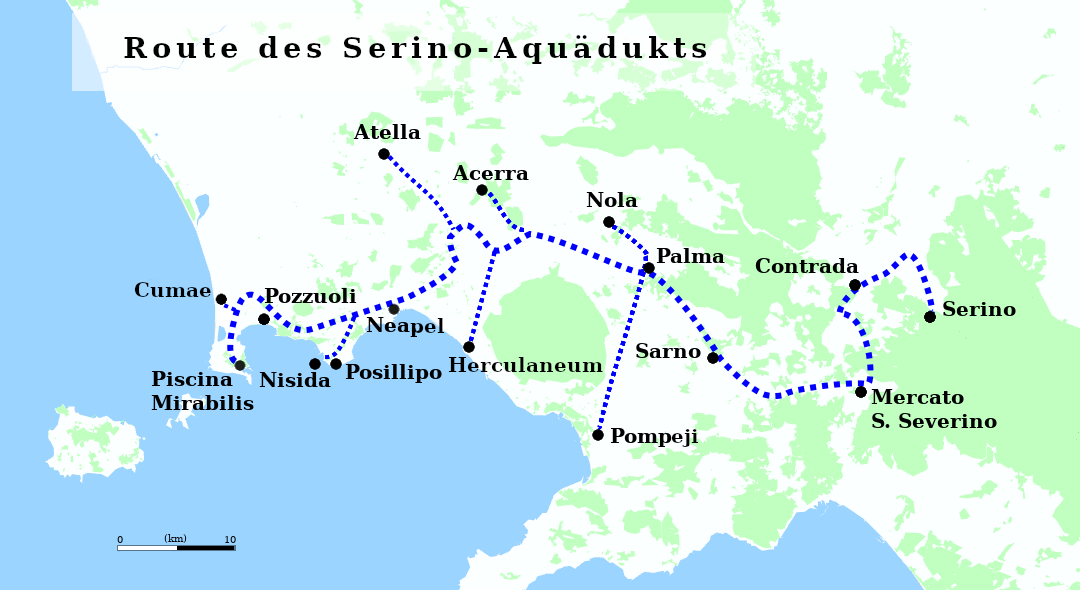
Route and branches of the Serino Aqueduct

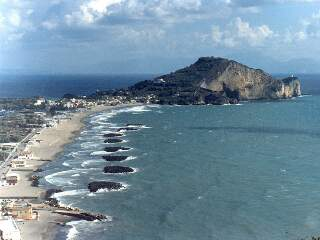
End of the aqueduct at Cape Misenum

The Aqua Augusta, or Serino Aqueduct (Italian: Acquedotto romano del Serino), was one of the largest, most complex and costliest aqueduct systems in the Roman world; it supplied water to at least eight ancient cities in the Bay of Naples including Pompeii and Herculaneum. This aqueduct was unlike any other of its time, being a regional network rather than being focused on one urban centre.

== Route of the aqueduct ==
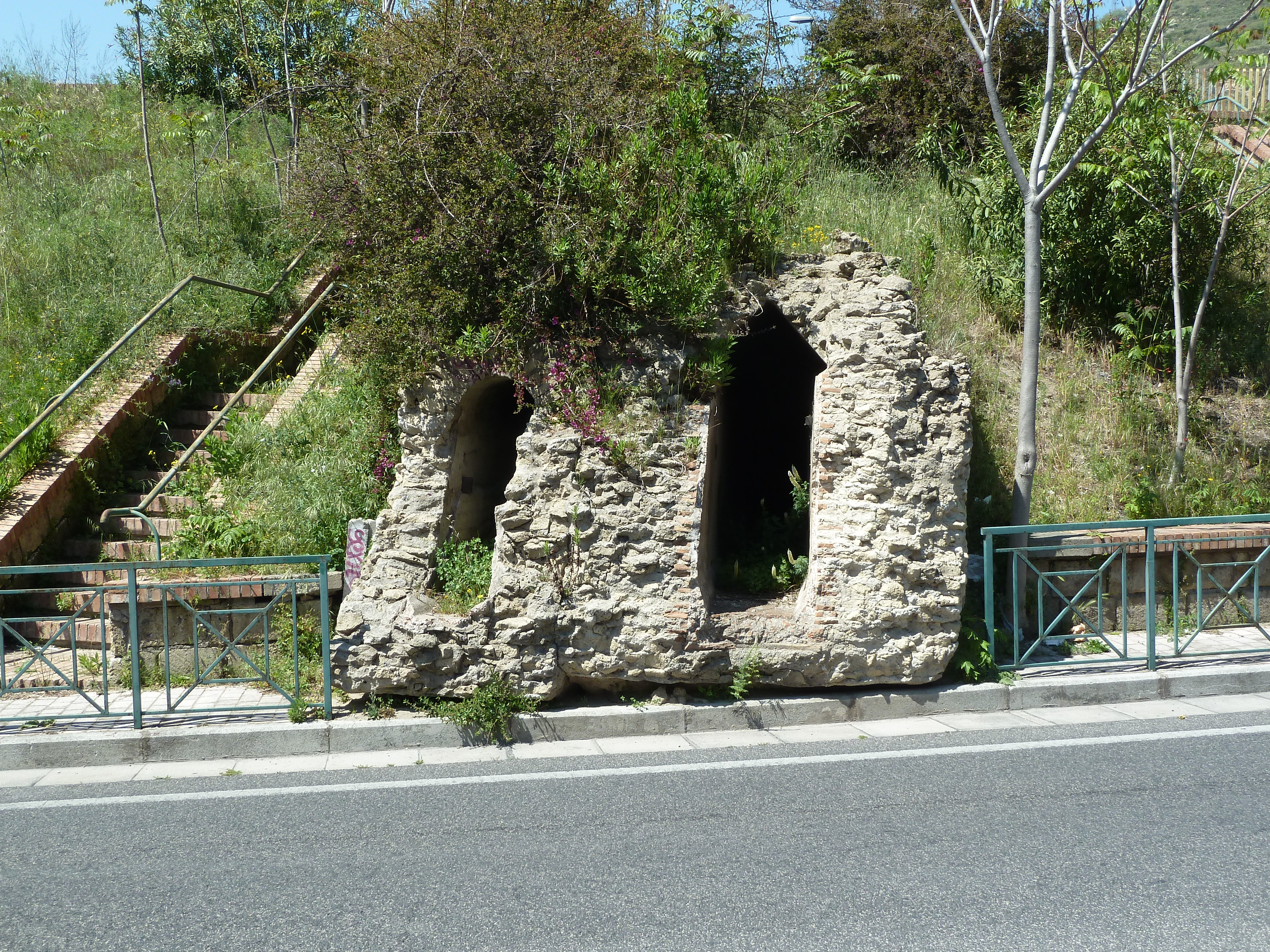
Twin aqueduct tunnels at Pozzuoli

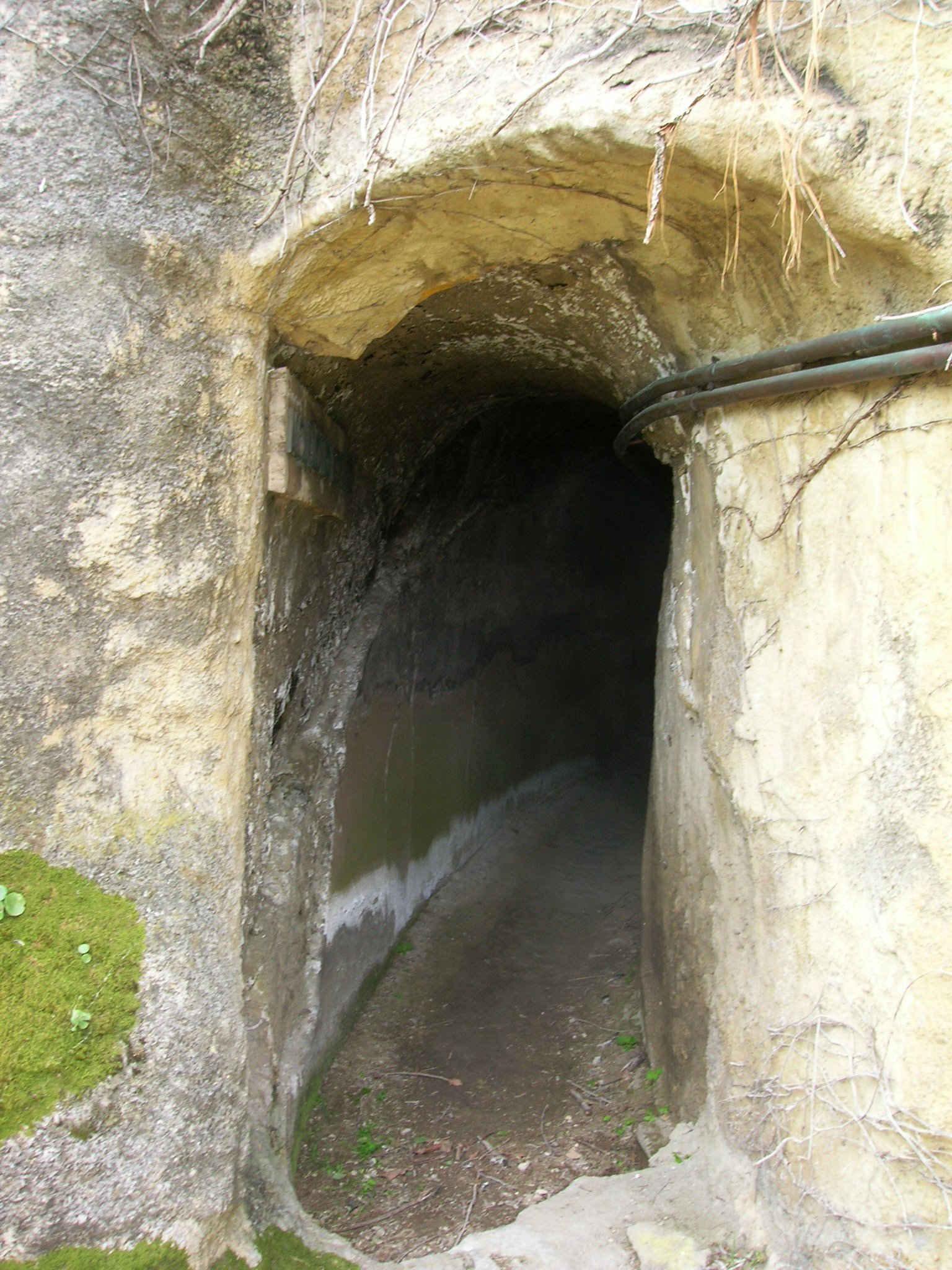
At the Crypta Neapolitana Roman road tunnel

The eastern parts of the route of the aqueduct are well known thanks to the writings of two Italian engineers, who were asked to see if it could be brought back in use as the main water supply of Naples in the 16th and 19th centuries. The western part beyond Naples was less known until recent research.

There were ten branches, seven of which were for cities while three were for some of the numerous luxurious villas in this area popular with rich Romans, such as the Villa Pollio at Posillipo. Including the branches, the total length of the aqueduct was approximately 145 km (90 mi), making it the longest Roman aqueduct system in the Roman world, with the possible exception of the Gadara Aqueduct, until the 5th century AD when the Valens Aqueduct was extended in Constantinople. The Aqua Augusta was one of the most difficult and costly aqueducts ever constructed by an ancient civilisation due to its length and the difficult terrain it crossed. Despite its size and complexity, the Aqua Augusta is today largely unknown as a major monument because most of it is underground.

The aqueduct's main source (caput aquae), the Fons Augusteus (now known as Acquaro-Pelosi) where an inscription was found, was in the Terminio-Tuoro mountains near the modern town of Serino not far from the city of Avellino and at 376 m above sea level. It is likely that there were several supplementary sources at other points in the network, including the branches from Avellino and at Scalandrone near Baiae. One of its main terminations was the enormous Piscina Mirabilis cistern at the naval base and port of Misenum.

Since the aqueduct traversed such a distance, many difficulties were encountered when building it: several long tunnels were cut through mountains; the 6 km-long (3.7 mi) Monti di Forino tunnel crossed a watershed in the Apennines (one of the longest Roman tunnels), and a 2 km-long (1.2 mi) tunnel crossed into the Sarno plain; also at the Crypta Neapolitana road tunnel and the Grotta di Cocceio road tunnel. A 3.5 km-long (2.2 mi) raised section on arches was built at Pomigliano d’Arco. There was ground movement due to seismic activity and a sea crossing was needed to the island of Nisida.

The aqueduct passed underground 400m south of the Roman baths at Agnano with its own branch, and a few metres north of the amphitheatre of Pozzuoli with a 70m branch to the aqueduct.

== History ==
The Serino aqueduct was constructed during the Augustan period of the Roman Empire, probably from 33 BC when Marcus Vipsanius Agrippa (close friend and ally of Emperor Augustus) was curator aquarum in Rome, principally in order to refurnish the Roman fleet of Misenum and secondarily to supply water for the increasing demand of the important commercial harbour of Puteoli as well as for big cities such as Cumae and Neapolis.

There is evidence that a large number of private users were members of the Rome senatorial class. In Rome, a letter from the emperor was required to gain a private connection and so it seems that imperial favour was also a factor in accessing the Augusta's water.

During the war with Sextus Pompey, Augustus ordered the construction of the Portus Julius harbour just west of Puteoli. Later, this harbour was seen as less ideal because of silting problems and a new major naval base was built further west at Misenum to become the basis of the western Mediterranean fleet. Large quantities of fresh water were needed for the base itself and for the ships which may have been one of the reasons the new aqueduct was built.

Such a major structure required constant maintenance; there were major repairs in the Flavian period (1st century AD) with the addition of parallel tunnels and the Emperor Constantine also engaged in a massive restoration documented on an inscription tablet discovered in Serino and dated to AD 324. Its text proved that the aqueduct dated to Augustus and not to Claudius as previously thought.

The destinations listed on the tablet are: Nola, Acerrae, Atella, Naples, Pozzuoli, Baiae, Cumae, and Misenum. The cities of Pompeii, Herculaneum and Stabiae were also originally supplied by the aqueduct but, being buried by the eruption of Mount Vesuvius in 79 AD, they did not appear on this list.

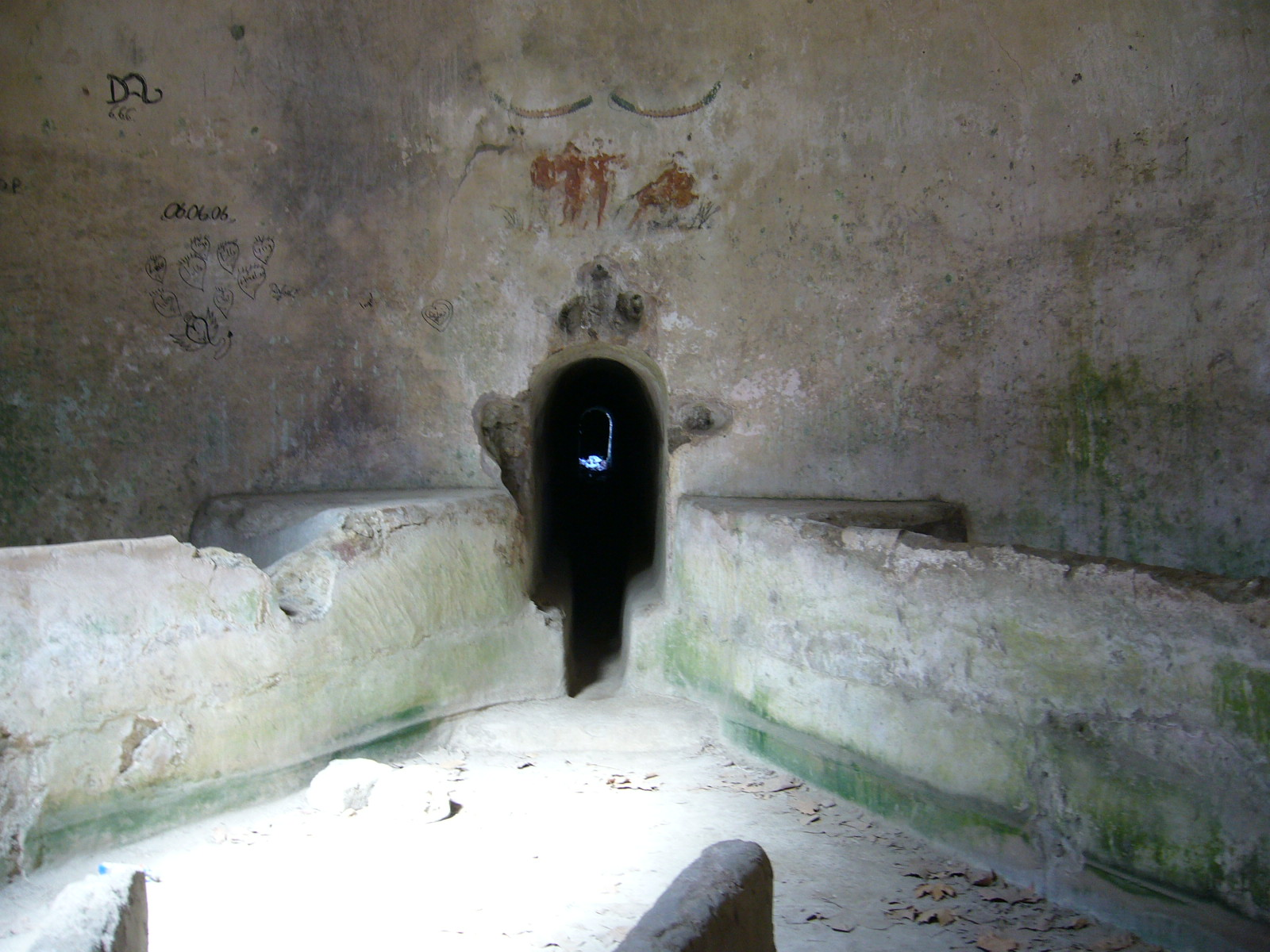
The spur from the Aqua Augusta entering the castellum aquae in Pompeii

The next major eruption in 472 AD left the aqueduct covered in ash, and 3.5 km (2.2 mi) of the duct, the Pomigliano d’Arco arcade, collapsed prior to the actual eruption. This cut off the supply of water to all the towns except Nola and Acerrae. The poor administrative and economic situation in Campania at this time, and Italy in general, prevented major repairs to the Augusta and after this time only other aqueducts in the area were referred to.

In modern times, parts of the aqueduct including the Piscina Mirabilis were vital to the region's survival as air-raid shelters during World War II.

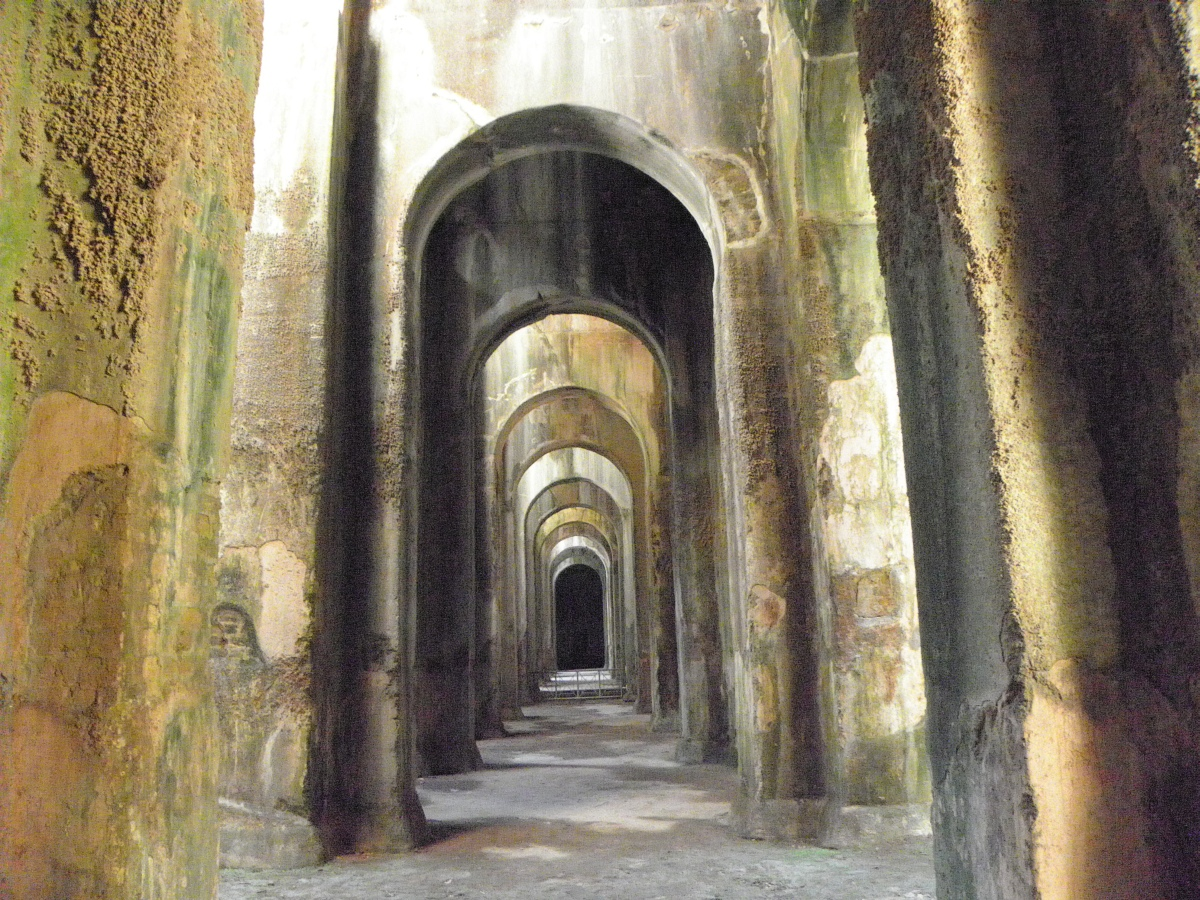
The Piscina Mirabilis

== Visible remains ==
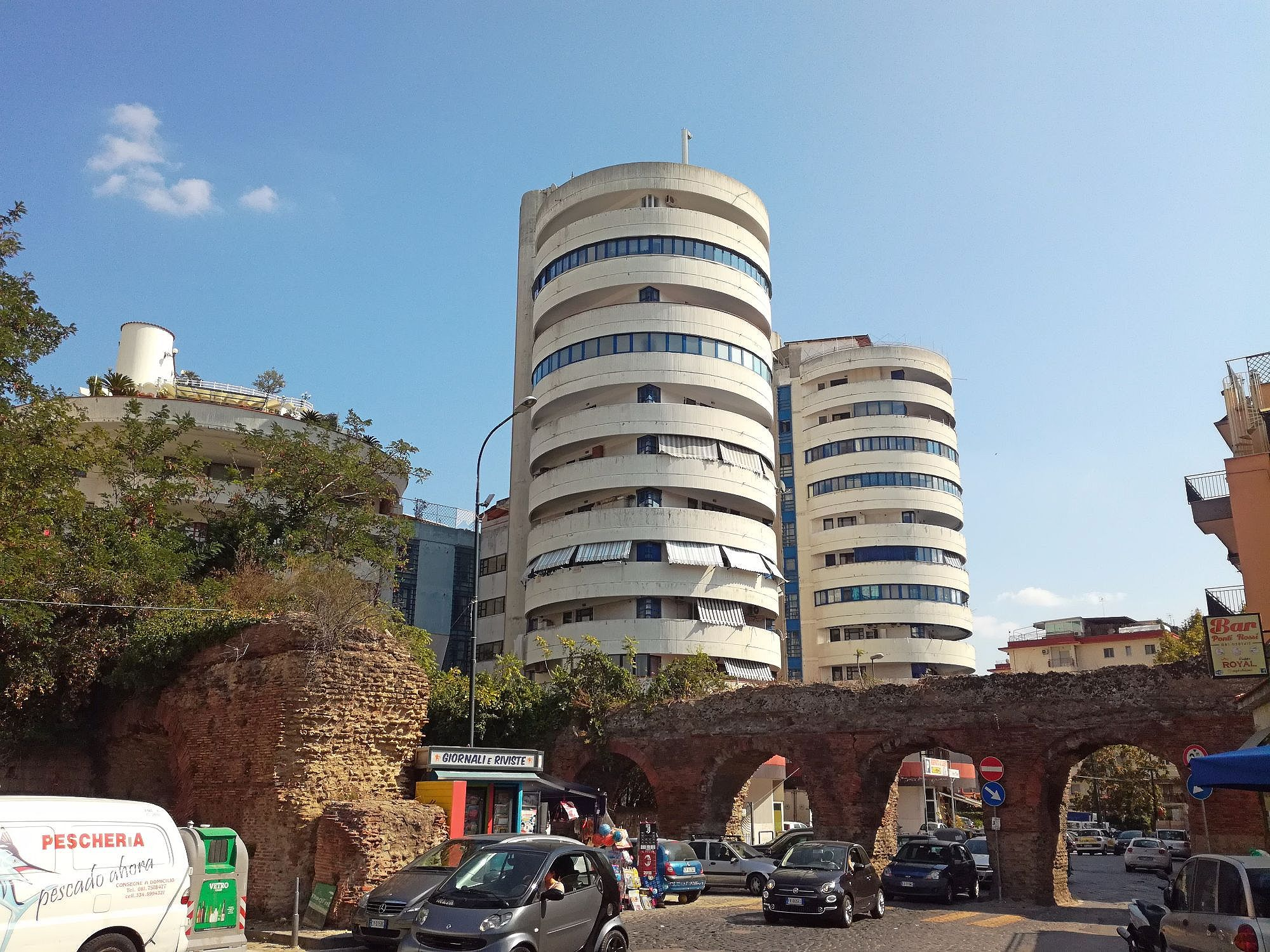
Twin bridges at Ponti Rossi, Napoli

There are few visible remains of the aqueduct today, although much of it still exists below ground. Traces of the original structure may be found at a number of sites in and around Naples.

These include:

- supporting wall for arches of a raised aqueduct section at Muro d'Arce near via Muro d'Arce, Sarno
- "Ponte Tirone": two parallel sections in Palma Campania (Tirone District),
- the two parallel Ponti Rossi aqueduct bridges
- a section next to the Crypta Neapolitana in the Parco Vergiliano at Piedigrotta where it occupied a parallel tunnel
- a branch to the Pozzuoli amphitheatre and the main aqueduct to the north
- a water catchment cave near Scalandrone, comune di Bacoli.
- a section next to the entrance to the Baia archaeological park.
- the well-preserved Piscina Mirabilis at Misenum. This is one of the largest such reservoirs on an aqueduct known in the Roman Empire and survives almost intact to this day. It was probably intended for a large villa, or possibly as a strategic water resource for the naval base though it lies about 1 km (0.62 mi) distant.

=== In basements between via Arena and vico Traetta ===
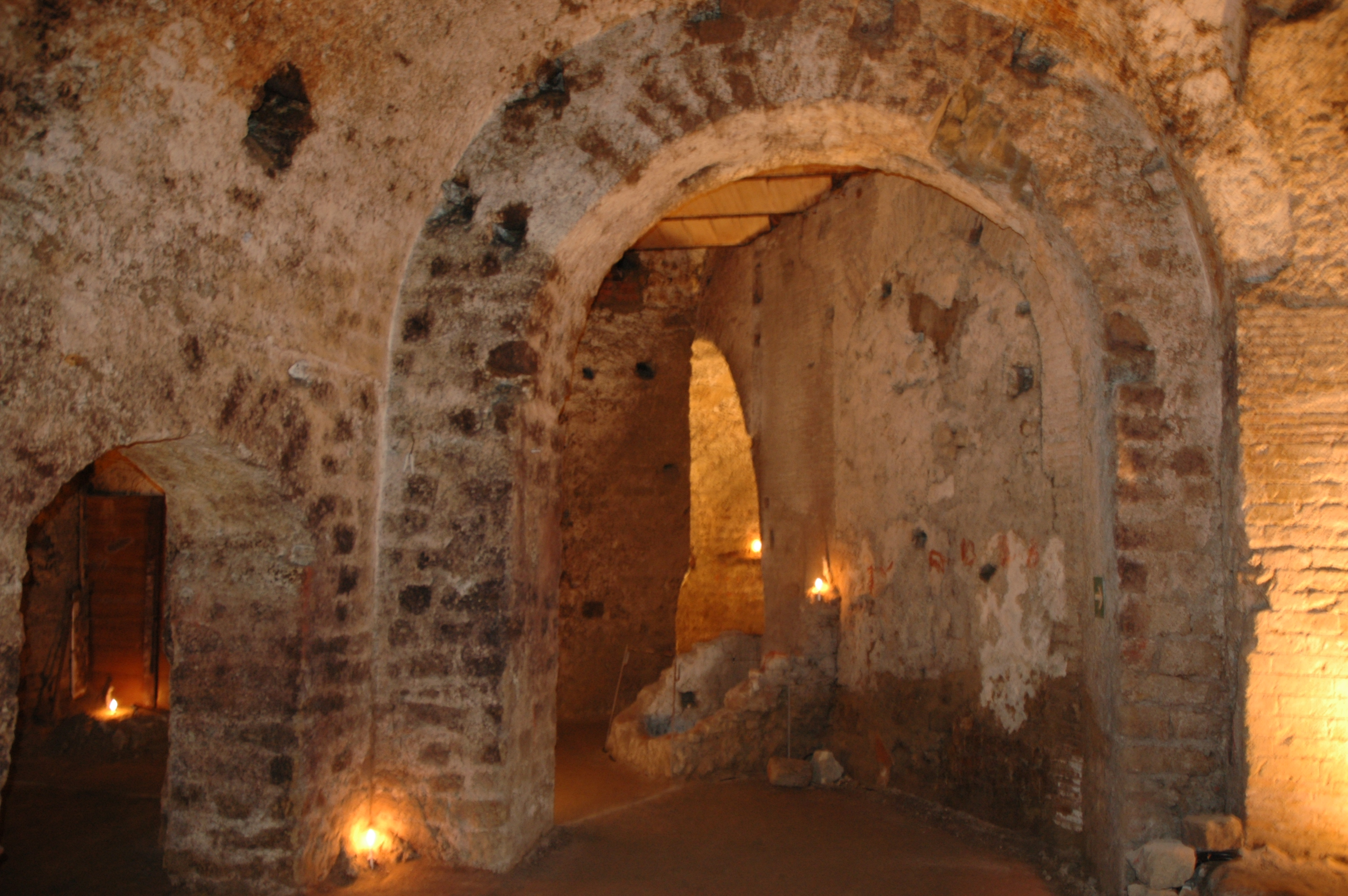
Arches in basement of Via Arena

Recently, arches of the twin aqueduct have been revealed in cellars of buildings in Rione Sanità, in 6 via Arena alla Sanità, and are open to the public. They run from north to south for a long section at a separation of 10m and then come as close as 2m in the southern part. The western channel is Augustan, whereas the eastern part was added later.

They sparked increased interest in research, which has led to more exploration of the line of the monumental aqueduct. An immense cistern on the line of the channels has been found next to the Hellenistic necropolis. Also a new piece of the ancient aqueduct has been identified uphill from via Foria in the “Miracoli” district where the channel runs underground for 220 m.

== Literary depictions ==
It features prominently in the novel Pompeii by Robert Harris, whose protagonist is a water engineer ("Aquarius") sent from Rome to maintain the aqueduct in AD 79 during the time around the eruption of Mount Vesuvius.

== See also ==
- Roman aqueducts
- Roman engineering
- Roman technology
- List of Roman cisterns
