= List of Roman cisterns =

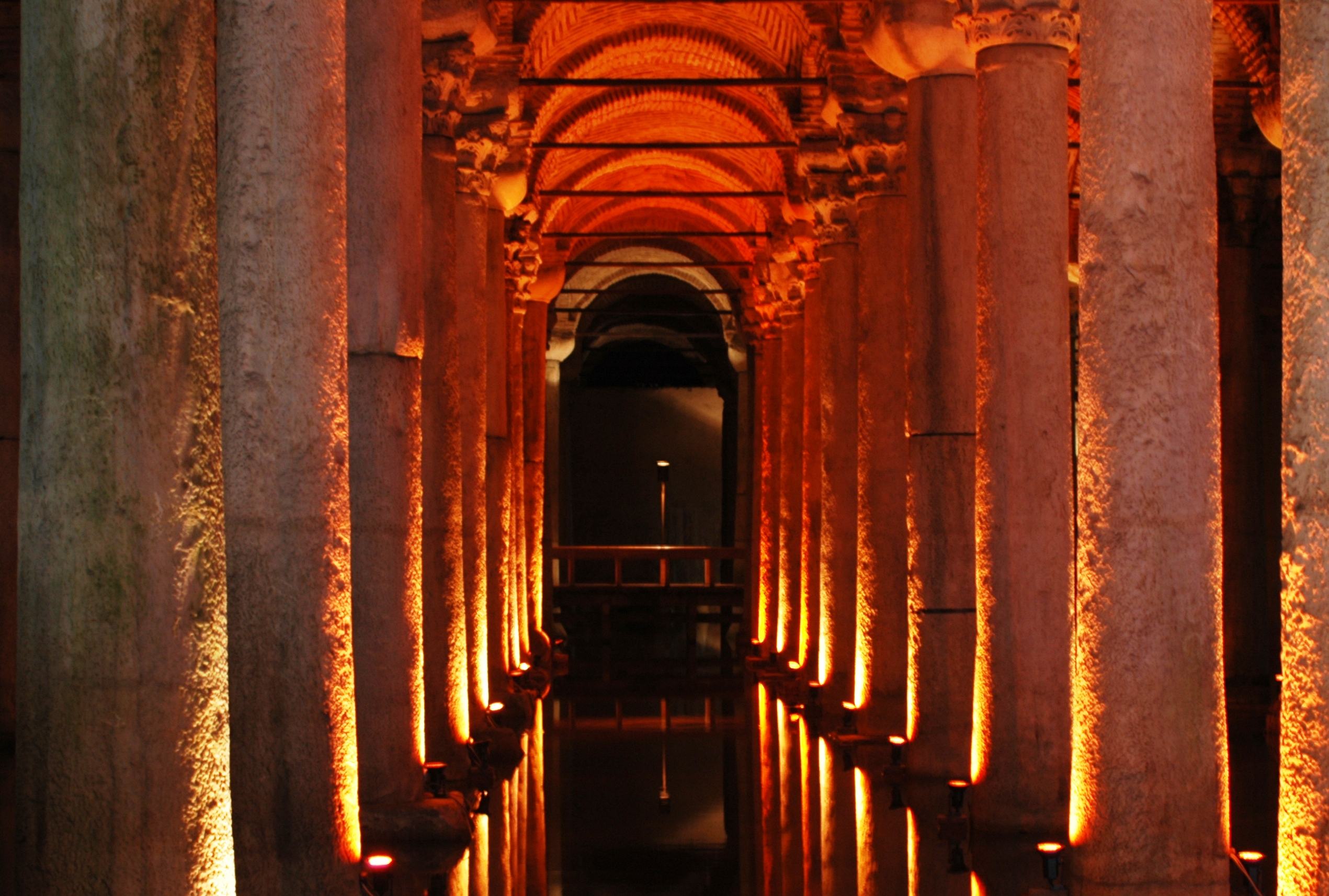
The Basilica Cistern in Constantinople provided water for the Imperial Palace.

The list of Roman cisterns offers an overview over Ancient Roman cisterns. Freshwater reservoirs were commonly set up at the termini of aqueducts and their branch lines, supplying urban households, agricultural estates, imperial palaces, thermae or naval bases of the Roman navy.

== Cisterns ==
	Cistern	Location	Country	Water supply	Width (m)	Length (m)	Clear height (m)	Water depth (m)	Capacity (m³)	Volume (m³)
Basilica Cistern	Basilica Cistern or Yerebatan Saray	Constantinople	Turkey	Rainwater harvesting	65	138	9		85,000	
	Bordj el-Djedid	Zaghouan	Tunisia	Aqueduct of Carthage	39	154.6 (oblong)			25,000 to 30,000	
Cistern of Philoxenos	Cistern of Philoxenos or Binbirdirek Cistern	Constantinople	Turkey	Rainwater harvesting	66	65	14 to 15		32,500	
Theodosius Cistern	Theodosius Cistern	Constantinople	Turkey	Rainwater harvesting						
Great Cistern of Masada	Cistern System at Masada (Northern Cisterns)	Judaean Desert	Israel	Rainwater harvesting					40,000	40,000
Piscina Mirabilis	Piscina Mirabilis	Bacoli near Misenum	Italy	Serino Aqueduct	25 (27)	66 (72)	10.3 (±10)	7.5 (?)	10,700 (12,600)	14,300 (?)
Cisterne romane Fermo	Roman cisterns	Fermo	Italy	Rainwater harvesting	30	70	6	0,70	3,000	10,000
	Grotta Dragonara	Bacoli near Misenum	Italy	Rainwater harvesting	70 (6)	72 (60)	9.5 (?)	4.5 (?)	7,700 (?)	11,900 (?)
	Il Cisternone	Albano	Italy							10,132
	Cisternone Romano	Formia	Italy		25	65	6.5			8,000
	Aïn Mizeb	Thugga	Tunisia	Aqueduct						9,000
	Aïn El Hammam	Thugga	Tunisia	Aqueduct						6,000
	Cripta Romana	Cumae	Italy	Serino Aqueduct	31	38	8.0	3.0	2,100	5,300
	Piscina Cardito, Southern Reservoir	Puteoli	Italy	Campanian Aqueduct	16	55	6.0	4.5 (Note: Excavated parts)	4,000	5,300
	Piscina Lusciano	Puteoli	Italy	Serino Aqueduct	25	27	6.5	4.0	2,700	4,400
	Tunnel Cistern (Note: Estimated values)	Baiae	Italy	Rainwater harvesting	3.5	300	3.0	2.0	2,100	2,800
	Cento Camerelle, Upper Reservoir	Misenum	Italy	Rainwater harvesting	18	23	7.8	5.5	2,000	2,450
	Cento Camerelle	Puteoli	Italy	Campanian Aqueduct?	7	70	5.2	2.0	850	2,000
	Cento Camerelle, Lower Reservoir	Misenum	Italy	Rainwater harvesting	2	160	4.0	3.0	960	1,100
	Piscina Cardito, Northern Reservoir	Puteoli	Italy	Campanian Aqueduct	8	34	?	1.3	350	?
	Domitian's Villa	Albano	Italy		11	123				
	Villa Jovis	Capri	Italy							

== See also ==
- Roman architecture
- Roman engineering
- Roman technology

== Sources ==
- Adam, Jean-Pierre (2004), Roman Building. Materials and Techniques, Routledge, ISBN 978-0-415-20866-6
- Döring, Mathias (2002), "Wasser für den 'Sinus Baianus': Römische Ingenieur- und Wasserbauten der Phlegraeischen Felder", Antike Welt, vol. 33, no. 3, pp. 305–319
