= Basilica Cistern =

Ancient cistern beneath Istanbul, Turkey

- Βασιλική Κινστέρνα (Greek); Yerebatan Sarnıcı (Turkish)
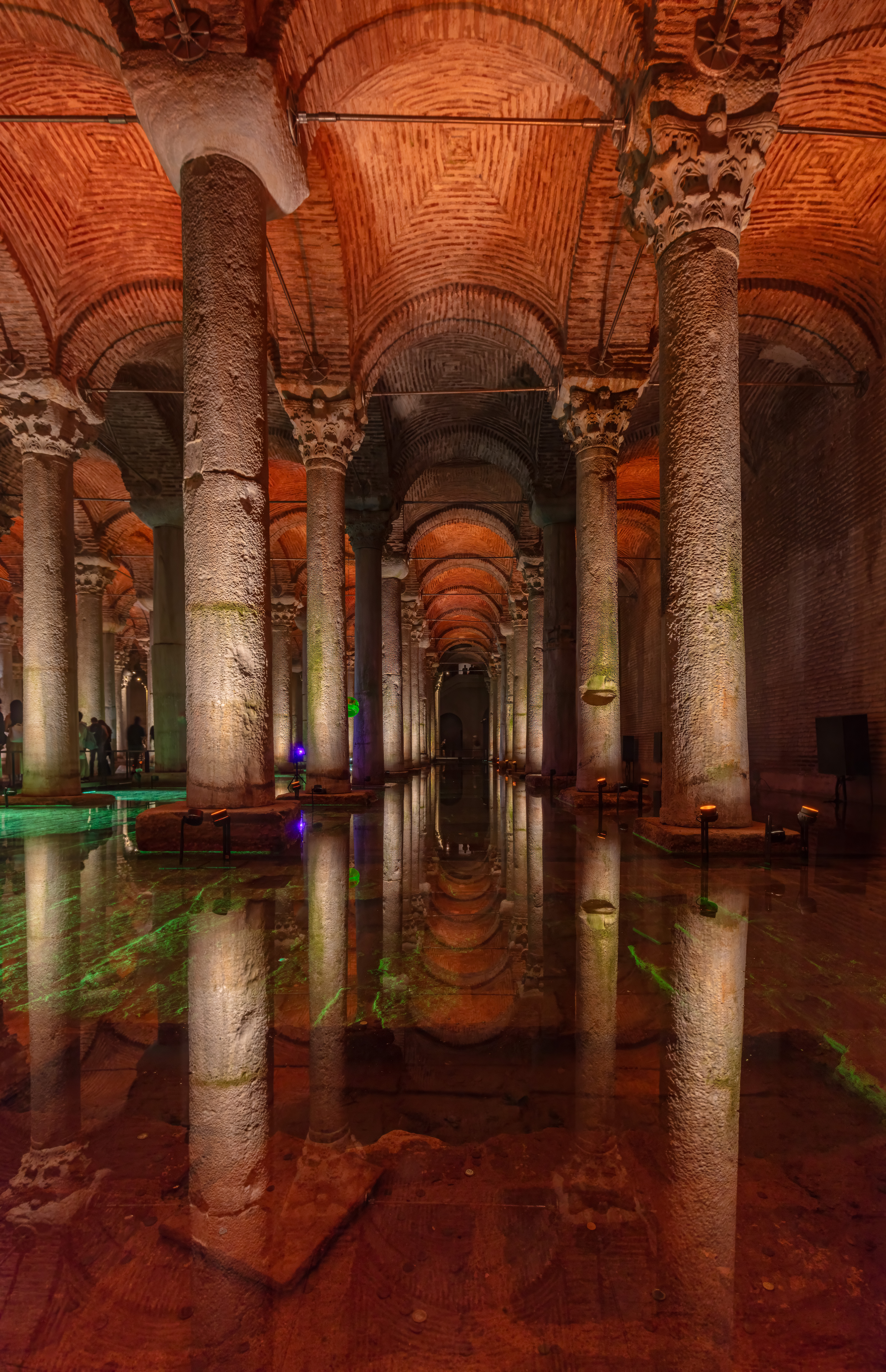
- Basilica Cistern

- Location within Istanbul Fatih Location within Turkey
- Interactive map of Basilica Cistern
- 41°0′29″N 28°58′40″E
- Location: Istanbul

Site notes
- Public access: Yes
- Website: www.yerebatan.com

The Basilica Cistern, or Cisterna Basilica (Greek: Βασιλική Κινστέρνα, Turkish: Yerebatan Sarnıcı or Yerebatan Sarayı, "Subterranean Cistern" or "Subterranean Palace"), is the largest of several hundred ancient cisterns that lie beneath the city of Istanbul, Turkey. The cistern, located 150 metres (490 ft) southwest of the Hagia Sophia on the historical peninsula of Sarayburnu, was built in the 6th century during the reign of Byzantine emperor Justinian I. Today, it is kept with little water for public access inside the space.

== History ==
Prior to the cistern's construction, a great basilica stood on the spot. It had been built during the Early Roman Age between the 3rd and 4th centuries as a commercial, legal, and artistic centre. The subterranean cistern was built in the 6th century during the reign of Byzantine emperor Justinian I. It was called Basilica because it was located under a large public square, the Stoa Basilica, on the First Hill of Constantinople.

Ancient texts indicated that the basilica cistern contained gardens surrounded by a colonnade that faced the Hagia Sophia.

Historical texts claim that 7,000 enslaved people were involved in the construction of the cistern.

The existence of the cistern was eventually forgotten by all but the locals who still drew water from it until, in 1565, the French traveller Petrus Gyllius left a record of it. Gyllius recorded being rowed in between the columns and seeing fish swimming in the water beneath the boat.

=== 1985–1987 works ===
The Istanbul Metropolitan Municipality undertook the first major modern restoration of the Basilica Cistern between 1985 and 1987. More than 50,000 tons of silt were removed from the reservoir, uncovering the Medusa-head column bases. Elevated wooden walkways were introduced, allowing the structure to open to the public as a museum in 1987.

=== 2020–2022 restoration ===
A comprehensive restoration was carried out between 2020 and 2022 by the İBB Miras team. The deteriorated iron tie-rods were replaced with stainless-steel compression rods, anchored with star-shaped plates, to improve seismic resilience.

Concrete walkways and a 50 cm-thick cement render added in the mid-20th century were dismantled. Approximately 1,440 m^{3} of concrete and 1,600 m^{3} of sediment were removed, revealing the original 6th-century Byzantine brick floor beneath.

A new modular steel walkway was installed, physically separated from the historic structure, improving structural performance and visitor experience. Conservation treatments included gentle cleaning of marble and brick surfaces to remove biological growth and salt crystallization.

New LED lighting and sensors were also installed to support atmospheric lighting and non-invasive digital exhibitions.

== Legal status and conservation framework ==
The Basilica Cistern is part of the "Historic Areas of Istanbul," a UNESCO World Heritage Site since 1985. Nationally, it is protected under Turkey's Law No. 2863 on the Conservation of Cultural and Natural Property as a 1st-degree archaeological site.

This classification restricts permanent alterations and mandates that all interventions be reversible and approved by the Istanbul No. 1 Cultural Heritage Preservation Board. In 2011, the board ordered the restriction of heavy vehicle traffic near the site to mitigate vibration-related damage.

== Adaptive reuse and exhibitions ==
In 2022, the Basilica Cistern hosted the digital exhibition Daha Derine ("Going Deeper"), curated by İBB Miras. The exhibition featured contemporary artworks by Jennifer Steinkamp, Ozan Ünal, Aslı İrhan, and Ali Abayoğlu, using projection mapping, sculpture, and light to reflect on the site's themes of memory, mythology, and water.

These installations were temporary, non-invasive, and mounted on reversible infrastructure added during the 2020–2022 restoration.

== Features ==
This cistern is an underground chamber approximately 138 metres (453 ft) by 65 metres (213 ft) – about 9,800 square metres (105,000 sq ft) in area – capable of holding 80,000 cubic metres (2,800,000 cu ft) of water. The ceiling is supported by a forest of 336 marble columns, each 9 metres (30 ft) high, arranged in 12 rows of 28 columns each spaced 5 metres (16 ft) apart. The capitals of the columns are mainly in the Ionic and Corinthian style, with the exception of a few Doric capitals with no engravings. One of the columns is carved with raised pictures of a Hen's Eye, slanted branches, and tears, and resembles the columns of the 4th-century Triumphal Arch of Theodosius I (AD 379–395), erected in the 'Forum Tauri' Square, today's Beyazıt Square. The majority of the columns in the cistern appear to have been recycled from the ruins of older buildings (a process called 'spoliation'), likely brought to Constantinople from various parts of the empire, together with those that were used in the construction of Hagia Sophia. They are carved out of different types of marble and granite.

Fifty-two stone steps descend into the cistern, which is surrounded by a firebrick wall with a thickness of 4 metres (13 ft) and coated with a waterproofing mortar. The Basilica Cistern's water came from the Eğrikapı Water Distribution Centre in the Belgrad Forest, which lies 19 kilometres (12 mi) north of the city. It traveled via the 971-metre-long (3,186 ft) Valens (Bozdoğan) Aqueduct, and the original 115-metre-long (377 ft) Mağlova Aqueduct, which was built by the Emperor Justinian.

The Basilica Cistern has been restored several times since its original creation. The first repairs were carried out in the 18th century during the reign of the Ottoman sultan Ahmed III in 1723 by the architect Muhammad Ağa of Kayseri. The second major repair was completed during the 19th-century reign of Sultan Abdulhamid II (1876–1909). Cracks in the masonry and damaged columns were repaired in 1968, with additional restoration in 1985 by the Istanbul Metropolitan Museum. During the 1985 restoration, 50,000 tons of mud were removed from the cistern, and platforms were erected to replace the boats previously used for touring the cistern. The cistern was opened to the public on 9 September 1987. It underwent additional cleaning in May 1994. Then, in 2017, it was once again closed for restoration and earthquake-proofing, reopening to the public in 2022.

== Medusa column bases ==
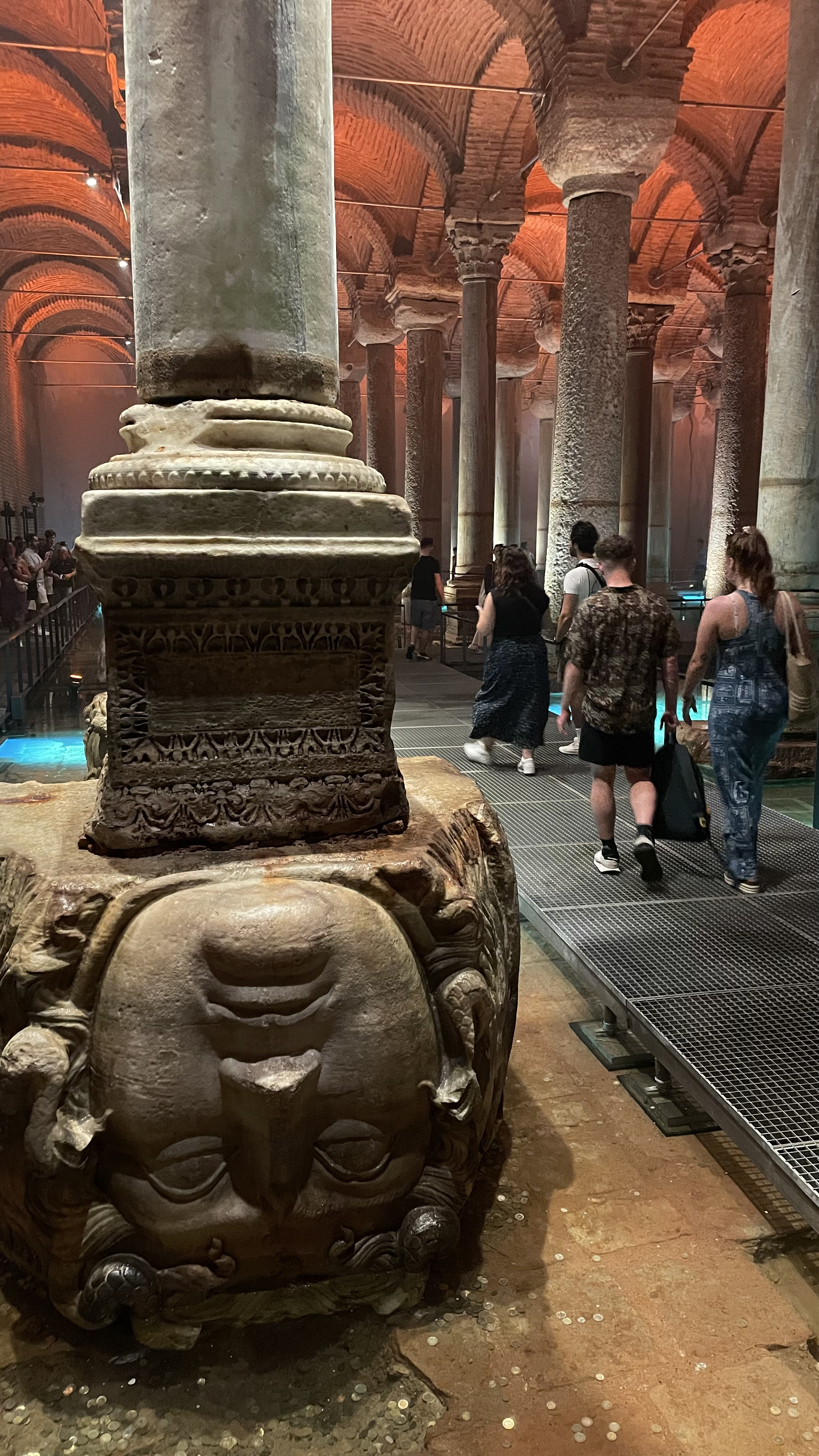
The second Medusa head pillar

The bases of two columns in the northwest corner of the cistern reuse blocks carved with the face of Medusa. The origin of the two heads is unknown. However, it is thought that they were brought to the cistern after being removed from a building of the late Roman period. There is no evidence to suggest that they were previously used as column bases.

== In popular culture ==
The cistern was used as a location for the 1963 James Bond film From Russia with Love.

In the fantasy series The Old Kingdom by Garth Nix, the reservoir beneath the palace in Belisaere was inspired by the cistern.

In the 2011 video game, Assassin's Creed: Revelations, the player-controlled character, Ezio Auditore, is given the chance to explore a section of this cistern in a memory sequence entitled The Yerebatan Cistern.

The cistern with its inverted Medusa pillar featured in the 2013 Dan Brown novel Inferno (as well as its 2016 film adaptation).

== Gallery ==
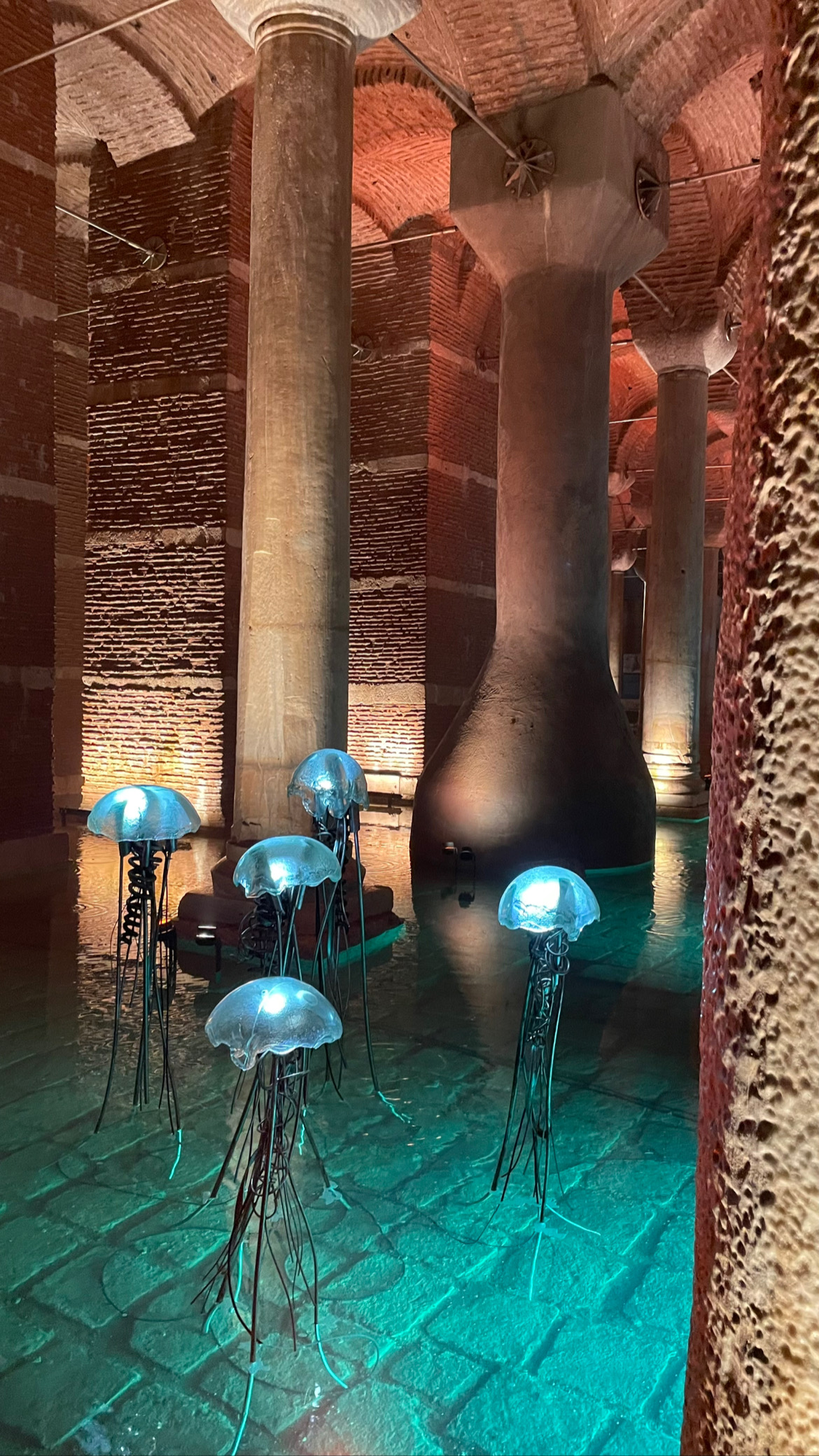
Statues in Basilica Cistern

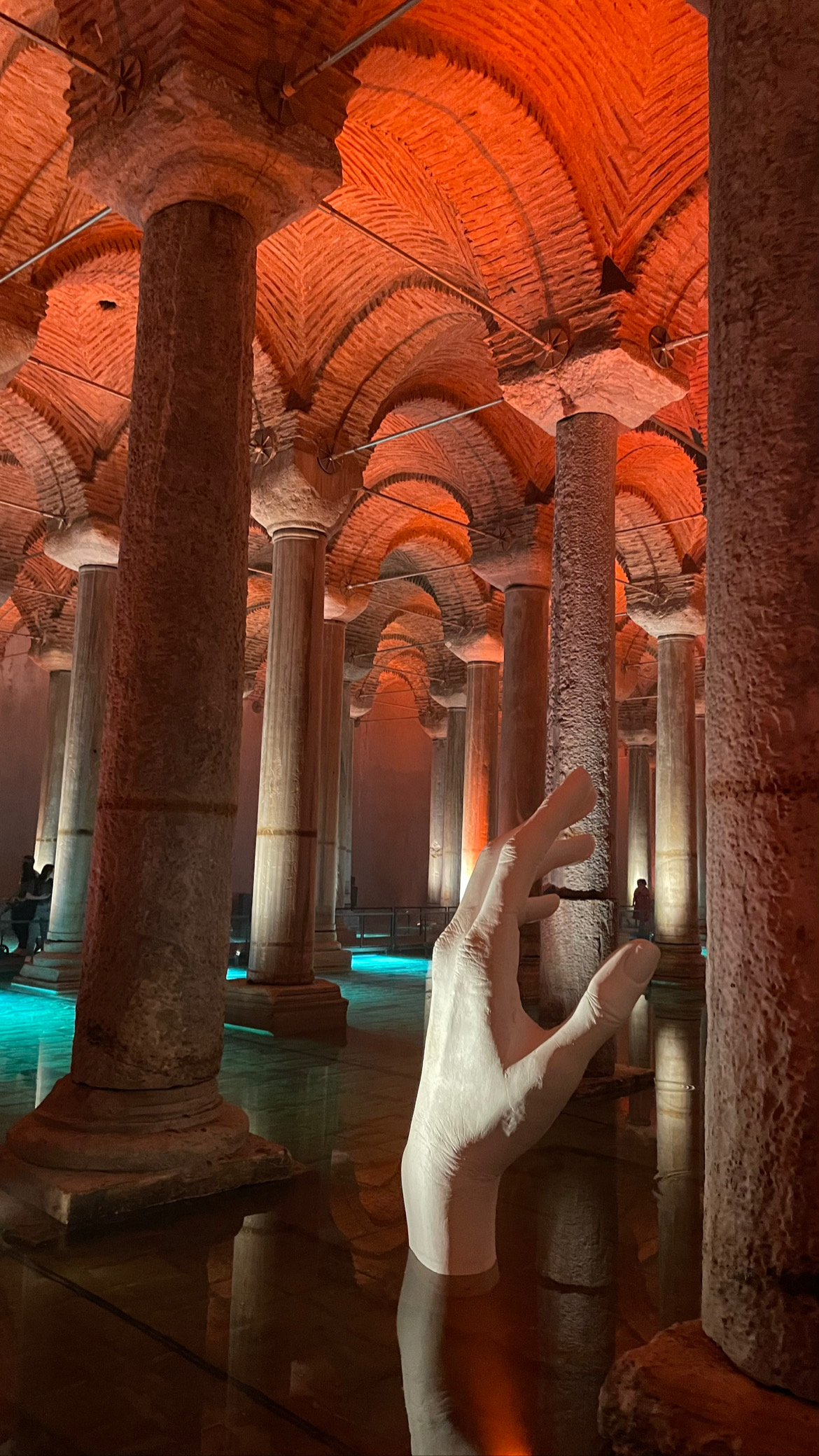
Art installation inside Basilica Cistern

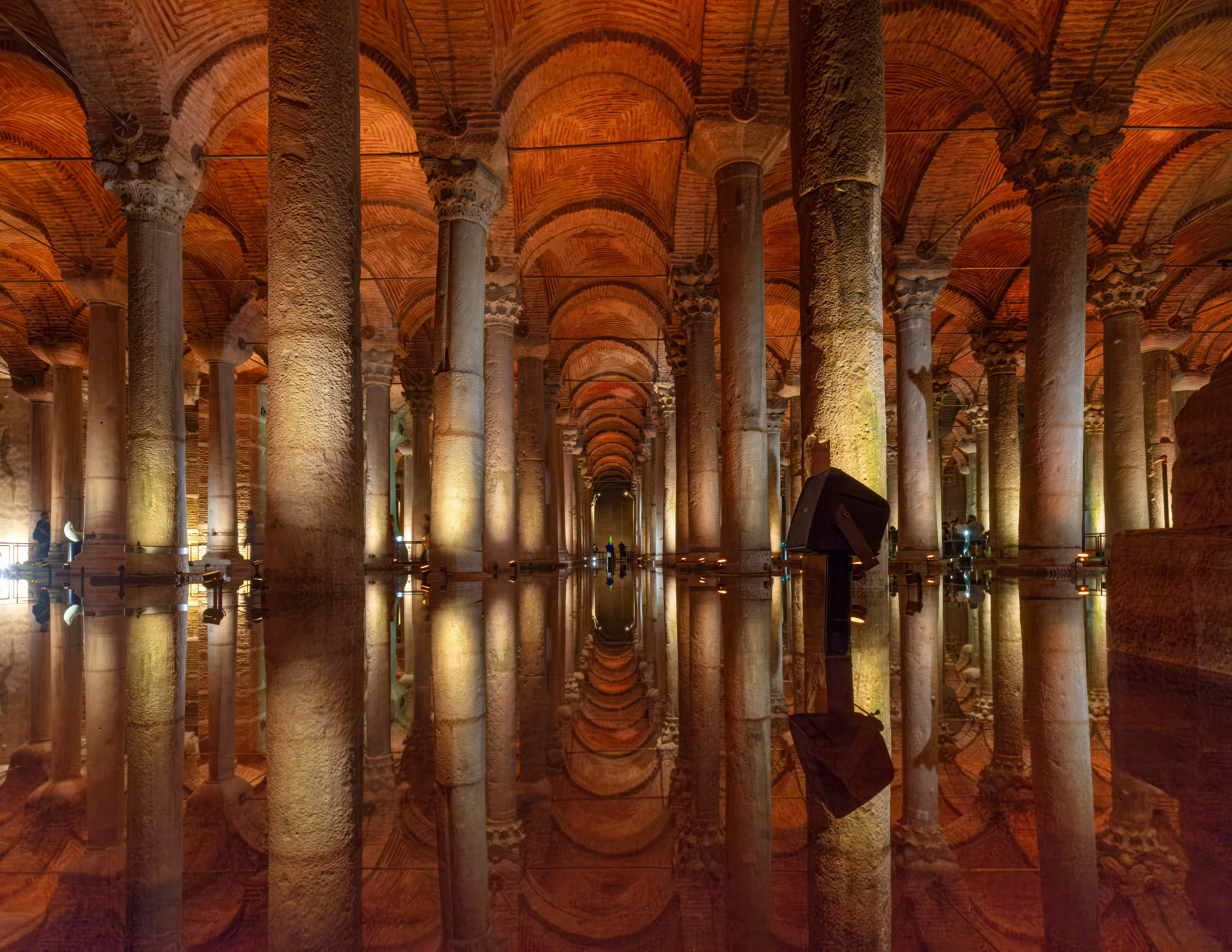
Columns and vaults of Basilica Cistern

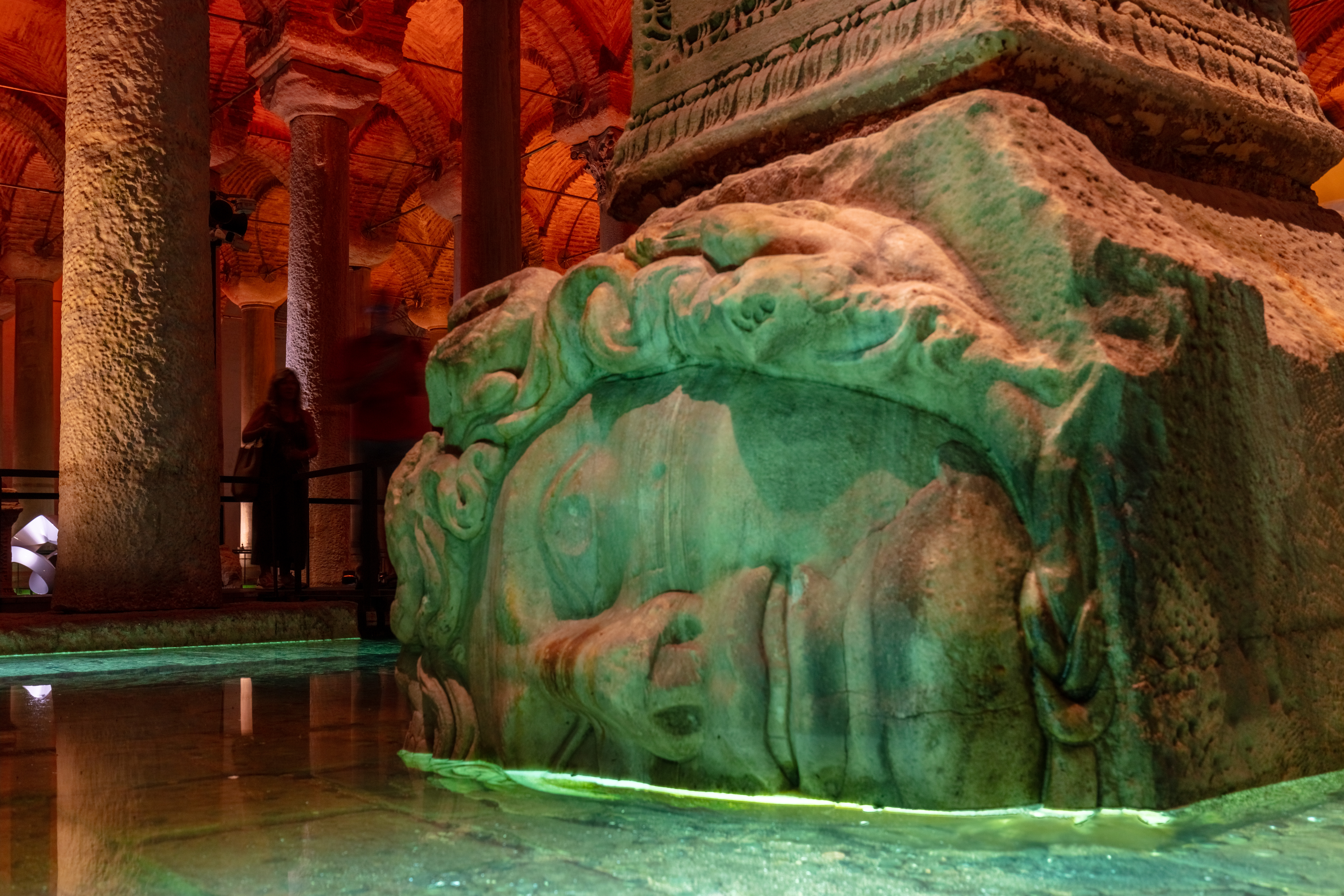
Medusa head

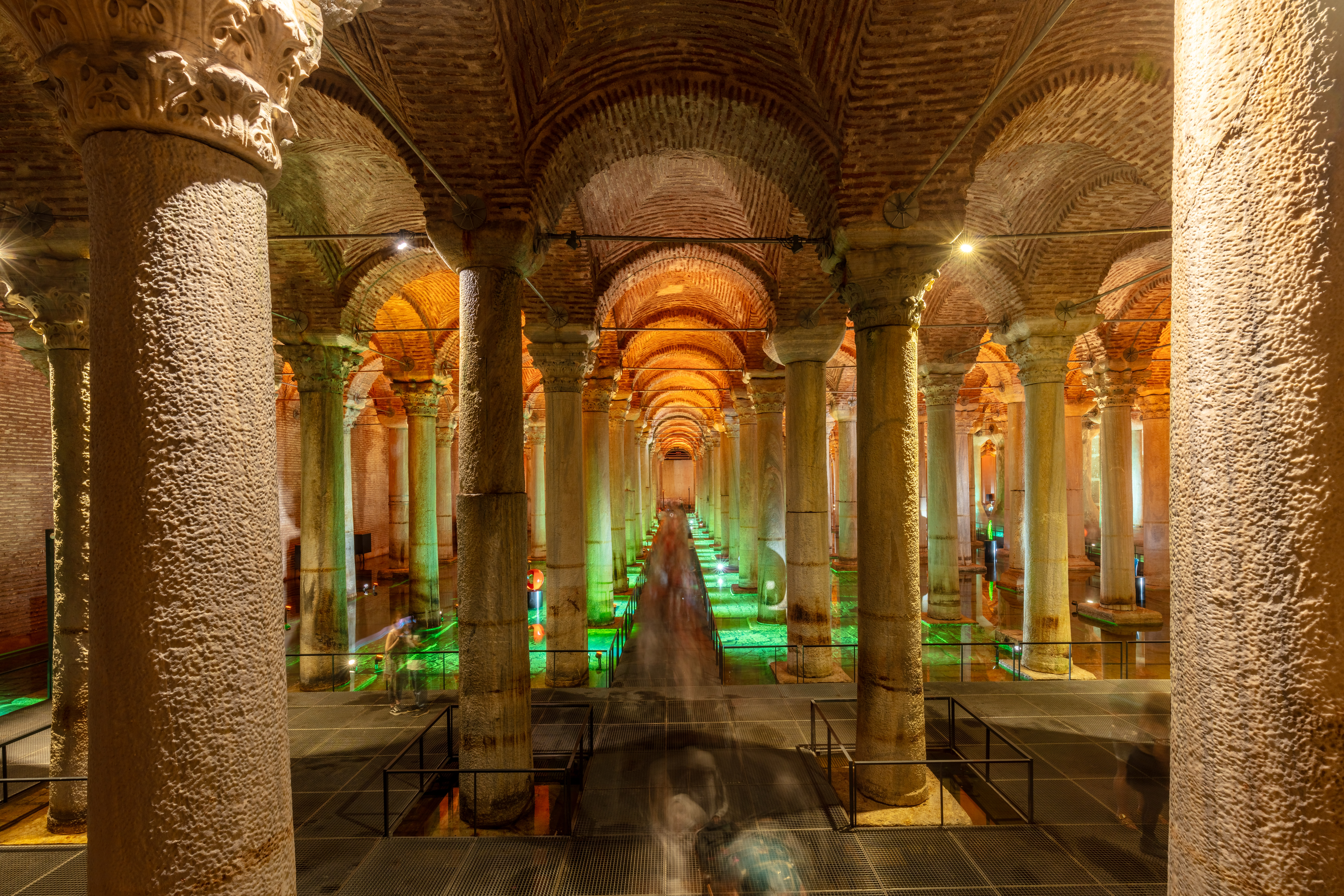
Atmospheric lighting now brightens up a visit to the Basilica Cistern

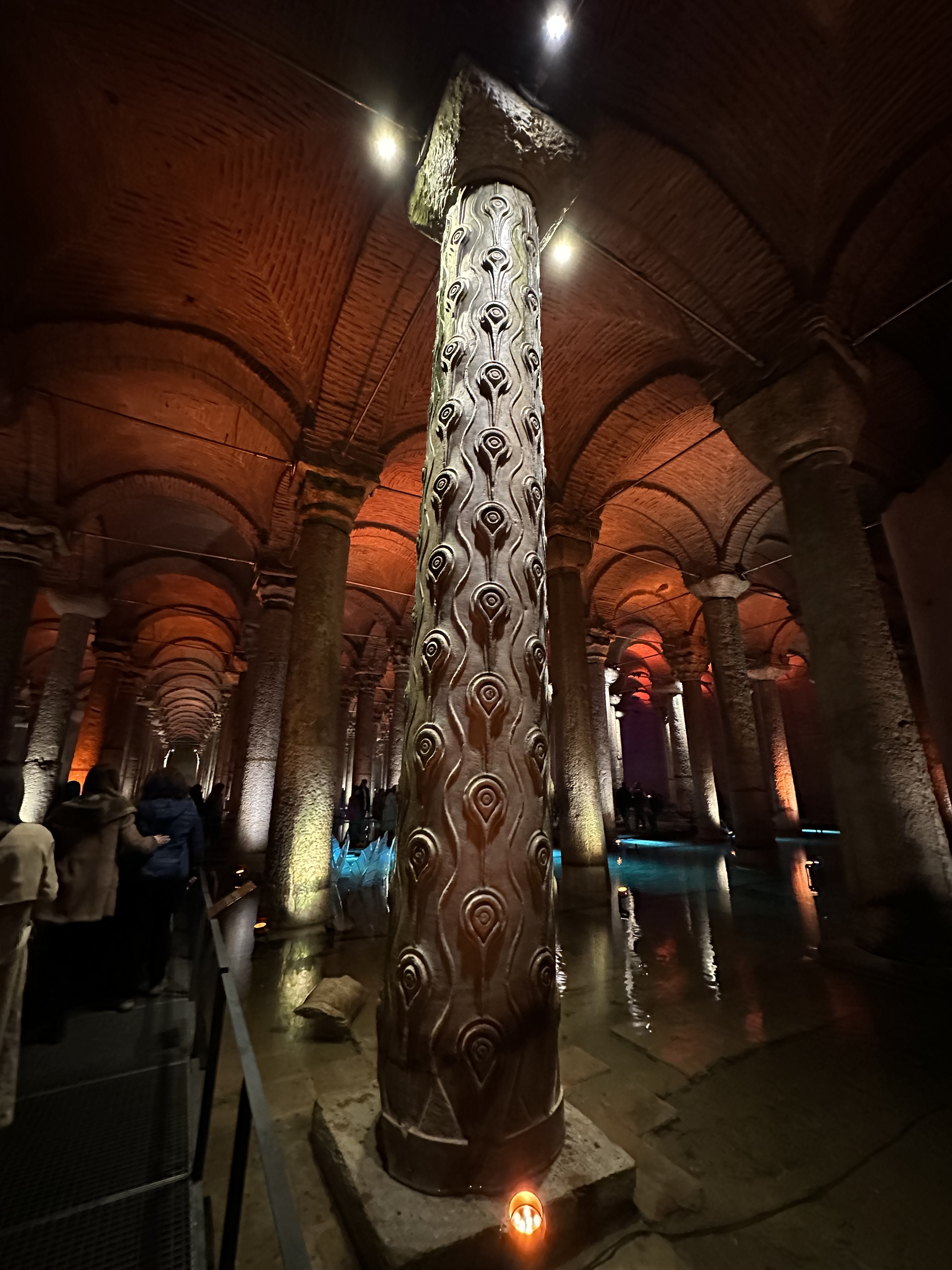
Unique "peacock-eyed" column in the Basilica Cistern

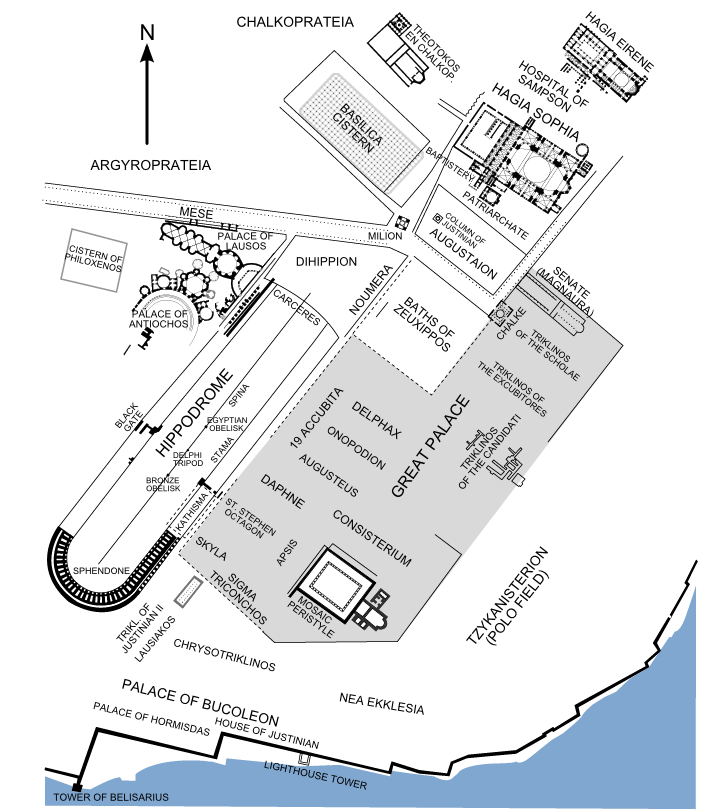
Cisterna Basilica is located to the west of Hagia Sophia and is of a similar size. The square on the left of the map marks the location of the Cistern of Philoxenos.

== See also ==
- Cistern of Philoxenos (Istanbul)
- Ancient Roman and Byzantine domes
- List of Roman cisterns
- Theodosius Cistern (Istanbul)
