= Theodosius Cistern =

Ancient cistern in Istanbul, Turkey

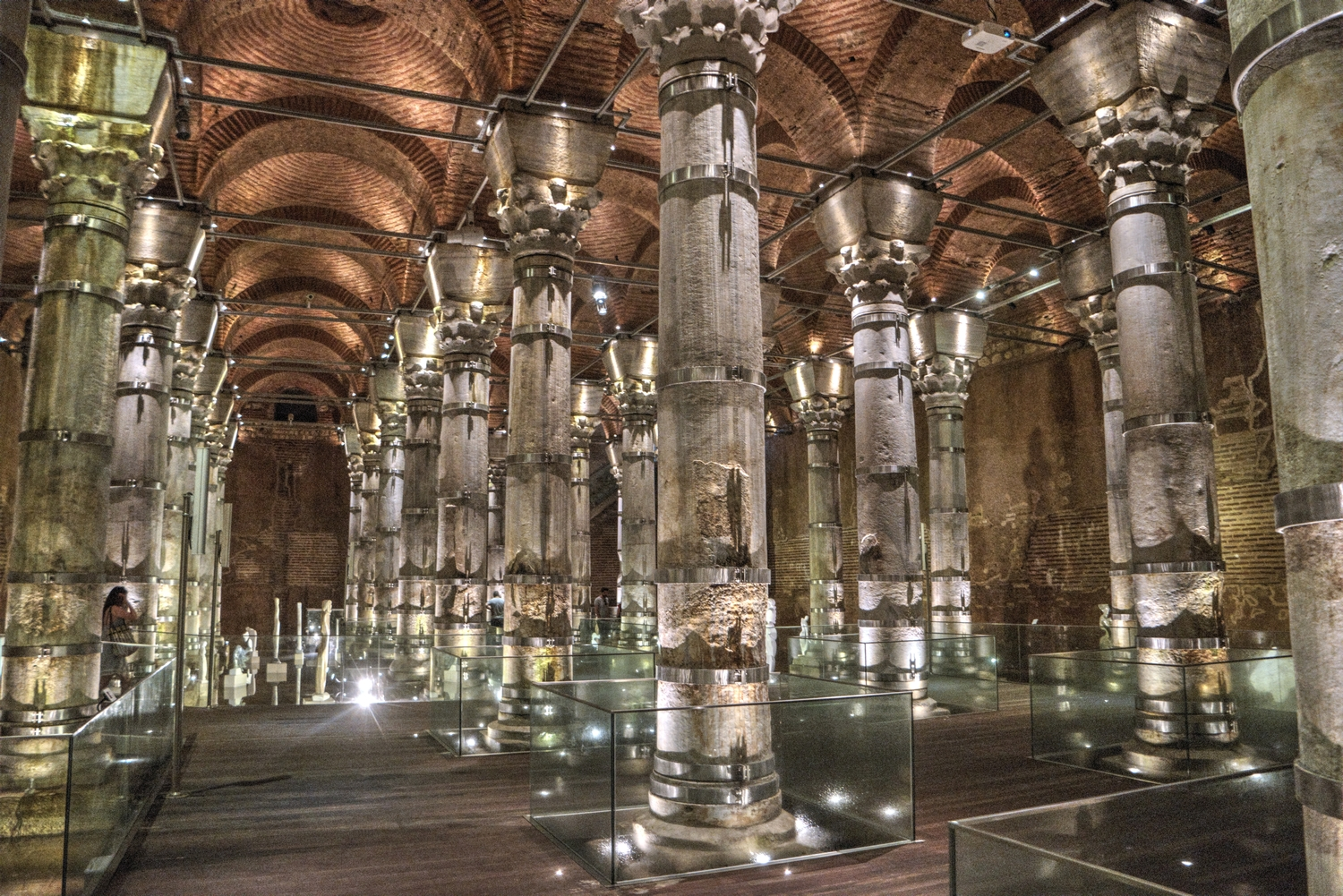
- Theodosius Cistern

- Position of the cistern Theodosius Cistern (Turkey)
- 41.00725°N 28.9726°E
- Type: Cistern
- Location: Fatih, Istanbul

History
- Built: 428–443
- Abandoned: 15th century

Site notes
- Height: 11 m (36 ft)
- Length: 40 m (130 ft)
- Width: 20 m (66 ft)

The Theodosius Cistern (Greek: Κινστέρνα Θεοδοσίου, Turkish: Şerefiye Sarnıcı) is one of many ancient cisterns of Constantinople that lie beneath the city of Istanbul, Turkey. The modern entrance is in Piyer Loti Caddesi, Fatih.

== Background ==
Constantinople had insufficient water resources. Since the Lycus river running through the historic Peninsula of Constinople was not an efficient water supplier, water had to be brought from outside of the city. Storing water was needed also due to population density and the sieges suffered. During centuries, the city built and used a great number of open-air and roofed cisterns.

== History ==
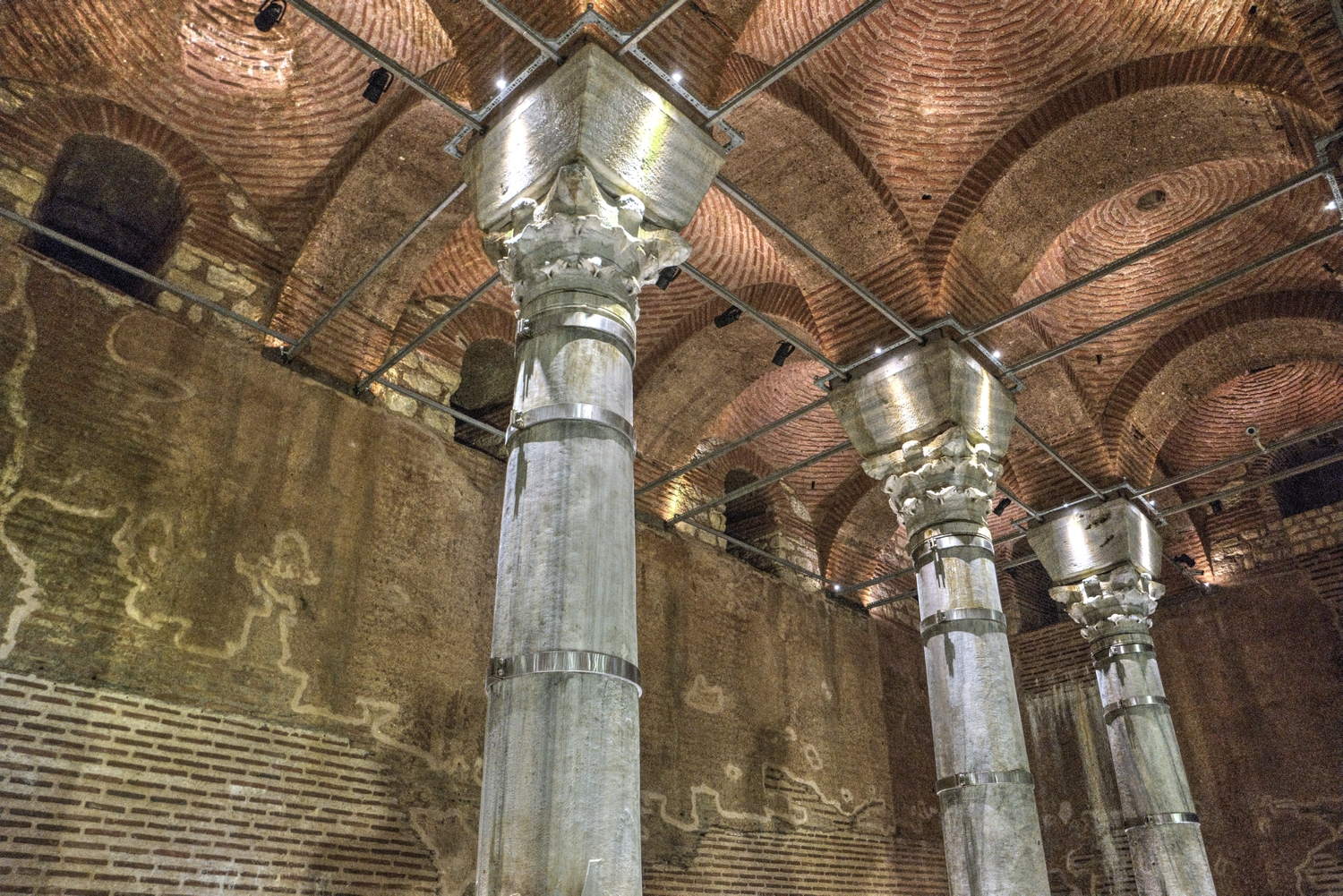
Arches of the Theodosius Cistern .

The cistern was built by Roman Emperor Theodosius II (r. 402–450) between 428 and 443 to store water supplied by the Valens Aqueduct. Water from the Aqueduct of Valens was redistributed by the Theodosius Cistern from its original supply to the Nymphaeum, the Baths of Zeuxippus and the Great Palace of Constantinople.

== Architecture ==
The cistern area is about 20 by 40 m (66 by 131 ft), and the roof with 45 sail vaults is supported by 32 marble columns about 11 m (36 ft) high. All column capitals are of Corinthian order with stylized acanthus leaves bearing impost blocks above. The marble of the columns was brought from Marmara Island. The interior walls of the cistern are covered with waterproof plaster, and its corners are curved to withstand water pressure. The wall thickness is around 2.5 m (8 ft 2 in).

== Ottoman Empire era ==
During the Ottoman Empire era, cisterns were not in use because still water was considered as unhealthy.

Yet sometime around the late 18th or early 19th century, its existence was completely forgotten after a large private estate was built on the site, which was used by the municipality services from 1912 on, and it lay hidden for many years.

== Today ==
In 2010, the cistern was rediscovered under the building when Istanbul Metropolitan Municipality demolished the annex building. Locally, it is named Şerefiye Cistern after the neighborhood it is situated.

Like the Basilica Cistern and the Binbirdirek Cistern, it is once again open to the public, having been under restoration for eight years as of April 2018.

The 360-degree projection mapping system integrated in the cistern structure offers the visitors an extraordinary museum experience.

== See also ==
- List of Roman cisterns
