= Miseno =

Place on the north shore of the Bay of Naples, of Italy

Coordinates: 40.7867°N 14.0842°E

Location of Miseno in Italy.

Miseno is one of the frazioni of the municipality of Bacoli in the Italian Province of Naples. Known in ancient Roman times as Misenum, it is the site of a great Roman port.

== Geography ==
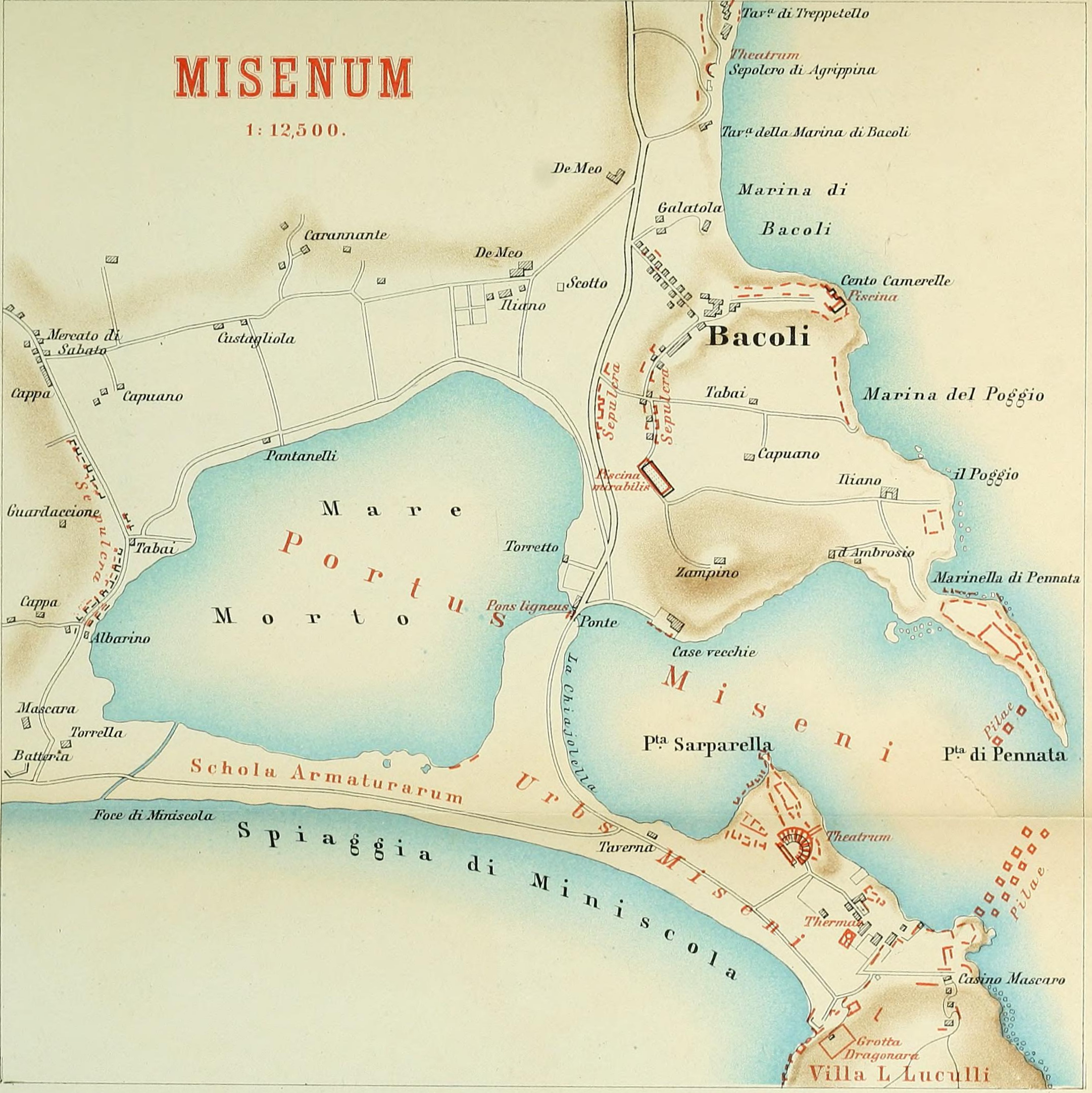
Map of Roman monuments 1890 (Beloch)

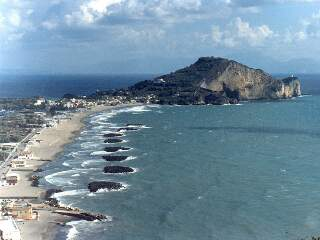
View of modern Capo Miseno, the site of ancient Misenum.

Nearby Cape Miseno marks the northwestern end of the Bay of Naples.

== History ==
According to mythology, Misenum was named after Misenus, a companion of Hector and trumpeter to Aeneas. Misenus is supposed to have drowned near here after a trumpet competition with the sea-god Triton, as recounted in Virgil's Aeneid.

With its gorgeous natural setting and the nearby important Roman cities of Puteoli and Neapolis, Misenum became, from the Republican era, the site of Roman luxury villas, such as that of Marius which was taken by Sulla and later bought by Lucullus. It was then appropriated as imperial property and Tiberius died there in 37 AD.

In 39 BC, Misenum was the site where the short-lived Pact of Misenum was made between Octavian (later Augustus), and his rival Sextus Pompeius.

The first naval base, Portus Julius, nearby at Puteoli, was built during the civil wars in 36 BC by Marcus Agrippa, the right-hand man of the emperor Augustus. It was abandoned and a new base at Misenum developed into the largest Roman port for the Classis Misenensis, the most important fleet. It was a double harbour with two natural basins that exist today. The outer harbour was protected by two breakwaters marked from the south by a double row of pilae in the sea running toward the projection opposite Punta Pennata and from the north by three pilae running south from the Punta Pennata. The inner harbour, the Mare Morto, to the west lies behind a spit of land, and may have been for the reserve fleet and for repair. A channel was cut through the spit to link the harbours.

The town became a municipium in the 1st century.

Pliny the Elder was the praefect in charge of the naval fleet at Misenum in AD 79, at the time of the eruption of Mount Vesuvius, visible to the south across the Bay of Naples. Seeing the beginnings of the eruption, Pliny left for a closer view and to effect a possible rescue, and was killed during the eruptions. The account of his death is given by his nephew Pliny the Younger, who was also resident in Misenum at the time.

== Monuments ==
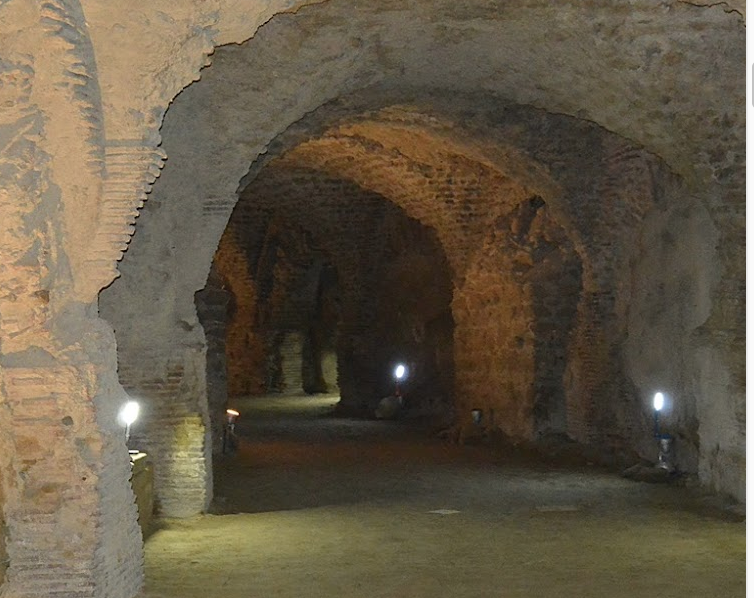
Grotta della Dragonara

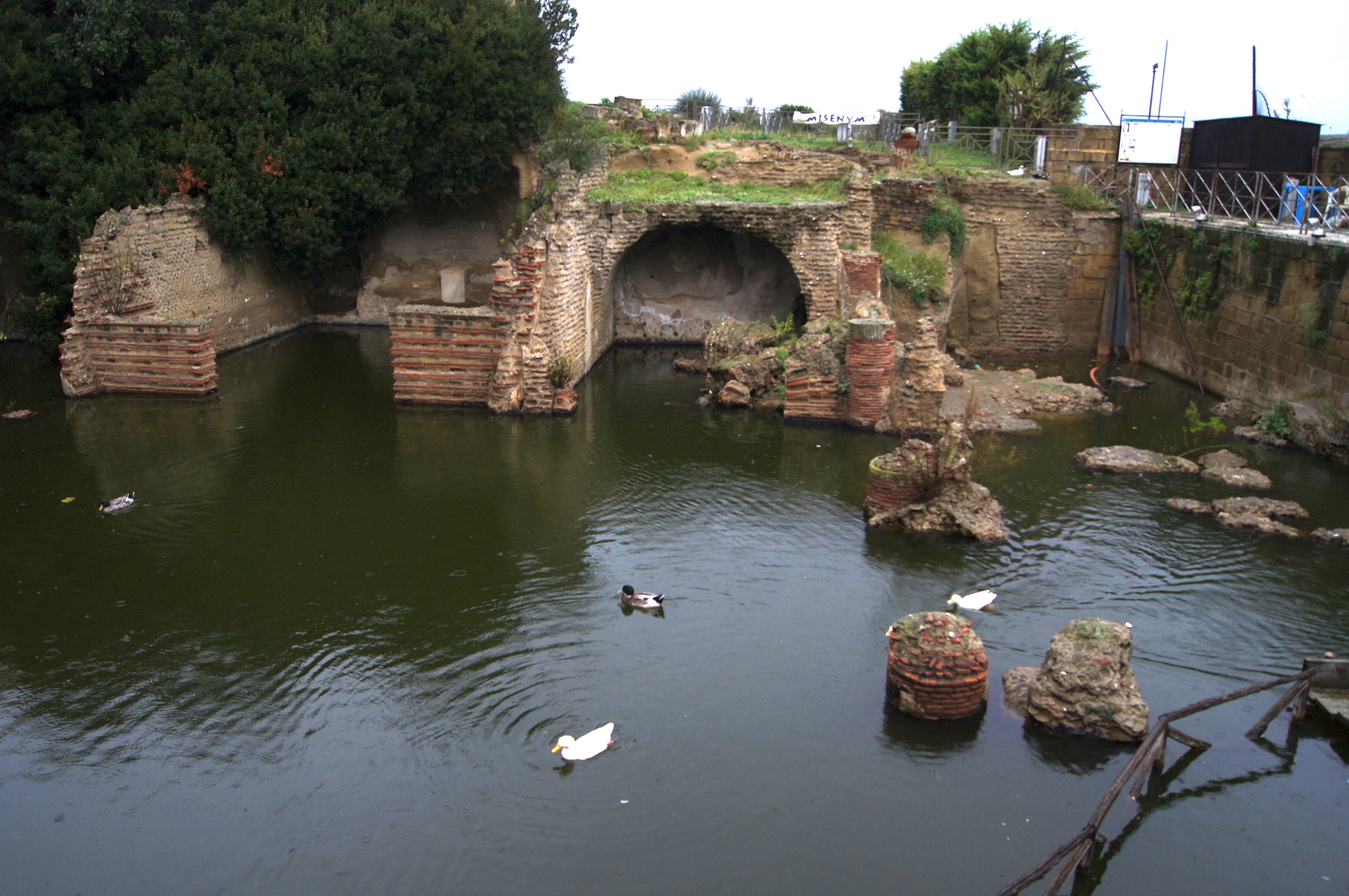
Sacellum of the Augustales

The ancient town including the naval barracks lies below the modern one and hence its layout is poorly understood. Most research has therefore been on the nearby coastal villas which included the fishponds, private harbours and docks in opus caementicium. Nevertheless a rich resource of inscriptions documenting the population has been found particularly in the necropolis.

The Grotta Dragonara is a huge Roman cistern which was dug into the cliff next to the harbour. It may have been used as water supply for the fleet base and/or for the Villa of Lucullus, which was probably on the hill above.

A Roman theatre is located on the coast cut into the tuff cliffs with a semicircular gallery and is half submerged due to bradyseism.

Near the theatre on the coast a large Roman villa complex has recently been discovered which may have been the residence of Pliny the Elder, judging by its date and position giving maximum visibility of the port basin and the Gulf.

=== The sacellum of the Augustales ===
The sacellum of the Augustales is also half submerged due to ground water.

It was discovered in 1968. It was a priestly college whose members were generally recruited among the freedmen in charge of the cult of the emperor Augustus and his successors. The architectural, sculptural and epigraphic finds range in date from the Domitian to the Severan age.

A porticoed courtyard is in front of three rooms in the centre of which is the sacellum, a room with an apse in which an altar is reached by a marble flight of steps. Marble statues of Vespasian and his son Titus were found here, now in the museum. A bronze equestrian statue of Vespasian's other son, Domitian, was also found in the left part of the sacellum, crushed under the collapse of rocks above. It had been transformed into his successor Nerva after the damnatio memoriae (erasure of the records) as shown by a suture along the contour of the face and by three remnants of hair on the back originally depicting Domitian.

A reconstruction of the tetrastyle sacellum with surviving elements of the building is at the museum. It has a façade more than 7 m high, made up of four columns of cipollino marble. It is topped by an elegant marble pediment at the centre of which, supported by two winged Victories, is a crown of oak leaves containing the portraits of the priest Lucius Lecanius Primitivus and his wife Cassia Vittoria and between them the pileus, typical priestly headgear.

== Notable residents ==
In his Second Philipic, Cicero mocked Antony for owning a property at Misenum (bequeathed to Antony by his paternal grandfather), since it was shared with co-owners, having been mortgaged due to Antony's debts.

The powerful and influential Roman empress Agrippina the Younger lived in a palace here, once owned by the orator Hortensius (then by the emperors, and some three centuries later by Symmachus) in which she resided in the months before her death. Misenum is also the place of death of Emperor Tiberius.

Misenum is said to be the birthplace of Saint Sossius, a deacon who was martyred with Proculus of Pozzuoli.

== In fiction ==
Misenum is one of the main settings in Robert Harris' novel Pompeii, whose protagonist, Attilius, works as the aquarius at the Piscina Mirabilis (the reservoir to which the Aqua Augusta aqueduct connected).

In the novel Ben-Hur, Misenum is the location of a villa owned by Quintus Arrius later bequeathed to his adopted son Judah Ben-Hur. The Ben-Hur family would later live in Misenum.
