= Baius =

Baius may refer to:

- Michael Baius, Catholic theologian
- Băiuş, a village in the Leova district, Moldova
- Baius (Ancient Greek: Βαῖος, Baîos), Odysseus's helmsman in Homer's Odyssey, Baiae named after him
