= Baeus (Greek mythology) =

Character from the Odyssey

Baeus or Baius or Baios (Ancient Greek: Βαΐος) was the steersman and a companion of Odysseus. In the mythological epic the Odyssey, he was said to have died during their stay in Sicily.

In the account of Odysseus' wanderings, Lycophron says that Odysseus, journeying alone after the loss of his companions, passed the tomb of Baios, among the places of the western Mediterranean.

He was buried by the bay at Campania, and was said to have given his name to the nearby town of Baiae, as well as to several other islands and towns, such as Mount Baea in the island of Cephalonia.

Twelfth-century Byzantine grammarian John Tzetzes wrote that Baios was buried around Sicily, adding that there were islands and cities along the Aornus in Italy that were named Baiae (Βαΐαι) after him.
