= Baiae =

Ancient Roman town in Campania, Italy

- Baia
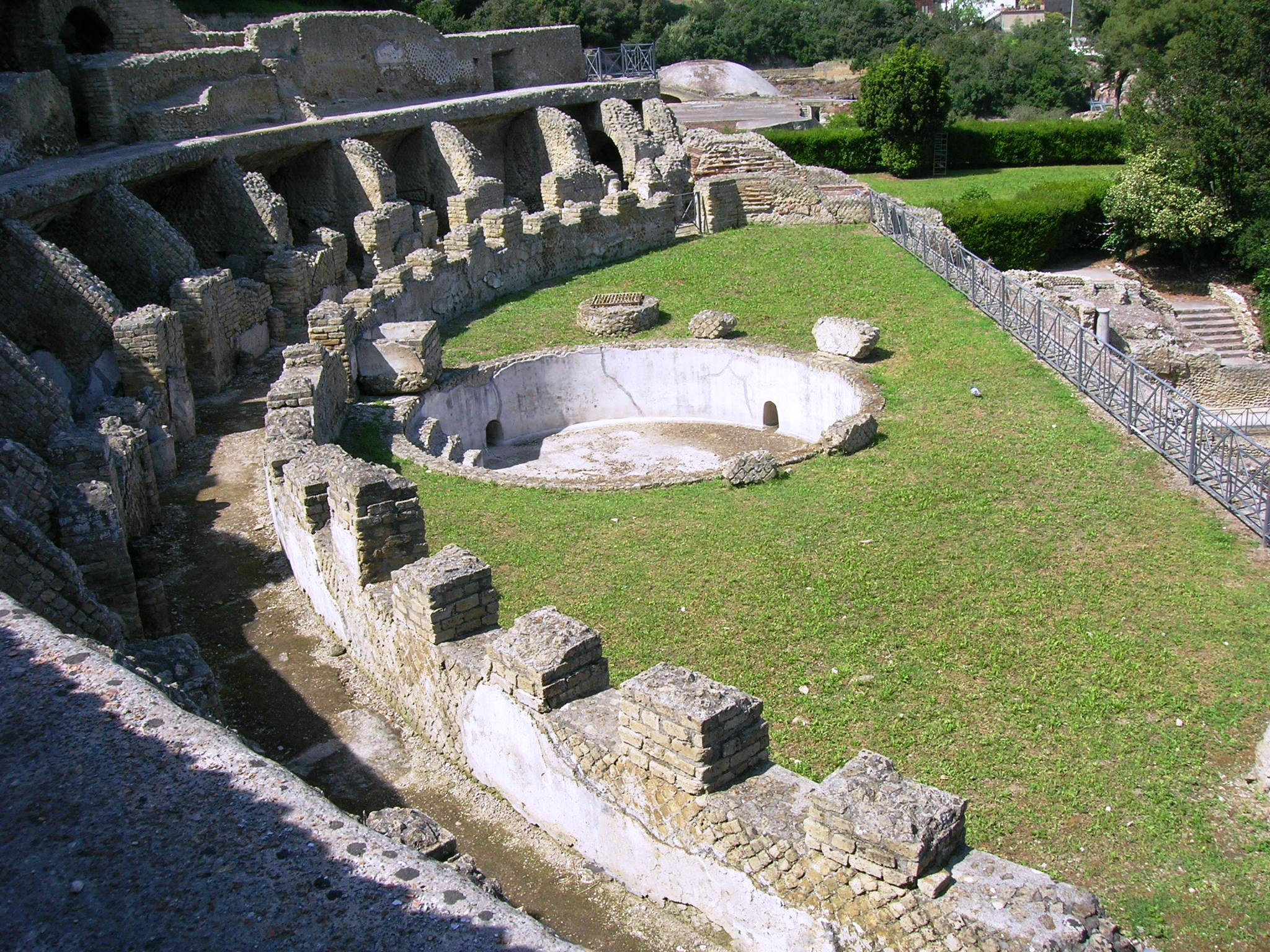
- Thermal baths of the sector of Sosandra

- Location within Campania Location within Italy
- 40°49′00″N 14°04′11″E
- Type: Settlement
- Cultures: Roman
- Location: Bacoli, Campania, Italy
- Region: Italia

Baiae (Italian: Baia; Neapolitan: Baia) is an ancient Roman town situated on the northwest shore of the Gulf of Naples and now in the comune of Bacoli. It was a resort for centuries in antiquity, particularly towards the end of the Roman Republic, when it was reckoned as superior to Capri, Pompeii, and Herculaneum by wealthy Romans, who built villas here from 100 BC. Ancient authors attest that many emperors built in Baia, almost in competition with their predecessors, and they and their courts often stayed there. It was notorious for its hedonistic offerings and the attendant rumours of corruption and scandal.

The lower part of the town later became submerged in the sea due to local volcanic, bradyseismic activity which raised or lowered the land. Recent underwater archaeology has revealed many of the fine buildings now protected in the submerged archaeological park.

Baiae inspired scenes to be depicted on ancient glass flasks made for visitors (probably in Puteoli in the late 3rd to early 4th century AD) many of which have been found scattered throughout the empire, and today kept in many museums notably in Populonia, Empúries and Warsaw.

== Name ==
Baiae was said to have been named after Baius (Ancient Greek: Βαῖος, Baîos), the helmsman of Odysseus's ship in Homer's Odyssey, who was supposedly buried nearby. Baiae is referred to by Silius Italicus as sedes Ithacesia Baii because it was founded by Baius. The adjacent "Baian Gulf" (Latin: Sinus Baianus) was named after the town. It now forms the western part of the Gulf of Pozzuoli.

The settlement was also mentioned in 178 BC under the name Aquae Cumanae ("Cumaean Waters").

== History ==
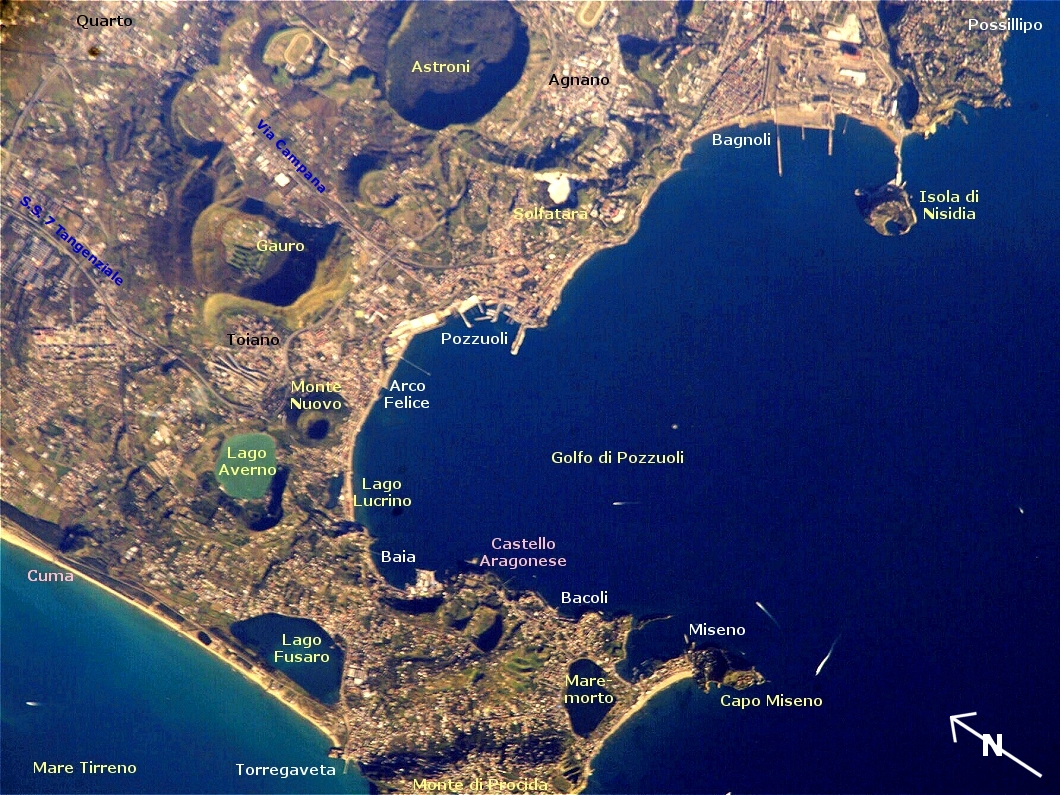
Satellite view of area

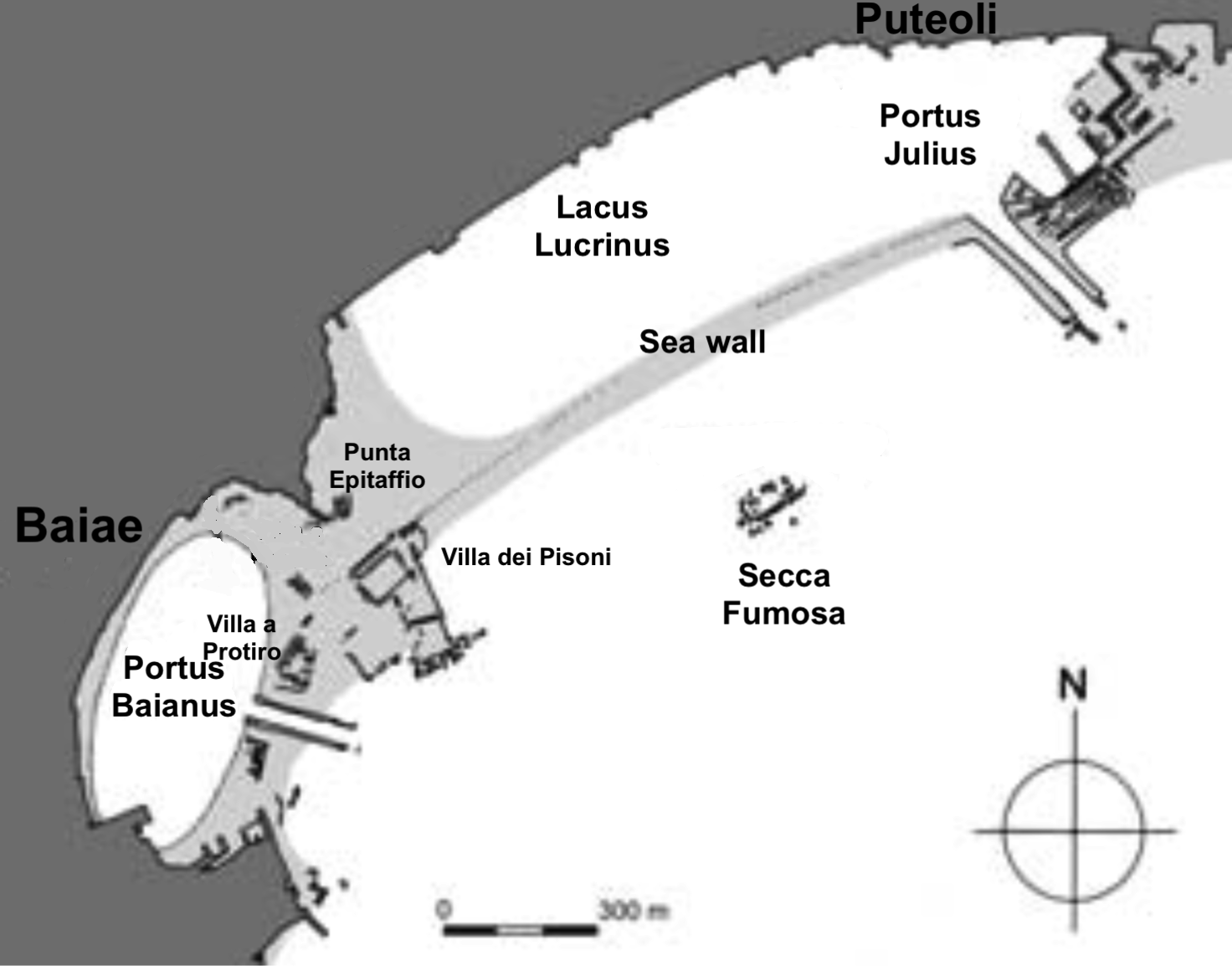
Portus Baianus plan and submerged land (grey)

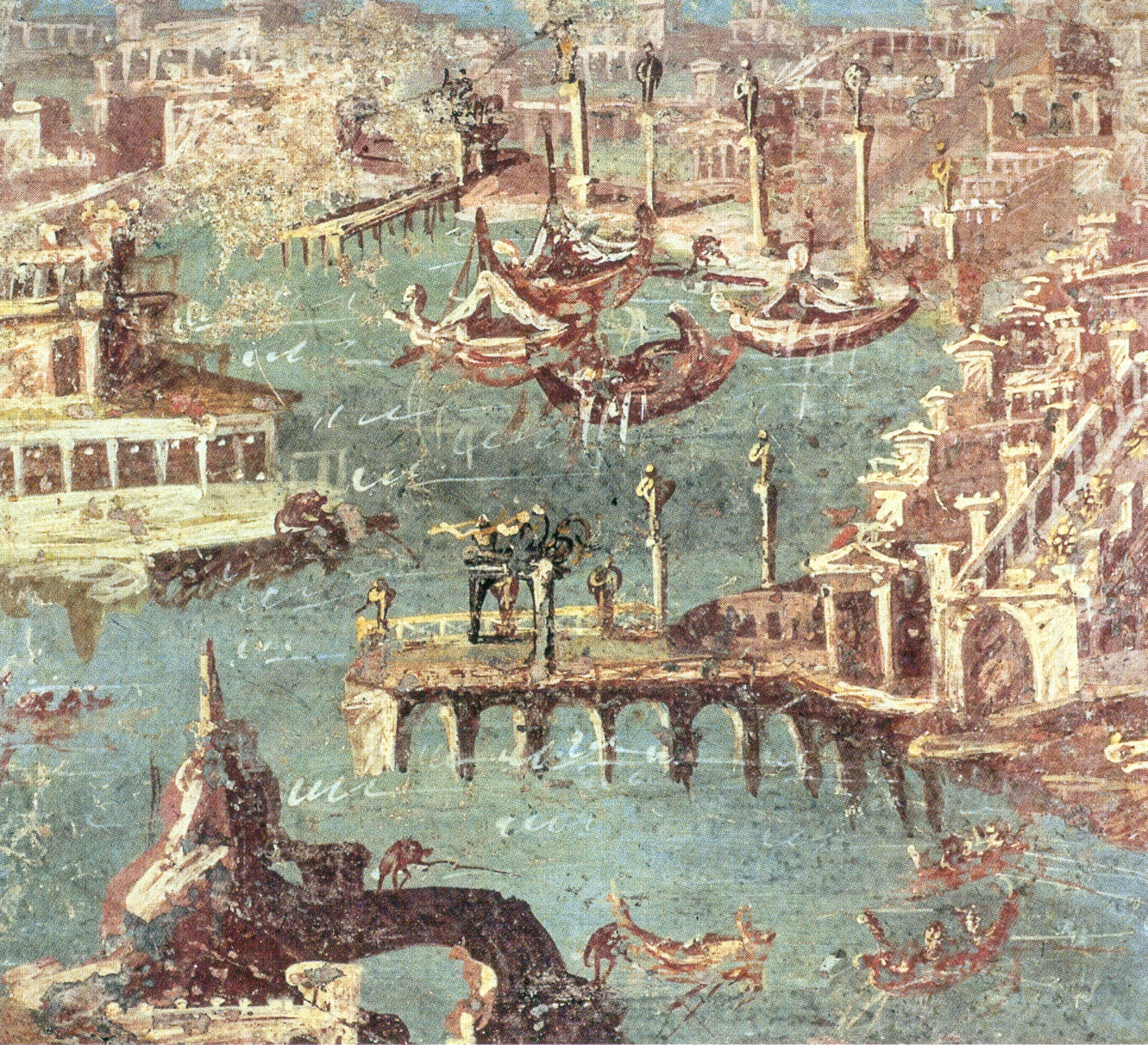
Wall painting from Stabiae, of harbour of Stabiae or Puteoli, 1st century

Baiae was built on the Cumaean Peninsula in the Phlegraean Fields, an active volcanic area, on the side of an ancient crater sloping down to the shore. It was perhaps originally developed as the port for Cumae, the Portus Baianus. It also benefitted from thermal springs for bathing establishments.

Around 80 BC it became a fashionable resort for the Roman aristocracy. Marius, Lucullus, and Pompey all frequented it. Julius Caesar had a villa there, and much of the town became imperial property under Augustus.

From 36 BC, Baiae included Portus Julius, the base of the western fleet of the Roman Navy before it was abandoned because of the silting up of Lake Lucrinus (from which a short channel led to Lake Avernus) for the two harbours at Cape Miseno 4 miles (6.4 km) south.

Baiae was already notorious for the hedonistic lifestyle of its residents and guests in the Republican era. In 56 BC, the prominent socialite Clodia was condemned by the defence at the trial of Marcus Caelius Rufus as living as a harlot in Rome and at the "crowded resort of Baiae", indulging in beach parties and long drinking sessions. An elegy by Sextus Propertius written in the Augustan Age describes it as a "den of licentiousness and vice". In the 1st century, "Baiae and Vice" formed one of the moral epistles written by Seneca the Younger; he described it as a "vortex of luxury" and a "harbour of vice" where girls went to play at being girls, old women as girls and some men as girls according to a first century BC wag.

Nero had a notable villa constructed in the middle of the 1st century and Hadrian died at his villa in AD 138. It was also a favourite spot of the emperor Septimius Severus. The resorts sometimes capitalised on their imperial associations: Suetonius mentions in his history that the cloak, brooch, and gold bulla given to the young Tiberius by Pompey's daughter Pompeia Magna were still on display around AD 120.

According to Suetonius, in AD 39, Baiae was the location for a stunt by the eccentric emperor Caligula to answer the astrologer Thrasyllus's prediction that he had "no more chance of becoming emperor than of riding a horse across the Gulf of Baiae". Caligula ordered a 3-mile-long pontoon bridge to be built from impounded ships of the area, fastened together and weighted with sand, stretching from Baiae to the neighbouring port of Puteoli. Clad in a gold cloak, he then crossed it upon a horse. Cassius Dio's Roman History also includes the event, with the detail that the emperor ordered resting places and lodging rooms with potable water erected at intervals along the bridge. As late as the 18th century, scattered fragments were still being shown to tourists as the "Bridge of Caligula". Malloch has argued that Suetonius's account was likely coloured by his bias against Caligula; instead, he claims that "the act of bridging the Bay of Naples was an excellent and safe means by which to lay the foundation for [Caligula's] military glory."

It never attained municipal status, being administered throughout by nearby Cumae.

At the end of the 4th century, the fabulously wealthy consul Symmachus, who owned several villas in the Bay of Naples, including one called the praetorium in Baiae, wrote of the calm offered by his villa at Bauli (probably Bacoli).

In the early 6th century, the Ostrogothic king Athalaric admired the beauty of the area for its bay, the quality of its oysters and baths of natural waters with health restoring powers.

The lowering of the ground close to the coast below sea level, due to bradyseism, seems to have occurred in two phases: between the third and fifth centuries, still in the late Imperial era, followed by a more substantial submersion a century later. The lower part of Baiae was largely submerged by the sea by the 8th century.

Baiae was sacked during the barbarian invasions and again by Muslim raiders in the 8th century. It was deserted owing to recurrent malaria by 1500, but Pedro de Toledo erected a castle, the Castello di Baia, in the 16th century.

== The Baianus lacus ==
The bay of Baia constitutes the remains of an ancient crater partly submerged in and invaded by the sea. In Roman times it was a complete coastal lagoon, the Baianus lacus, and Roman buildings were located on a sandy expanse between the sea and the eastern bank of the Baianus lacus, now submerged, and occupied the internal slope of the crater.

The channel between the lagoon and the sea made by cutting the sandy isthmus that separated them, and is 32 m wide and delimited by two piers about 230 m long and 9 wide. The piers were made of concrete with tuff chips arranged in layers. The concrete conglomerate was thrown into wooden caissons (arcae) testified by the presence of the typical holes left by the construction piles. In some cases the posts and the planking of the formwork are still perfectly preserved. The north pier is partly preserved in a 63 m length starting from the east.

== Archaeology ==
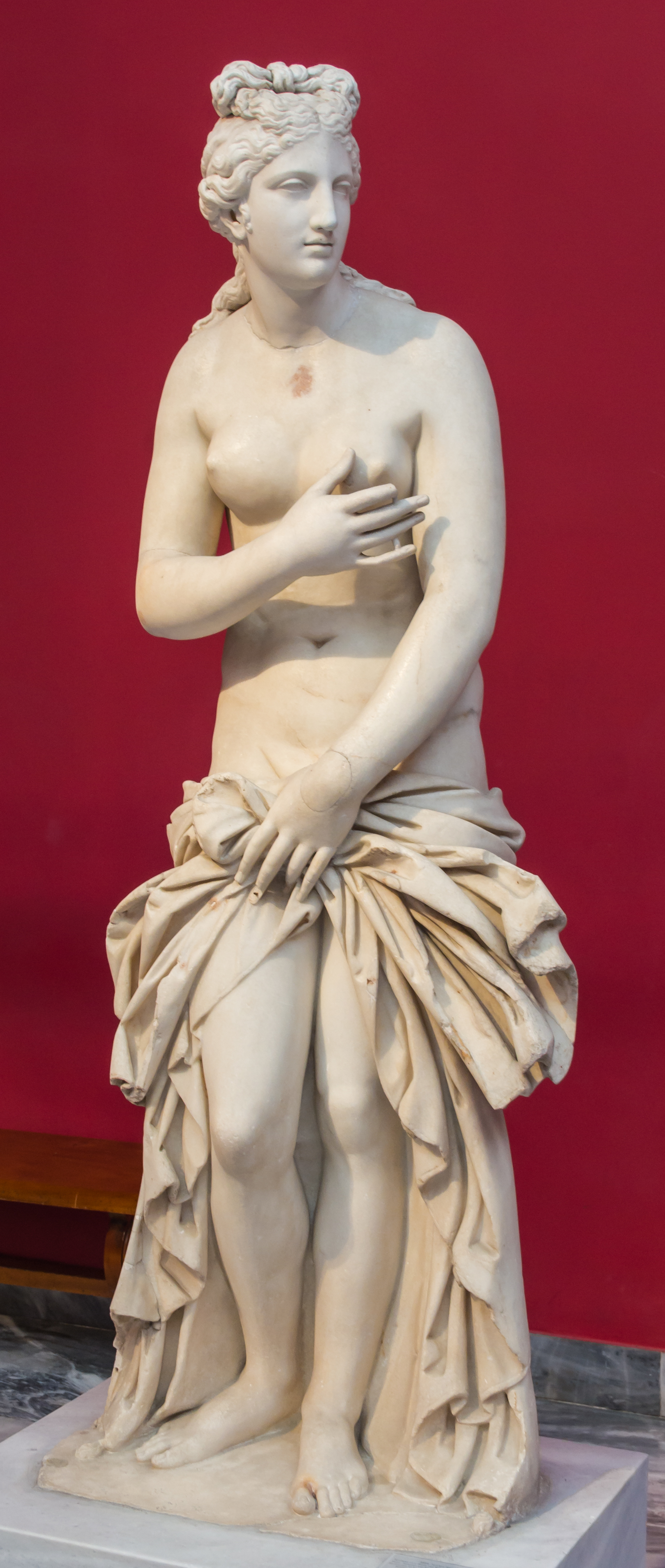
Aphrodite of Baiae. Donated to the National Museum in 1924. The neck, head and right arm were restored by Antonio Canova. Roman version 2nd century AD of the type "Syracuse Aphrodite", 4th century BC. (National Archaeological Museum Athens)

The statue of the "Aphrodite of Baiae", a variant of the Venus de Medici, was supposedly excavated sometime before 1803, when the English antiquary Thomas Hope began displaying it in his gallery on Duchess Street in London.

The important archaeological remains were intensively excavated from 1941, revealing layers of buildings, villas and thermal complexes belonging to periods from the late Republican age, the Augustan, Hadrianic to the late Empire.

A cache of plaster casts of Hellenistic sculptures was discovered in the cellar of the Baths of Sosandra at Baiae; they are now displayed at the town's archaeological museum. The collection includes parts of several famous sculptures, including Athens's Harmodius and Aristogeiton and the Athena of Velletri. It suggests that the area had a workshop mass-producing marble or bronze copies of Greek art for the Italian market.

In April 2023 the sunken remains of an ancient Roman villa including marble tiled flooring, numerous marble columns and an ornate mosaic were discovered by underwater archaeologists from the Campi Flegrei Archaeological Park. The mosaic included crossing braids and hexagons with concave sides.

== Monuments ==
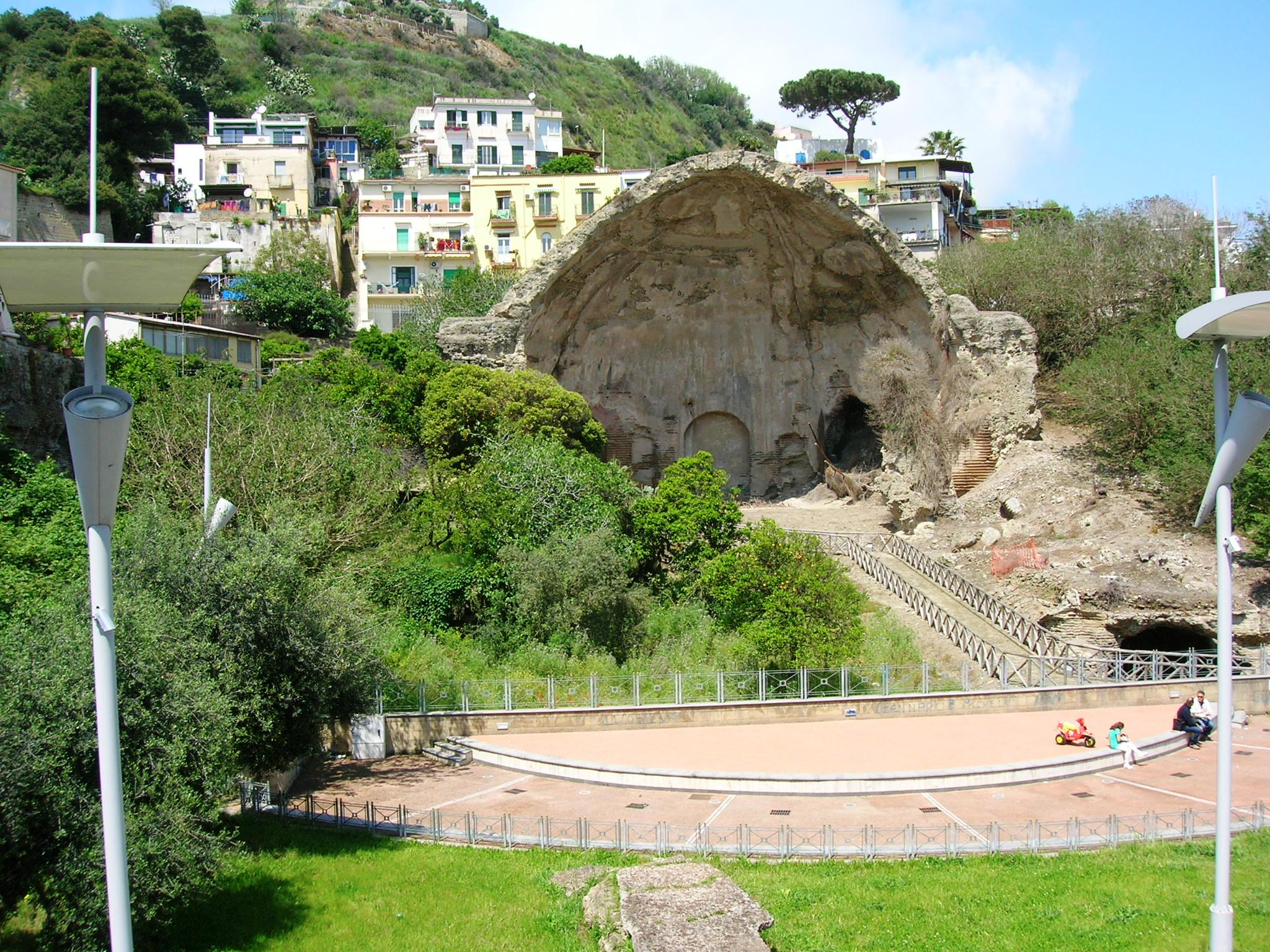
"Temple of Diana"

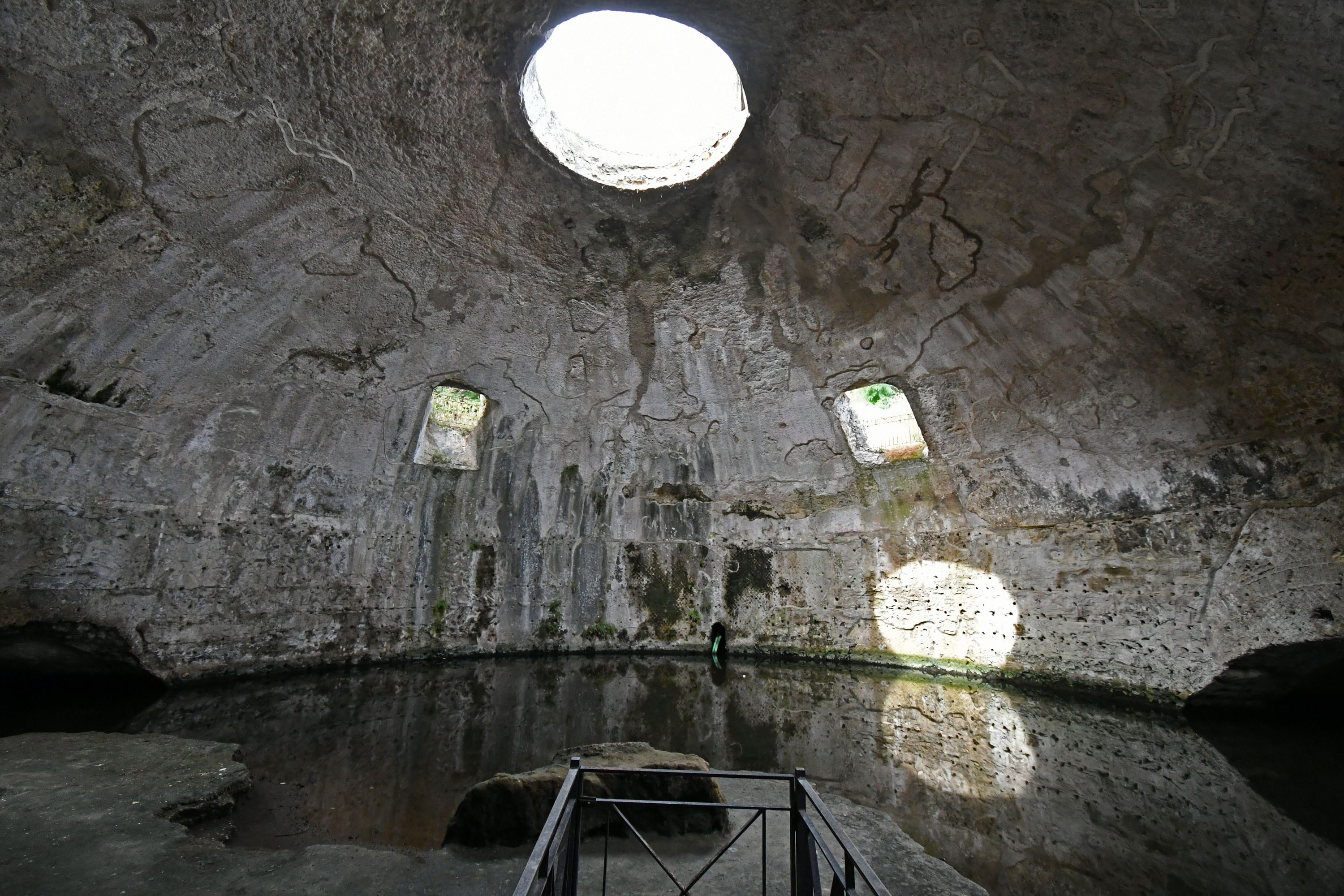
"Temple of Mercury" which has remarkable acoustic properties

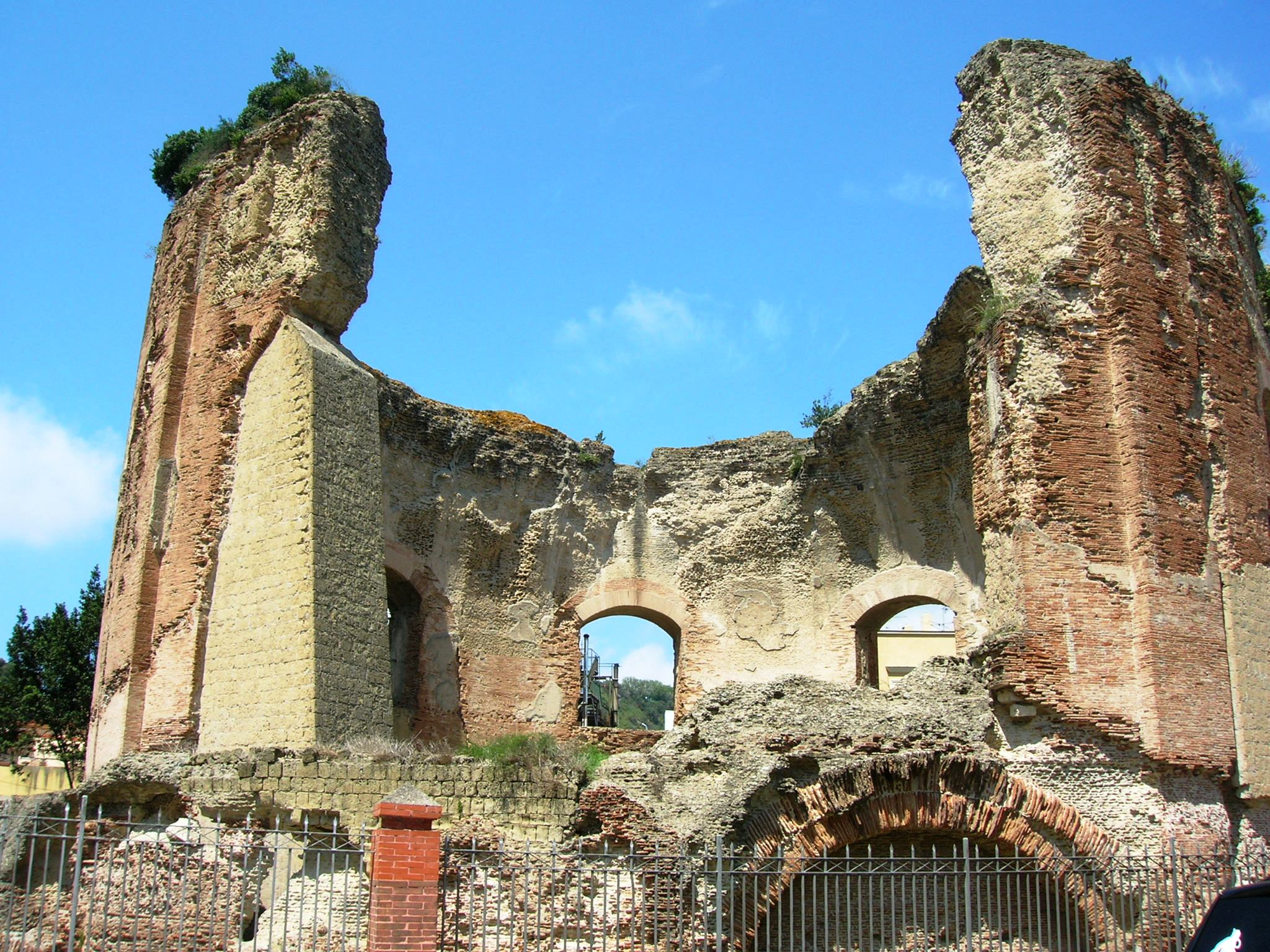
"Temple of Venus"

Among the most significant and remarkable remains are several domed baths buildings such as the great Temple of Mercury, the Temple of Venus, and the Temple of Diana. They were traditionally credited to some of the more famous residents of the town's villas, although they were not temples but parts of thermal baths.

The public and private baths of Baiae were filled with warm mineral water directed to their pools from underground hot springs, as many still are today. Roman engineers were also able to construct a complex system of chambers that channelled underground heat into facilities that acted as saunas. In addition to their recreational function, the baths were used in Roman medicine to treat various illnesses and physicians would attend their patients at the springs.

=== "Temple of Diana" ===
This colossal ogival dome, today half collapsed, originally collected vapours coming from the ground below and was used for thermal baths. It was decorated with marble friezes depicting hunting scenes. It is recognisable as the building erected by Alexander Severus (r. 222–235) in honour of his mother Julia Mamaea, and is perhaps a dynastic heroon.

In 1677 Cornelis de Bruijn visited the temple and wrote:

"Then one arrives at the temple of Diana, which is completely ruined, except for a semi-circular structure at the top that still exists. Opposite, there is also a part of the temple of Apollo, next to which one can see the chamber of the nymphs that delight themselves in different spectacles. At the top of it, I saw many figures and bas-reliefs, very strange and beautiful, as the entrance is still reasonably well preserved."

=== "Temple of Mercury" ===
The "Temple of Mercury" contains a large 21.5 m (71 ft) diameter dome, the largest in the world prior to the construction of Rome's Pantheon in 128 AD. The dome has a central hole or oculus, four square skylights, was made with large tuff blocks, and is the oldest known surviving dome made of concrete. Built in the 1st century BC during the late Roman Republic, it was used to enclose the frigidarium or cold pool of the public baths. From the eighteenth century descriptions it appeared to have had six niches of which four were semicircular.

=== "Temple of Venus" ===
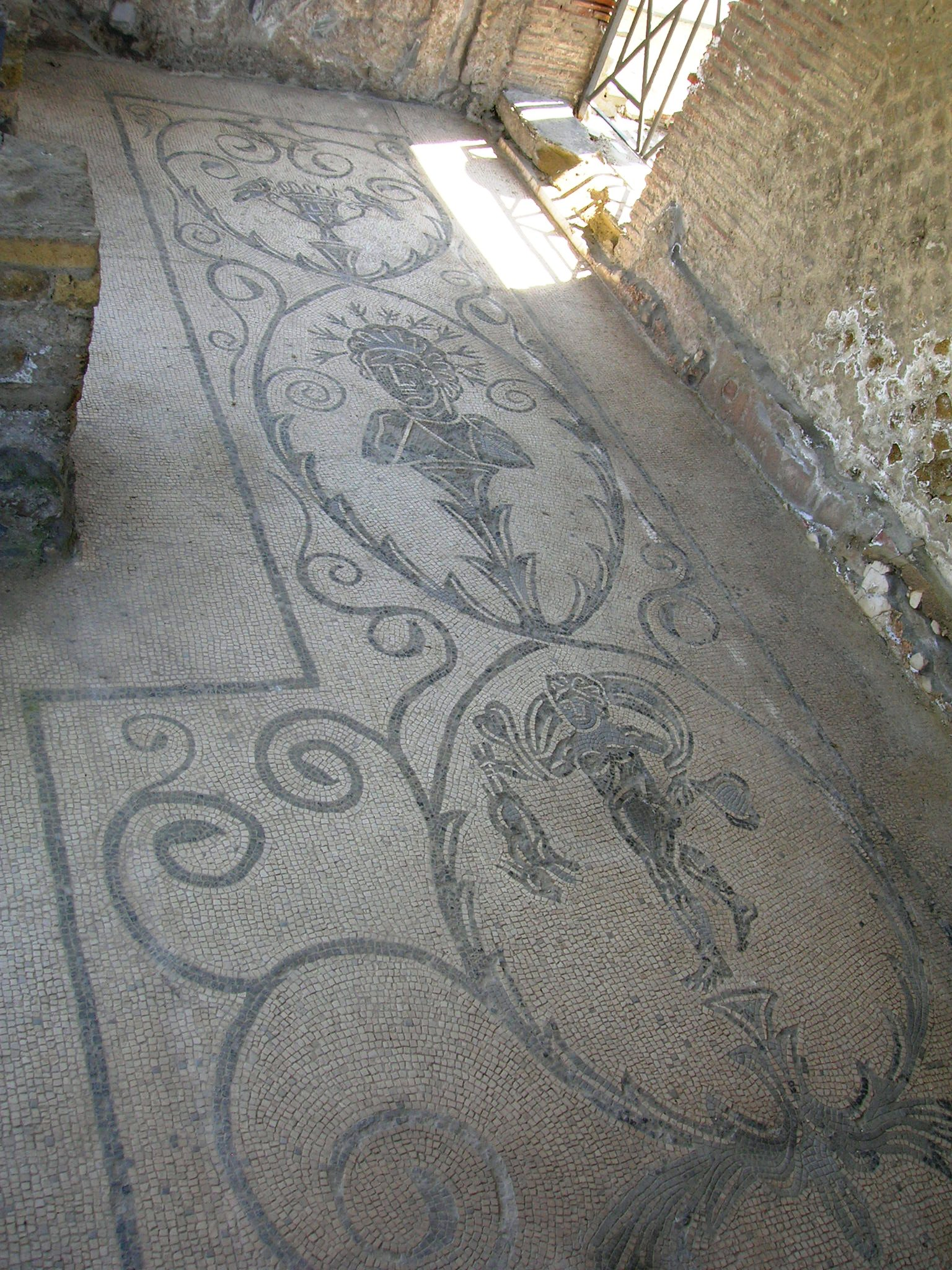
Mosaic in the baths of Venus

This domed building was the most important room of a great baths complex which, together with other buildings on the far side of the coastal road, would have occupied a large part of the town. It was lavishly decorated and was most likely commissioned by Hadrian as indicated by rare architectural features it shared with other monuments of Hadrian especially his Villa at Tivoli. It was externally octagonal with eight large arched windows and internally circular (26 m diameter) with a balcony inside overlooking the pool. Its name is due to a statue of the goddess said to have been found there, leading to mistaken identity.

D'Ossat noted in 1942 that the dome was umbrella-shaped, indeed it was an even more sophisticated variant, composed of sixteen segments alternately spherical and veloidic. There were no such domes before Hadrian, nor anything that remotely resembled them. Indeed domes with the same design as this building can be found in Hadrian's Villa in Tivoli, for example the Vestibule of the Piazza d'Oro (Golden Square) and the so-called Serapeum. The same combination of light tuff and Vesuvian pumice is found in the Pantheon, Rome, re-structured at the behest of Hadrian.

The drum supporting the dome was covered with stucco imitating bands of marble ashlar blocks with joints filled with blue glass paste, so that the top octagon of the drum must have appeared from the outside as made up of parallelograms of shining white marble divided by glittering ribbons of blue.

The perimeter had a forecourt annex of exceptional architectural innovation, with a groundplan of 9 equal circles within a bounding square of 15 m sides and three circular rooms. The groundplan was merged into a different geometrical arrangement in the upper part of this chamber which was of 8 circles arranged around a large circle, topped with an elegant umbrella-shaped cupola. It was made of only curved surfaces, in total about twenty. The distinctive plan of this annex resembles elements of the pavilion of the ‘Piazza d’Oro” of Hadrian's Villa.

The mosaics on the interior of the dome extended down to the window sills, while marble covered the swimming pool and the lower surfaces of the wall.

=== Villa of the Ambulatio ===
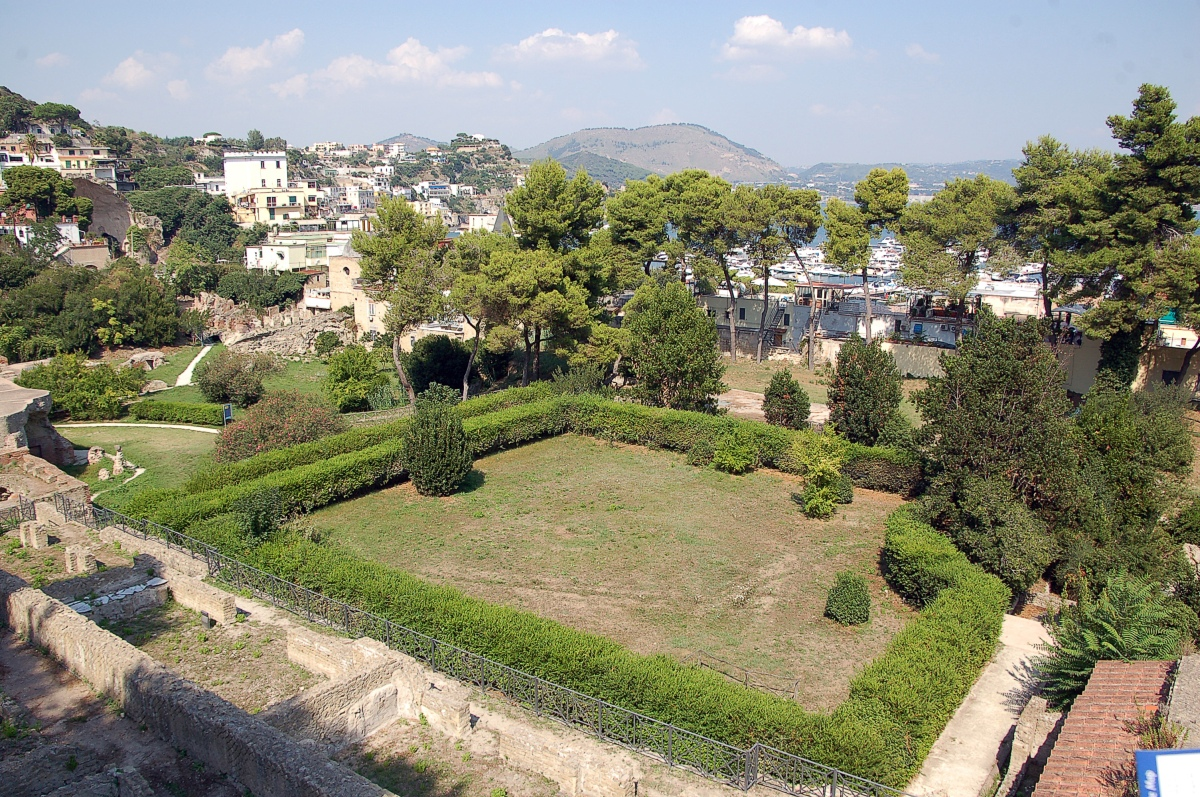
Villa of the Ambulatio

Overlooking the sea is the "Villa of the Ambulatio" with a series of six terraces connected to each other by a complex of staircases of which the last leads to the "sector of Mercury". It is named after the ambulatio, the long corridor with two longitudinal naves on the second terrace, intended to be a covered walk with large openings with a magnificent panorama of the gulf below. Traces of precious stucco can be seen on the brick structure of the central pillars.

On the upper terrace were the residential areas, once richly decorated with several rooms dedicated to leisure. The third terrace is now transformed into a tree-lined garden. The fourth terrace was for service areas. On the fifth terrace are several rooms probably used as places to stay and rest, open to the sea and to the last terrace below that once was occupied by a garden, as today, perhaps surrounded by a colonnade.

=== Sector of Sosandra ===
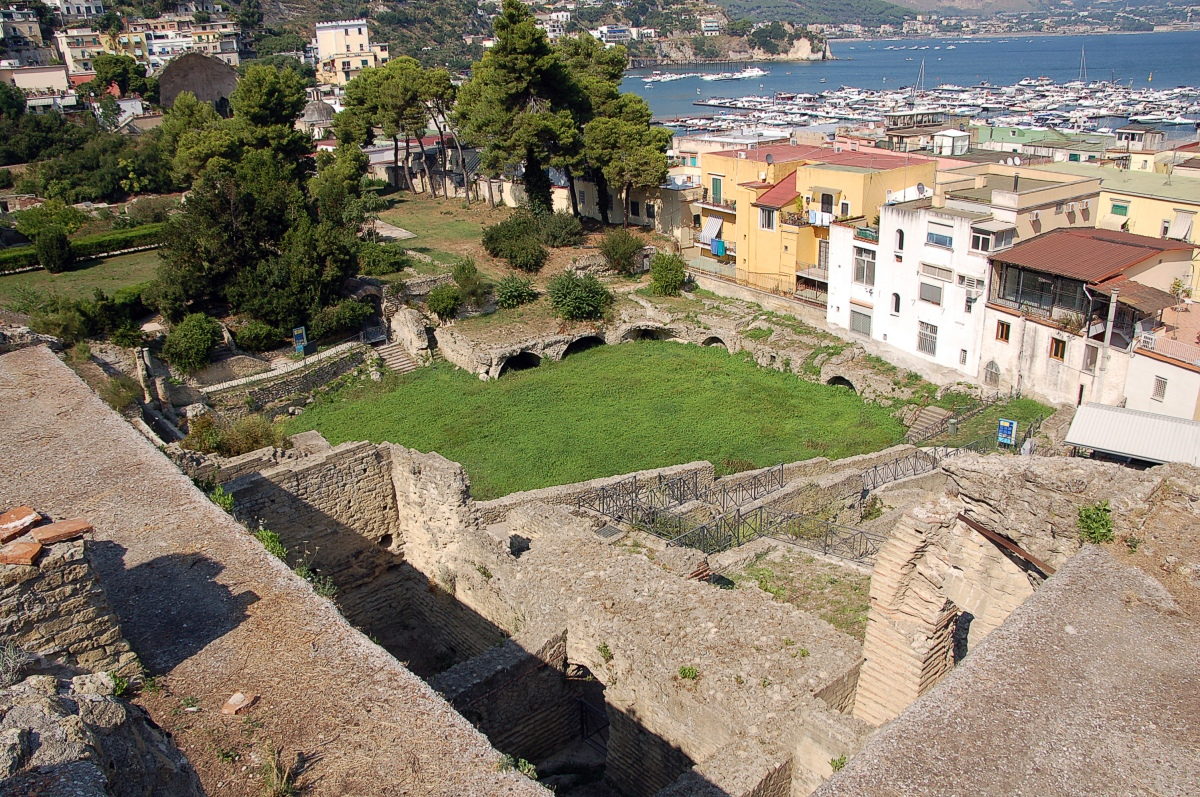
Sector of Sosandra

Bounded by two parallel staircases is the sector or "Temple of Sosandra" from the name of the statue found in 1953 and now in the National Museum of Naples.

The complexity of this sector on four terraces including a spa, a villa, a hospitalia (a sort of hotel for visitors to the nearby spa) is recognisable as the ebeterion built by Nero, according to Dio Cassius, for rest and recreation of the sailors of the nearby Misenum fleet.

On the highest terrace are service areas and a small balneum with rich stucco decorations on the ceiling. The next level has a large terrace bordered on three sides by a portico. In the garden are four parallel walls that perhaps delimited three triclinia in the open. Above the peristyle are several residential rooms, once richly finished, particularly the original precious mosaic floors representing theatrical masks inside geometric frames. Below this level is a semicircular building surmounted by five vaulted rooms once hidden by a façade decorated with niches and columns, overall making an impressive composition. On the axis of the complex is a room perhaps used as a nymphaeum from which flowed the water that fed an existing large external circular tank. On the peristyle of the lower terrace are paintings from two successive periods: those with an Egyptian taste (characters and symbols of the cult of Isis) from the middle of the 1st century AD; these are largely covered by paintings of the 2nd century, which depict male and female figures within architectural schemes.

=== Underwater Archaeological Park ===
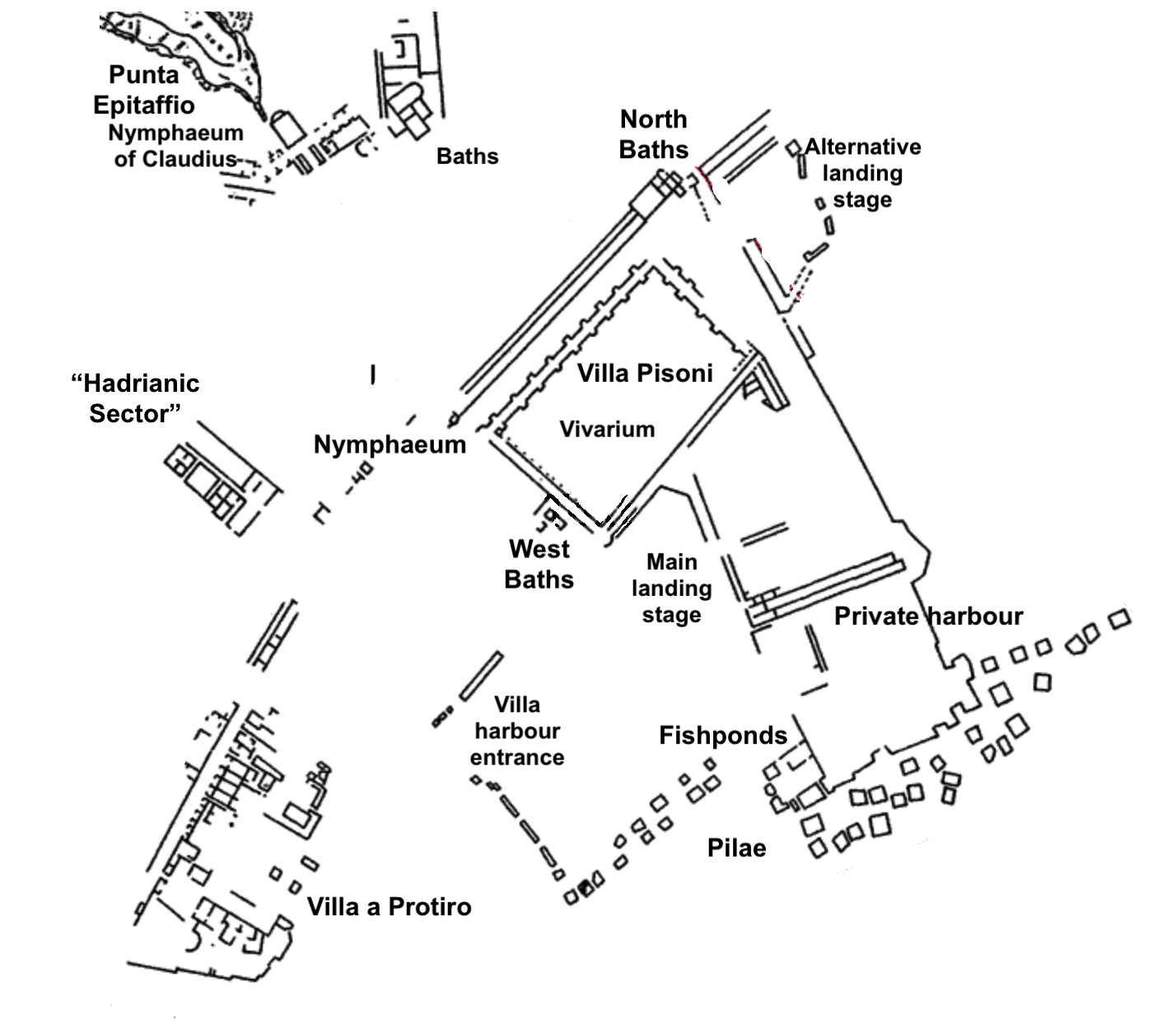
Plan of submerged buildings in the bay of Baiae

In the bay, completely submerged by the waters, are the remains of the commercial ports of Baiae (Lacus Baianus) and the Portus Julius. Further west was the port of Cape Misenum, the base of the Roman imperial fleet. Mosaics, traces of frescoes, sculptures, road layouts and columns are also well-preserved about 5 m below sea level.

The protected areas were established in 2002 as a unique example in the Mediterranean of archaeological and natural protection underwater.

==== The triclinium-nymphaeum of Claudius ====
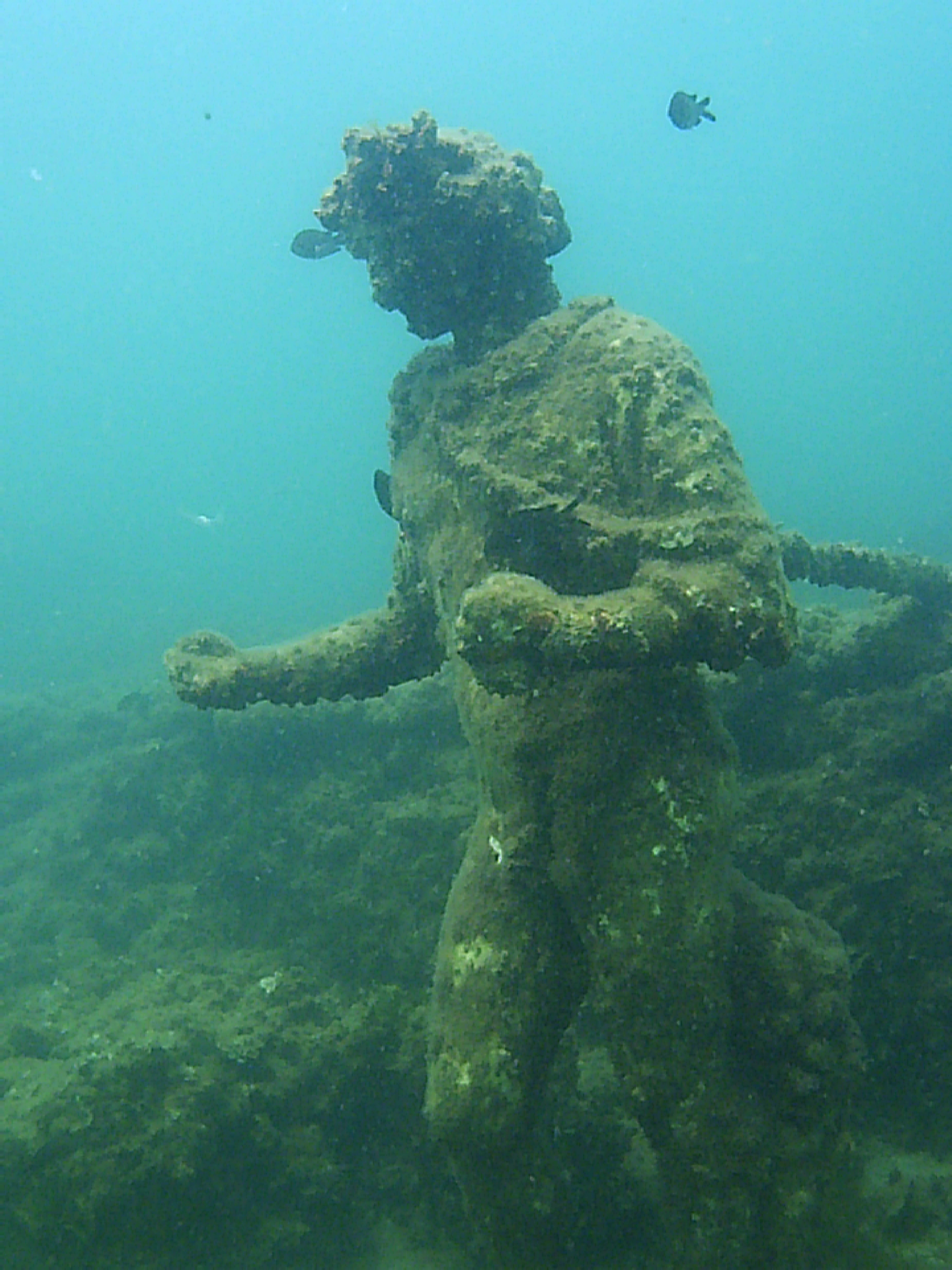
Nymphaeum at Punta Epitaffio, statue of Dionysius

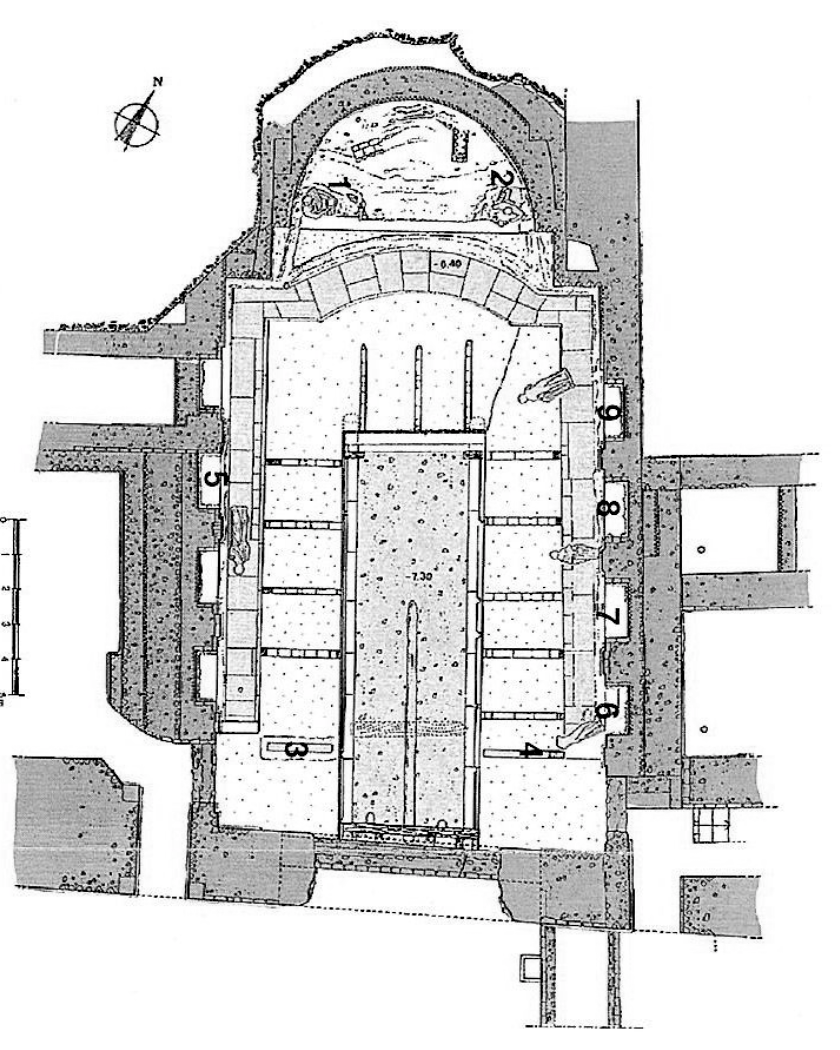
Plan of Triclinium-Nymphaeum of Claudius

In 1969 a remarkable and high quality marble sculptural group was discovered about 7 m deep on the seabed in front of Punta Epitaffio. A systematic excavation was later carried out and found a large rectangular room of about 18 x 10 m with a semicircular apse at one end, entirely covered in marble and with a large pool in the centre. This triclinium-nymphaeum (banquet hall) is identified as a room of Claudius's villa, a complex arranged in terraces from the top of the promontory extending into the sea up to about 400 m offshore. The room is similar to the triclinium-nymphaeum at Tiberius’s villa at Sperlonga intended for luxurious dining and with similar decoration and statues from the Odyssean cycle.

In each of the side walls were four niches housing a statue, while a water channel ran around the perimeter of the room. A horseshoe-shaped marble bed at the end of the pool is a stibadium, a convivial dining couch like the one described by Pliny for his villa; this was placed between the water channel that ran around the walls and the large central basin. Water gushed from some statues placed in the niches on the long sides of the triclinium and from that of Baios (Ulysses' helmsman) in the apse, by means of small lead tubes inserted into the marble.

The decoration was aimed at recreating the atmosphere of a sea cave by the rough natural rocks that covered the apse, the lateral niches and the entrance arch and the water that flowed in the lateral channel and in the central pool. It replicated the episode from the Odyssey in which Ulysses, a prisoner together with his companions in Polyphemus's cave, tries to get the Cyclops drunk and then blinds him. The main statuary group was housed in the apse dominating the hall of which the figure of Ulysses survives, represented in the act of offering Polyphemus the cup of wine, and one of his companions carrying the skin. Cyclops probably occupied the central position.

Of the eight statues in the side niches, four were in an excellent state of conservation: two are in keeping with the intended use of the room as a banquet hall, being figures of the young Dionysus with a clear reference to the Odyssey group in the apse. Of the other two, the first portrays Claudius's mother, Antonia Minor, as Augusta in the guise of Venus Genitrix, with a diadem on her head and a winged child in her arms, perhaps a funerary Eros; the other is a girl with delicate features, with a hairstyle that recalls the youthful portraits of Nero, also adorned with gems on her head. She is possibly one of Claudius' daughters who died in infancy.

At the beginning of the 4th century the palace began to be flooded by the sea due to bradyseism and the majority of wall decorations as well as lead pipes were removed.

The sculptures were transferred to the Museo Archeologico dei Campi Flegrei in the Castle of Baia, while copies were placed in their original position in the submerged site. The museum contains a realistic reconstruction of the nymphaeum.

==== Villa Pisoni ====
South-east of the Punta Epitaffio are the imposing remains of the villa Pisoni from the end of the 1st century BC which initially belonged to the powerful Calpurnia family from which Calpurnia (wife of Caesar), senators, proconsuls, consuls and popes came. It was owned by Lucius Calpurnius Piso shown by lead pipe stamps. The villa was eventually owned by Gaius Piso, the leader of the failed anti-Neronian conspiracy of 65 AD. According to Tacitus, the conspiracy envisaged the elimination of the emperor in this very villa which Nero visited frequently. However, the conspiracy was thwarted, Gaius had to commit suicide and the villa was confiscated to become imperial property.

In the first nucleus of the villa exceptional architectonic solutions were adopted on the ancient promontory in front of Punta Epitaffio with an impressive modification of the original landscape, using artificial piers and quays built directly in the sea, using the astonishing advantages of pozzolana volcanic ash of Campania in the setting of pilae and concrete buildings in submerged or partially submerged conditions.

Hadrian had the villa razed to the ground and rebuilt in an even more grandiose form, experimenting with new compositional solutions. The design of the two apsidal corridors along the courtyard is one of the first significant attestations of a new genre of architecture which in its scenographic results, anticipated the Baroque. The villa shows architectural similarities with Villa Adriana in Tivoli. The facade towards Punta Epitaffio resembled the very rich facades of contemporary theatre buildings.

It was built around a large peristyle courtyard garden (viridarium) of 95 x 65 m, the entire residential complex occupying an area of 120x160 m. The spectacular northern facade probably opened onto a park that separated the villa from the Palace of Claudius and two thermal baths as well as a vast maritime district with piers, docks, fishponds and pleasant lodging pavilions.

Of particular interest is the vast western basin (80 x 110 m) used as a landing place for large boats and protected to the south from the Sirocco winds by a series of double-row pilae.

==== Villa a Protiro ====
The villa was next to the entrance channel to the Baianus lacus and stretched for about 120 m along the street front lined by a row of shops. It consists of two main parts, thermal baths and a residential section with garden, separated by a rectangular basin linked to the sea and decorated with statues, one of which (of the Aphrodite of the Gardens type) was recently recovered.

The name is derived from a prothyrum entrance or vestibule, a space between the interior fauces of a villa leading to the atrium and the street. In this case it had two stuccoed columns that edged two short parting walls built on the sides of the threshold with doorways to the ostiarius quarters (gatekeeper's lodge).

The villa has a large variety of architectural types and is especially remarkable for the wide variety of marble flooring and wall coverings in most of the rooms. The atrium walls were clad in marble. To the south of the atrium opens a vast apsidal hall (the apse at the back is 10.4 m wide), probably an addition to the first building and similar to the late imperial halls of the rich domus of Ostia Antica which also have rich covering of large marble slabs. The walls of the adjacent rooms were decorated with marble and many had mosaic flooring.

=== Other sites ===
Baiae was supplied with water from a branch of the Aqua Augusta aqueduct, a cross-section of which can be seen nearby.

A mosaic floor, which belongs to a Roman villa, was discovered here in 2024.

== Cultural depictions ==
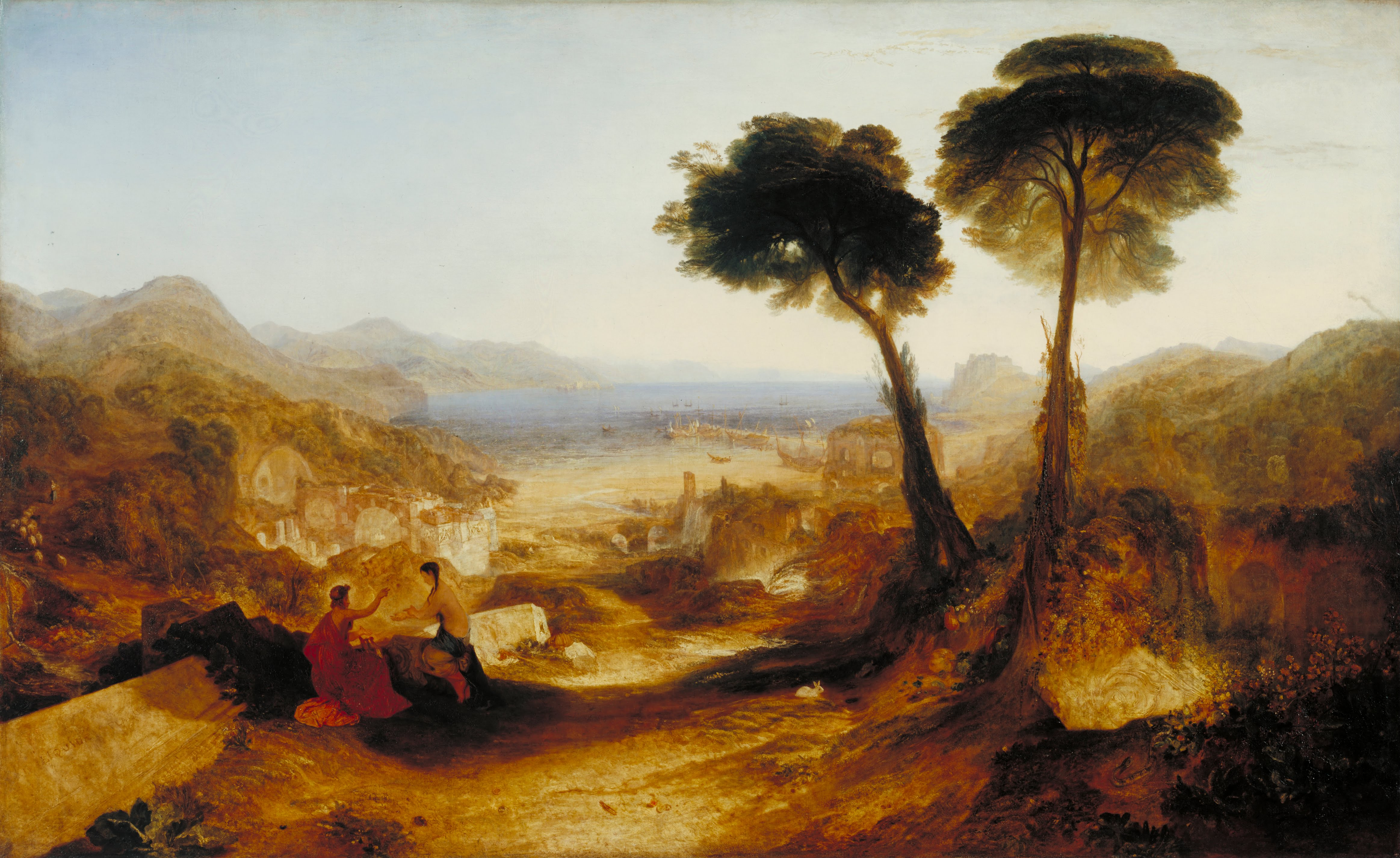
The Bay of Baiae by Joseph Mallord William Turner, 1823

- Seneca the Younger, the Roman Stoic philosopher, makes reference to this city in one of his Epistulae Morales ad Lucilium.
- Giovanni Gioviano Pontano (d. 1503) wrote his Two Books of Hendecasyllables on the pleasures of Baiae.
- The lost wonders of Baiae were a common feature of Romantic poetry. It appears in John Keats's "Ode to May" and in the third stanza of Shelley's "Ode to the West Wind". The vanished columns of the ancient town inundated by the sea is the central conceit of Konstantin Batyushkov's 1819 "You awake, oh Bayya, from the tomb..." (Ты пробуждаешься, о Байя, из гробницы...), "one of his last and finest poems".
- The "princely" seaside resort of the empire appears in J. Meade Falkner's 1895 novel The Lost Stradivarius and Anatole France's 1902 "Procurator of Judea" (Le Procurateur de Judée). In current fiction, it is the setting of Caroline Lawrence's Sirens of Surrentum; John Maddox Roberts's Under the Shadow of Vesuvius; Steven Saylor's 1992 Arms of Nemesis, set during the Spartacus Rebellion; and Marguerite Yourcenar's Memoirs of Hadrian.
- In the Ecce Romani series of Latin textbooks, Baiae is the location of the character Gaius Cornelius Calvus's summer villa.
- Baiae was featured in the PBS show Secrets of the Dead in the March 2017 episode "Nero's Sunken City".
- Baiae was featured on Channel 4 programme Rome's Sunken Secrets, which aired on in the UK on 16 April 2017.
- A forgotten Baiae tunnel complex features prominently in the UK series called Forbidden History, whereby the presenter visits a supposed grotto of the Cumaean Sibyl.

== See also ==
- Fusaro Lake
- List of Roman cisterns
- List of Roman domes
