= Tourism in ancient Rome =

Tourism in ancient Rome was limited to the Roman upper class due to its expense and long travel times. Common destinations for ancient Roman tourists were Greece, Egypt, and the coast of Campania. Roman tourists sought out sites in Greece of cultural and historical importance, such as the numerous Greco-Roman temples and the athletic games such as the Olympics. In the Imperial era, Egypt was one of the most popular destinations for Roman tourists; they were enticed by their perception of Egypt as exotic and foreign. Roman travelers toured Egypt to observe sites such as the Pyramids and to visit cities such as Alexandria or Luxor. Wealthy Romans would spend the hottest parts of the year in villas outside of the city of Rome or in resort towns such as Baiae. During the same summertime months, non-Romans would travel to Rome to see the many monuments and structures throughout the city.

During the Roman Empire, tourists were motivated by the Roman concept of otium, or leisure time. The Romans believed that such time should be spent engaging in intellectual, artistic, or philosophical pursuits. Roman tourism was sometimes motivated by educational pursuits; these tourists sought out famed rhetoricians or teachers at their destinations. Tourists would also travel to other areas in hopes of seeing sites of historical or religious importance, such as the ruins of Troy or temples throughout the Greco-Roman world. Religious tourists sometimes hoped to attain the services of a certain god, such as medical help at a temple of Asclepius or advice from an oracle. After the rise of Christianity, Christian tourists began to embark on religious pilgrimages to sites considered holy.

== Methods of travel ==
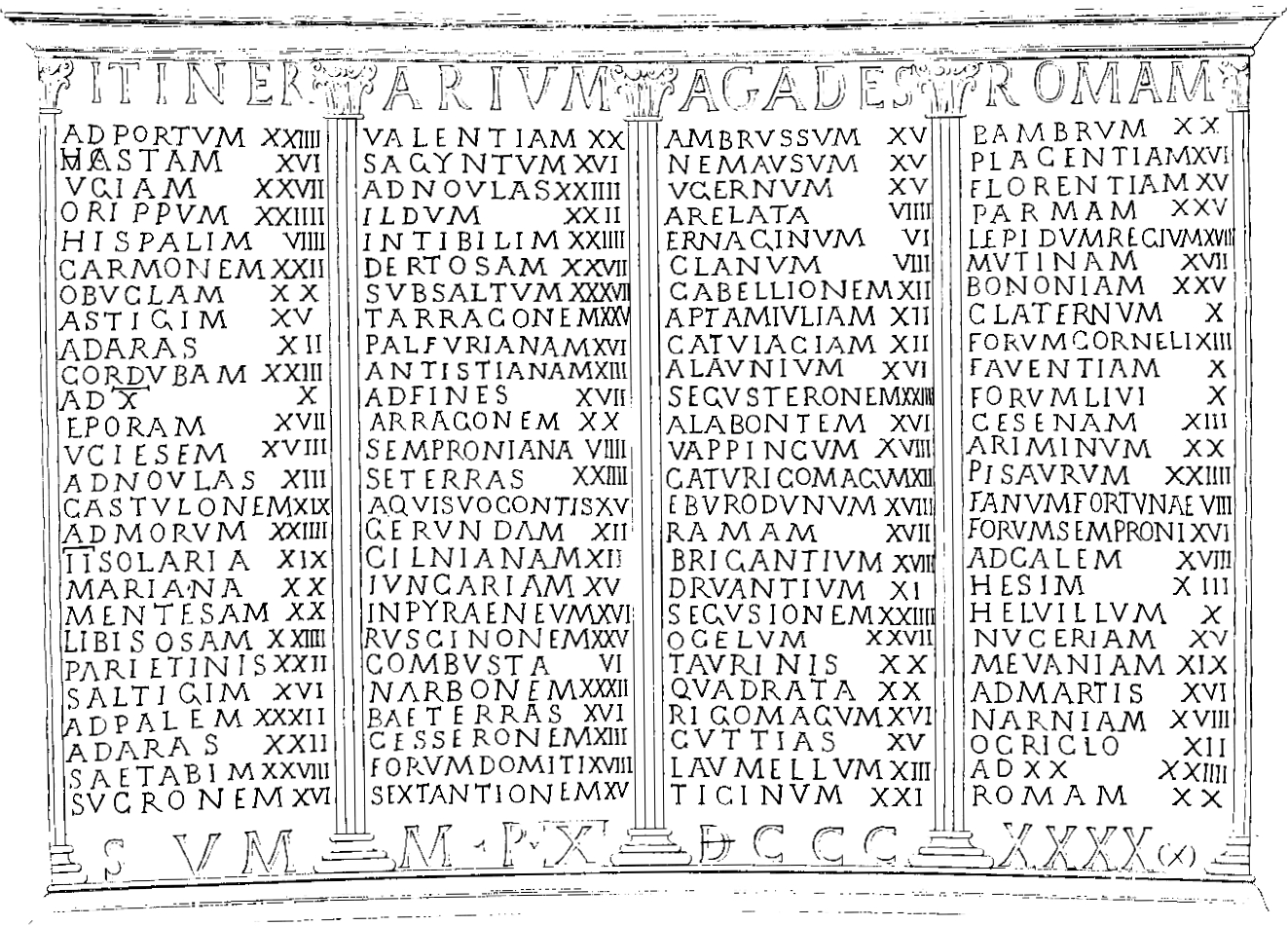
Ancient Roman itinerarium, or travel guide, from the 1st-century CE Vicarello Cups

Long-distance travel was difficult to access for poorer Romans due to limited time and economic constraints. Shipwrecks, storms, poor maps, and weather conditions also presented challenges for tourists. Usage of the Roman roads was limited by the poorer quality of roads more distant from cities and towns. Roads were primarily intended for the transportation of military forces rather than for tourism.

Piracy may have also been a concern for travelers in antiquity. The status of piracy in the Roman world is difficult to discern. The existence of ancient inscriptions referencing pirates indicates that there was at least a small presence of piracy in the Mediterranean. However, piracy was likely not as widespread as Republican-era authors claimed. Roman authors frequently laud different military or political leaders, such as Pompey, for their supposed eradication of piracy. However, these claims are certainly ideological in nature; they likely served as propaganda pieces intended to justify and promote Roman leadership and governance. In De Imperio Cn. Pompei, Cicero cites the supposed elimination of piracy by general Pompey to glorify his leadership capabilities, providing justification for the Lex Manilia, which granted Pompey military command over the Third Mithridatic War:

For during these last years, what place in any part of the sea had so strong a garrison as to be safe from him? What place was so much hidden as to escape his notice? Whoever put to sea without being aware that he was committing himself to the hazard of death or slavery, either from storms or from the sea being crowded with pirates?

Most ancient authors during the Principate claimed that piracy was suppressed by the emperors. The Res Gestae, a posthumous inscription for Augustus completed around 14 CE, claims that piracy had been eliminated during his reign. Although piracy was likely reduced during the Principate, the continued maintenance of large and expensive fleets implies that piracy remained a threat, albeit a minor one. Roman tourism peaked in the 2nd century CE due to the easier travel conditions brought by the Pax Romana.

Travelers were aided by the hospitality traditions of the Greco-Roman world. The Romans viewed hospitality, which they termed hospitium, as a moral obligation. Guidebooks and tour guides provided additional assistance to ancient Roman tourists. According to Plutarch, a 1st century CE Greek biographer, the tour guides were notoriously loquacious. Plutarch, in a collection of works called the Moralia, wrote that "the guides went through their standard speech, paying no attention whatsoever to our entreaties to cut the talk short and leave out most of the explanations on the inscriptions and epitaphs." Nonius, a Roman grammarian, quoted a satirical prayer invoking protection from these guides originally authored by the 1st century BCE Roman polymath Varro: "Zeus, protect me from your guides at Olympia, and you, Athena, from yours at Athens." Ancient Greek tour guides typically regaled tourists with myths and stories about the various attractions. In the Amores, a set of two dialogues discussing the nature of love, Pseudo-Lucian comedically describes an incident at the Sanctuary of Dionysus where numerous opportunists beset one of the characters, offering to explain the stories behind the various sites for a price. Pausanias, a keen tourist in 2nd century CE Greece, wrote, "even the guides of the Argives themselves are aware that their account is not entirely correct." Pliny the Elder, a 1st century CE Roman naturalist, wrote satirically of a Roman politician named Gaius Licinius Mucianus, who Pliny viewed as a gullible tourist willing to believe these stories.

== Attractions ==
=== Anatolia and Greece ===
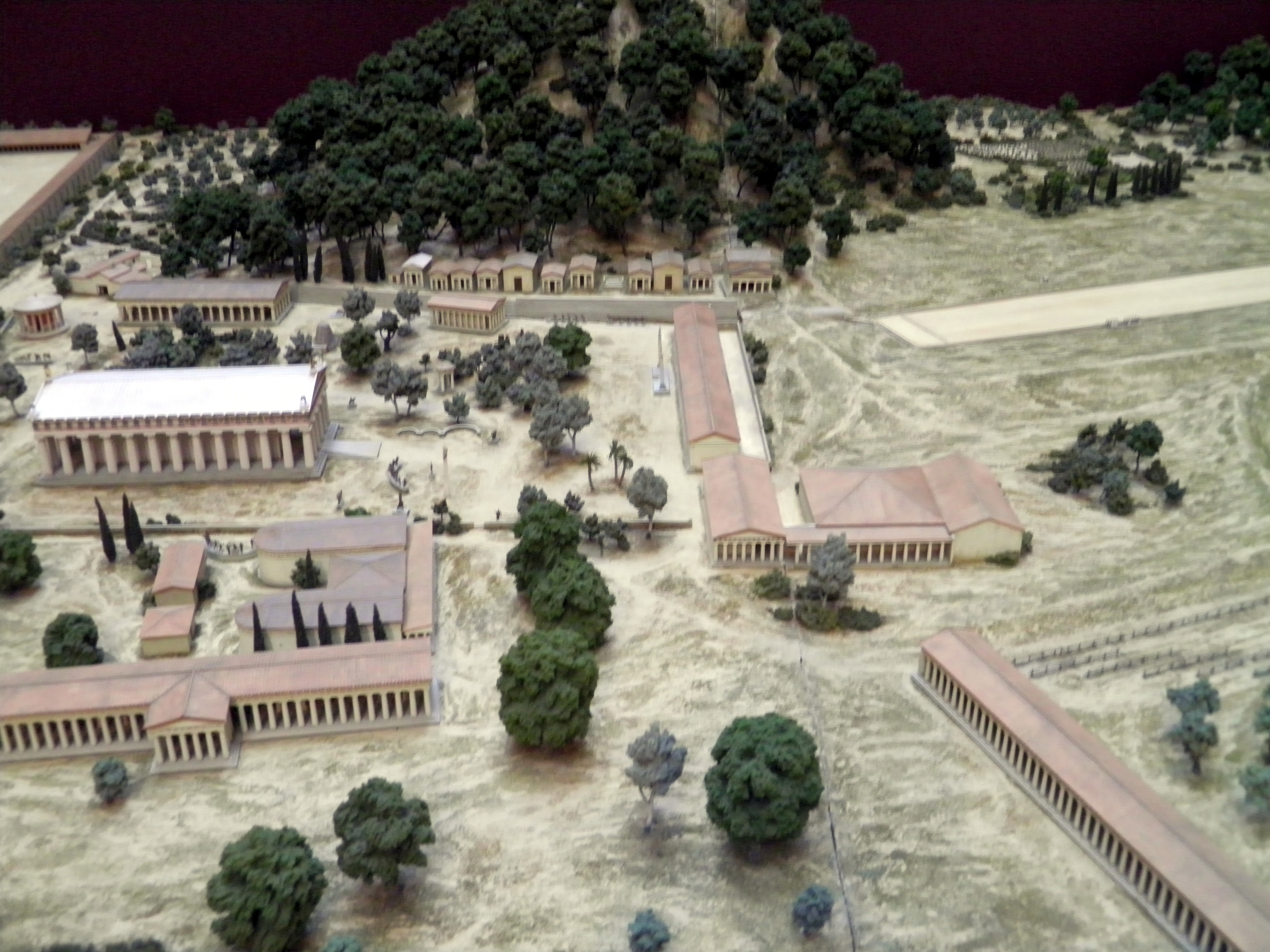
Model of Olympia, the home city of the ancient Olympic games

It was common for ancient Romans to travel to the islands of Lesbos, Samos, Rhodes, Chios, and the islands of Ionia. Greek cities in Asia Minor and renowned cities such as Athens or Sparta were also popular tourist destinations. Sparta became a hub of tourist activity during their yearly festival in honor of Artemis Orthia. During this festival, male adolescents known as epheboi were whipped at the altar. Commentators such as Plutarch or Cicero, a 1st century BCE Roman politician, possibly viewed this ceremony as strange and morbid. The ancient Romans were drawn to attractions such as the Colossus of Rhodes, the Statue of Zeus at Olympia, and the Satyr of Protogenes. The ruins of Troy held symbolic significance for the ancient Romans due to the Roman myth that their civilization descended from the Trojans. Julius Caesar visited the site and toured the area with a guide. Afterwards, he erected an altar to his legendary Trojan ancestors. The gens Julia, the family of Julius Caesar, claimed descent from a mythical founder called Iulus, who they identified with Ascanius. In Roman legend, Ascanius was the son of Aeneas, a mythical Trojan hero. Germanicus worshipped at a Trojan site believed to be the tomb of Hector, Hadrian restored the site thought to be the tomb of Ajax, and Caracalla sacrificed at the area commonly thought to be the tomb of Achilles.

Roman tourists frequently traveled to Greece to witness the Olympic Games, the Pythian Games, the Isthmian Games, and the Nemean Games, as well as to visit Greek temples. Greco-Roman temples were enticing attractions partially due to their religious significance. Greek temples functioned as the home of their respective deities through the cult statues depicting the gods. However, access to these sites was restricted according to local customs and the specific rules of each temple. Pausanias journeyed across Greece with the explicit motivation of visiting cult sites. Similarly, Cicero describes a visit to a cult statue depicting Heracles. Temples were also analogous to modern museums; they could contain and display large collections of artifacts for sightseers. However, these temples did not collect as diverse an assortment of artifacts as modern museums; they focused on preserving the history of the local deities and communities. Various areas throughout Greece claimed to house the tombs of mythical characters. The city of Megara claimed that it held the remains of Iphigenia; Pylos claimed that it held Nestor's remains. In some cases, multiple cities claimed to contain the remains of the same legendary figure; Argos and Cyprus both claimed to house the remains of Ariadne.

Temples often profited greatly from tourism; visitors were typically required to pay entrance fees—usually in food, money, or objects—to access the temples. These fees served as a source of revenue for temples. Temples of Asclepius, the Greek god of medicine, were often visited by individuals seeking miraculous cures for their ailments. People visited Greece to consult oracles, particularly oracles of Apollo in Delphi, Delos, or Claros. The oracles of Heracles, the oracle of Trophonius near Lebadea, and the Temple of Fortuna at Praeneste were other oracles in high demand. Another type of oracle, called "oracles of the dead," were located in caves and were believed to allow one to contact the dead.

Tourism in Greece assumed heightened importance during the Second Sophistic period, a historical term referring to Greek authors from the 1st to 3rd centuries. Dio Chrysostom, a Greek orator, claimed that Sophistic philosophers attracted tourists to Greece; some allegedly came to the Isthmian games to glimpse Diogenes Laertius. Second Sophistic writers emphasized classical Greek culture; their ideals possibly motivated the focus on pre-Roman sites found in the Descriptions of Greece of Pausanias. Pausanias, who authored a guidebook for travelers in Greece, refrained from discussing the Roman impact on the sites he describes. This focus possibly derives from anti-Roman sentiments, Pausanias may have been influenced by his own personal tastes; he possibly focused on describing sites that he personally viewed as worthwhile. Another potential influence of Pausanias may have been a desire to record Greek monuments, many of which were decaying.

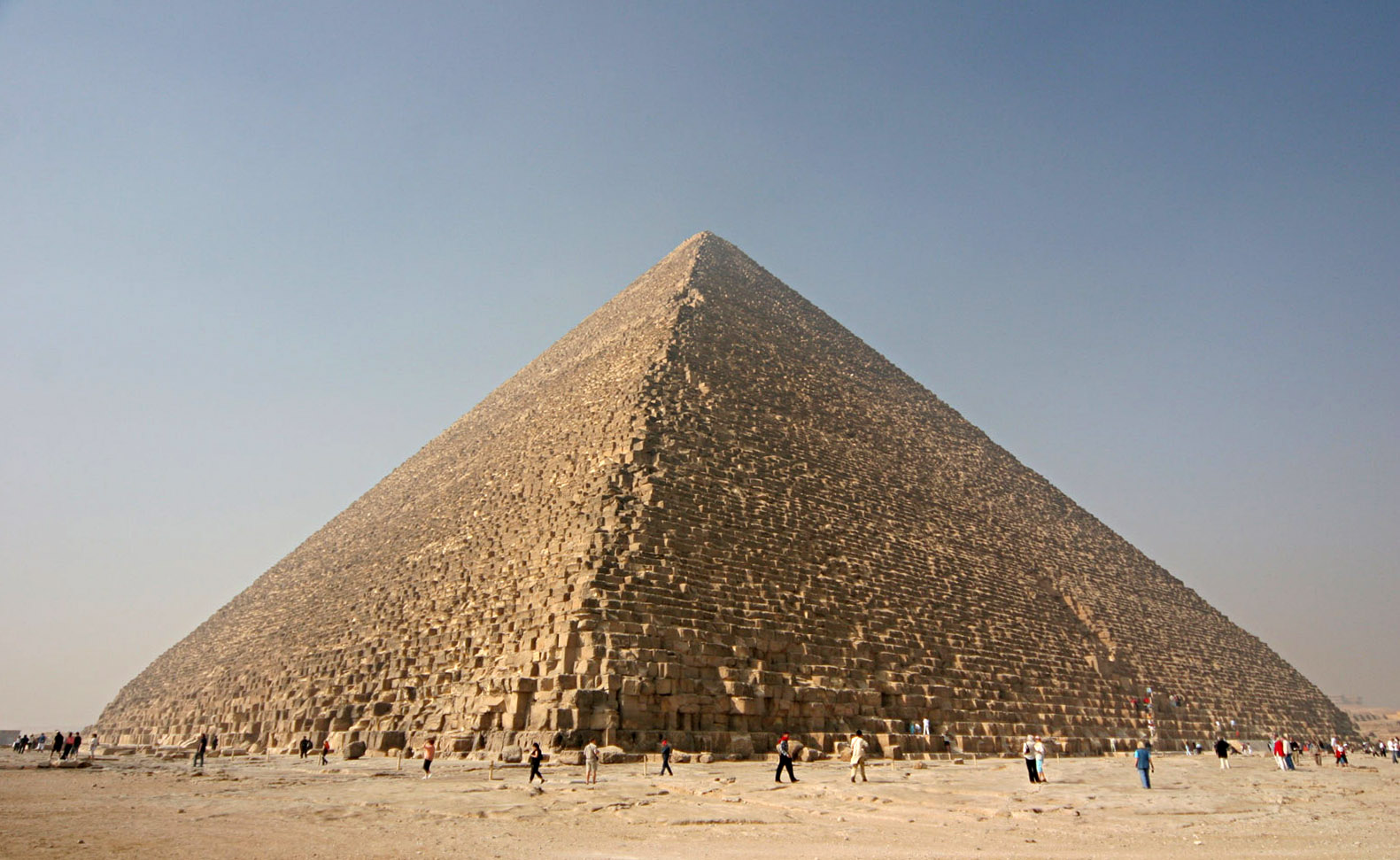
The Egyptian pyramids were popular tourist attractions for the ancient Romans

=== Egypt ===
Egypt was another popular destination for ancient Roman tourists. Roman writers often portrayed Egypt as exotic, mysterious, and ancient. Diodorus Siculus, a Greek historian who visited Egypt around 60 BCE, claimed that it was intriguing due to its unique traditions which were foreign and strange to the Greeks:

"The customs of Egypt, both those which are especially strange and those which can be of most value to our readers. For many of the customs obtained in ancient days among the Egyptians have not only been accepted by the present inhabitants but have aroused no little admiration among the Greeks; and for that reason those men who have won the greatest repute in intellectual things have been eager to visit Egypt in order to acquaint themselves with its laws and institutions."

Strabo, a 1st century BCE Roman geographer, describes a possible example of an ancient Egyptian tourist trap at Syene. Strabo writes that local boatmen would sail upstream past the first cataract of the Nile into the rapids to entertain tourists. The ancient Romans misconstrued two statues in Thebes, likely of Amenhotep II, as depicting the Greek mythological king Memnon. These statues were famed throughout the ancient world for their supposed ability to talk. Consequently, they became a popular tourist attraction. Strabo recounts visiting the statues and hearing noises; however, he remained skeptical about whether the sounds were produced by the statues or nearby people. The statues were covered with graffiti left by Roman-era tourists. Some graffiti merely announced that the inscriber had heard the voice of Memnon or arrived at the site; others were long epigraphs written by professional poets venerating the supposedly miraculous capacities of the statue. It was common for these inscriptions to announce the time they heard the voice of the statue. For Roman tourists, it was considered lucky to hear the noises of the statue during dawn or to hear the audio multiple times within a visit. Julia Balbilla, a Roman poet and a friend of the emperor Hadrian, wrote four poems in Homeric style detailing her encounter with statue. The first poem describes Hadrian's visit to the statue. In the second poem, she prays for the statue to communicate with Vibia Sabina, the emperor's wife. This prayer was unsuccessful; in the following poem, she claims that the statue refused to speak "so that the beautiful Sabina might come back here again." However, Balbilla recorded that the statue spoke to Vibia during her second visit. Alexandria and the Pyramids were the most popular sites in Egypt. Alexandria's most popular attractions included the Serapeum, the Musaeum, and the Pharos. Sightseers would also visit the Apis bull in Memphis, and the cities of Thebes and Luxor. Egyptian temples such as the Temple of Ptah in Memphis were open to outside visitors. Tourists would have been allowed to partake in the local rituals.

=== Italy ===
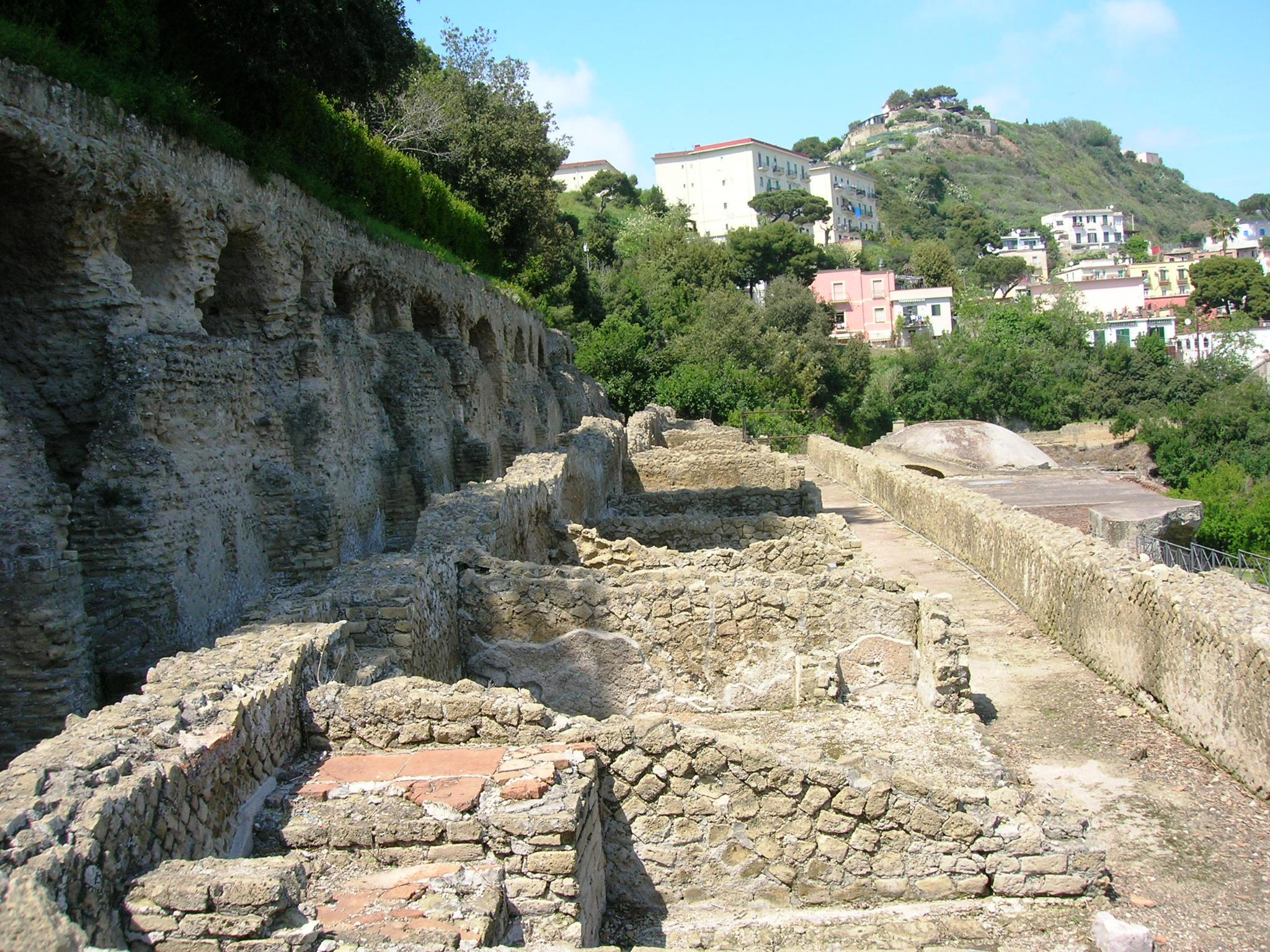
Ancient Roman villa in Baiae

During summertime, the oppressive heat compelled many Romans to leave the city. Wealthy Romans would purchase vacation villas outside of the city of Rome, where they would spend the hottest months of the year. They could also be located on the coast of Campania in the Tyrrhenian Sea. Non-Roman tourists frequently visited Rome during summertime. They would tour the baths, chariot racing, gladiatorial games, shop at the various markets throughout the city, and watch chariot-racing in the Circus Maximus or gladiatorial games in the Colosseum. Stadia throughout the Roman world became popular attractions for sports tourists. Visitors often traveled to the base of the Palatine hill, where a fig tree supposedly marked the location where the cradle of Romulus and Remus was overturned.

Roman tourists frequently vacated to resorts across the shoreline from Rome to Naples. Baiae was an ancient Roman town located near modern Bacoli on the Gulf of Naples. It was a popular resort in ancient Rome, primarily during the end of the Roman Republic. The town was known for corruption, scandals, and hedonism. According to Varro, bars dotted the area, and upper-class women were said to pretend to be prostitutes. Varro wrote that in Baiae men acted like boys, and boys acted like girls. It was common to visit the areas by Herculaneum and Pompeii in the Gulf of Naples. Other popular tourist destinations included areas by the Bay of Sorrento, Cumae, and Cape Misenum. Horace, a 1st century BCE Roman poet, described how the luxury villas in these areas were packed so tightly that "the fish were feeling cramped." For ancient Roman villa owners, traversing the shore in litters and riding on oar-propelled boats were common activities.

Countryside tourism was also popular in ancient Rome. Roman people frequently visited the Alban and Sabine hills east of Rome. Numerous lavish country estates were built in the Roman countryside. Such villas often functioned as homes and resorts; these villas were self-sufficient, containing farms, large storages of food or wine, and often other amenities such as bakeries. Many villas lacked these same luxuries and exclusively served as resort homes. Tourism in the Alps was not popular; people viewed the mountains more as obstructions rather than as attractions. However, Mount Etna was a popular attraction due to its religious significance and the view of the sunrise from the summit. There was an inn at the top of the mountain for visitors.

== Motives ==
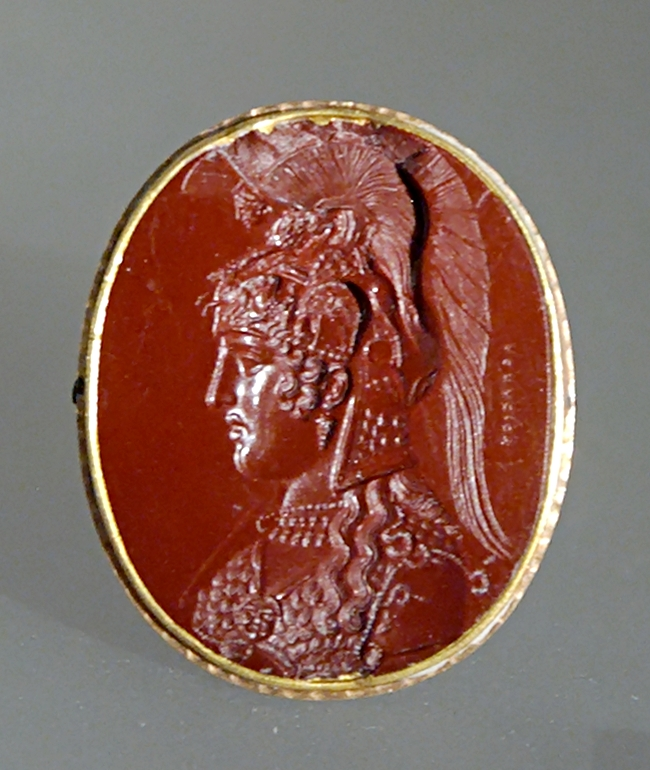
1st-century CE engraving of Athena Parthenos by the philosopher Aspasius

During the reign of Augustus tourism and leisure assumed a more prominent role in Roman culture. It is unclear if people ventured on "Grand Tours" in which they traveled across the Mediterranean to see various notable tourist attractions such as Athens or Delphi. If such a tour existed, it would likely have been too expensive and time-consuming for common folk to embark on. Many tourists returned home with memorabilia from their destination. It was common for ancient Roman tourists to draw sketches of themselves near famous attractions or to commission such drawings. In Athens, tourists could collect paintings, pottery, terracotta, artifacts, silver statuettes, glass bottles, and miniature figures depicting the Statue of Athena by Phidias. According to Pseudo-Lucian, tourists could acquire sexually explicit pottery as a souvenir. In the New Testament Book of Acts, the creation of which is typically dated to around 80–90 CE, the 1st-century CE Christian apostle Saint Paul is described as encountering an Athenian silversmith who produced and sold silver temples of Diana. Travelers often engraved evidence of their journey in graffiti. In Egypt, an inscription was found reading "I, Lysa, slave of Publius Annius Plocannus, came here in Year 35 of Caesar." Another Egyptian inscription reads "I, Gaius Numidius Eros, was here in Year 28 of Caesar, returning from India, in the month Phamenoth."

Roman tourism during the Imperial era was heavily influenced by the concept of otium, a term referring to leisure time. The Romans believed otium should be dedicated to artistically, physically, or academically beneficial activities. Tourism was often motivated by the desire to fulfill this concept. Wealthy and upper-class Romans may have traveled to areas throughout Greece or Asia Minor for educational or philosophical pursuits. Greece, Massalia, and Alexandria were common destinations for tourists who intended to further their education. Many of these tourists sought high-quality teachers and rhetoricians in the areas they visited.

Educational motivations included the desire to see sights of historic or cultural significance. Pliny described this phenomenon amongst Roman tourists: "There are a number of things in this city of ours and its environs which we have not even heard of, much less seen; yet, if they were in Greece or Egypt or Asia, we would have heard all about them, read all about them, looked over all there was to see." Prior to the Hellenistic period, ancient Greek writers typically associated the concept of curiosity with excessive interest in irrelevant or useless things. However, following the Hellenistic period, the concept of curiosity was identified with the Greek notion of philomatheia (φιλομάθεια), meaning “love of learning.” Stoic and Epicurean philosophers maintained divisive perspectives on travelers who were motivated by curiosity. Although these perspectives were not unanimous amongst either philosophy, Epicurean philosophers tended to view leisure tourism more negatively than the Stoics did. Epicureans often believed that travel was dangerous and could threaten their ataraxia (ἀταραξία), or state of contentment. Stoic philosophers adopted a more positive light on travel and curiosity: they believed exploration benefited the knowledge of the tourist. Seneca the Younger, a 1st century CE Roman philosopher, commented upon Roman tourism in his essay De Otio. He claimed that tourists hoped for excitement in their travels; they wished to escape the mundanity of ordinary life. Seneca spoke highly of the desire for exploration and new knowledge or experiences. However, he chastised tourists who lacked deeper philosophical pursuits in their travels.

Roman pilgrims traveled across the empire in search of religiously important sites. One inscription from the Temple of Mandulis in Talmis references a man named Sansnos who traveled to sites throughout the empire with the hope of worshipping each god. Although the tradition of religious tourism continued following the rise of Christianity, Christian pilgrims had distinct motivations from earlier Roman religious tourists. Pagan pilgrims lacked the same desires for atonement, penance, or salvation which often motivate Christian pilgrimage. Early Christians may have even sparked the construction of ecclesiastical structures in the Holy Land. Contemporary Christian writers portray Christian pilgrims as motivated by piety. St Jerome, a 4th century Christian author, described a Roman noblewoman named Paula zealously traveling from holy site to holy site: “Moreover, in visiting the holy places so great was the passion and the enthusiasm she exhibited for each, that she could never have torn herself away from one had she not been eager to visit the rest.” Cultural attitudes surrounding tourism changed with the rise of Christianity. Tertullian, a 2nd-century Christian author, argued that the pursuit of knowledge should serve the purpose of understanding or glorifying God. Similarly, Augustine—a 4th-century Christian theologian—cautioned against the desire of knowledge for knowledge's sake; warning that it could lead to the neglect of spiritual matters. These newer perspectives on tourism and travel are reflected in the descriptions of Paula. St Jerome emphasizes the religious motivations for her travel, rather than any personal desires. Egeria, a Roman woman who authored an account of a pilgrimage, also emphasizes the spiritual motivations of her journey; possibly due to an attempt to avoid appearing vain or pleasure-seeking.

Medical tourism was popular in the ancient Roman world; temples of Asclepius were often visited for medical reasons. Kos, the island where the 5th century BCE doctor Hippocrates was believed to have taught, housed a sanctuary of Asclepius. Similarly, the 2nd century surgeon Galen practiced near a Temple of Asclepius in Pergamon. Tourists sought out these sites hoping for medical advice or aid. In both Classical Greece and Ancient Rome, the sick flocked to the temple of Asclepius in Epidaurus seeking treatments for their ailments. Whilst remaining at the sanctuary, they lodged in a katagogion (καταγώγιο), a guest house with 160 rooms. Stelae found near the site exalt the potency of its remedies; they claim that it provided cures, some of which are miraculous. Following the Roman conquest of Greece in the 2nd century BCE, the temple remained popular. Aelius Aristides, a 2nd century CE Greek rhetorician, documented his experiences with medical tourism in his Sacred Tales. After becoming ill, Aristides traveled across the Mediterranean; he claimed to be guided by messages sent by Asclepius. Celsus, a Roman medical scholar, advocated for long sea voyages as a treatment for tuberculosis. He believed that maritime travel could treat the disease by providing a fresh change of air. Celsus argued that the journey from Italy to Alexandria was perfect for such a trip. Sacred spas and springs also attracted medical tourists. One such spring was located in the Roman town of Aquae Sulis, now the modern city of Bath, England.
