= Ambulacrum =

Church architectural term

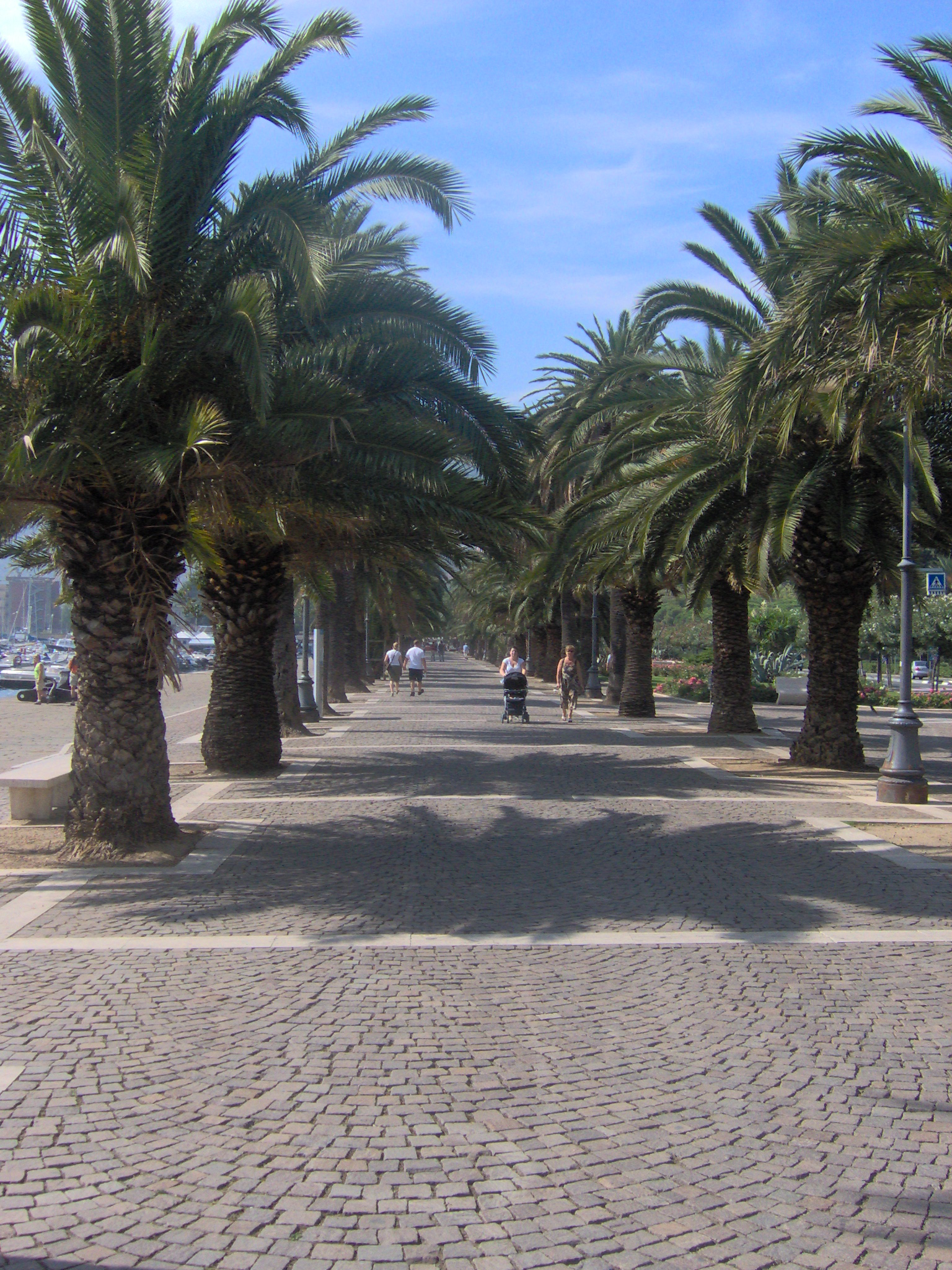
Ambulacrum (Walking path example)

Ambulacrum is an architectural word that denotes an atrium, courtyard, or parvise in front of a basilica or church that is surrounded by arcades or colonnades, or trees, and which often contains a fountain. It also can denote a walking path that trees delineate.

== Roman ==
In the Roman architecture, the term ambulatio or ambulacrum was used to designate walkways or corridors delineated on both sides by plants or colonnades.

== Etymology ==
From the Latin 'ambulācrum', meaning 'walk planted with trees', 'avenue', 'alley' and 'walking place' Derives from' 'ambulāre', meaning 'to walk' or 'Amble' meaning 'To walk slowly or leisurely'.

Has Indo-European roots - deriving from 'Ambhi'

== Sources ==
- James Stevens Curl, A Dictionary of Architecture and Landscape Architecture (Oxford University Press, 2006)
- Yegül, F.K.; Favro, D.G. (2019). "ambulatio". Roman Architecture and Urbanism: From the Origins to Late Antiquity. Cambridge EBA Collection. Cambridge University Press. ISBN 978-0-521-47071-1.
