= Ecce Romani =

Latin textbook

- 1971 first edition of Volume 1
- Author: Gilbert Lawall
- Cover artist: Yao Zen Liu
- Series: Ecce Romani
- Set in: 80 CE
- Publisher: Prentice Hall
- Publication date: 1971
- Media type: Textbook
- ISBN: 0-133-61089-6

Ecce Romani is a reading-based Latin program. The first two books feature the Cornelians, a rich family from Rome during the late 1st century CE. The third book focuses on Roman stories and mythology. The title of the series translates to Look! The Romans!

== Formatting ==
Each chapter in Ecce Romani features a story written in Latin. Under it is a list of new or unfamiliar words in the text, with translations and short descriptions about the word. This will be followed by a grammar lesson, relating to the passage, and grammar practice. The chapter will then end with either cultural information, historical information, or something similar.

== Synopses ==
=== Ecce Romani I ===
The first book opens introducing the reader to the Cornelian family: Gaius, a Roman senator, Aurelia, the mother of two children, Cornelia, the younger sister of Marcus, who is the eldest child of the family. They are caring for Sextus, a boy whose mother died in the eruption of Mount Vesuvius in Pompeii, and whose father is away in the army, stationed in Asia Minor.

Gaius is told that he must return to Rome immediately, due to a session of the Senate being called by the emperor. The carriage the family is traveling in crashes in a ditch, where they remain for a large duration of the story. After several chapters, the carriage is eventually fixed. The family eventually reaches Rome, where they are greeted by Titus, Gaius' father.

=== Ecce Romani II ===
The Cornelius family reaches the city of Rome after leaving their country estate in Baiae, where they see famous Roman sites. The boys learn about the dangers of the city, including urban fires and theft/robbery. Sextus runs after a thief who took his clothes from a bath house, also there is no more info on Flavia

== Publication history ==
The series began in 1971 with the publication of Ecce Romani 1: Meeting the Family.
