= Plinia gens =

Ancient Roman family

The gens Plinia was a plebeian family at ancient Rome. Few members of this gens are mentioned in history, and the Plinii are best known from the scholar and antiquarian, Gaius Plinius Secundus, author of the Historia Naturalis, who lived during the first century AD.

== Origin ==
Several Plinii came from Comum and the surrounding region, and this may have been the family's origin. Cisalpine Gaul had received Latin rights in 89 BC, during the Social War, and then full Roman citizenship through the Lex Roscia in 49. Evidence of an element, prin-, is found in proper names from the Lepontic area between the fourth and first centuries BC. In this region, fluidity between /l/ and /r/ is very frequent.

== Praenomina ==
The main praenomina of the Plinii are Gaius, Lucius, and Publius, three of the most common names throughout Roman history. Other common names are occasionally found, including Gnaeus, Marcus, Titus, Quintus, and Sextus.

== Members ==
This list includes abbreviated praenomina. For an explanation of this practice, see filiation.

- Lucius Plinius L. f. Rufus, praetor designatus in 36 BC, served as legate of Sextus Pompeius, and given command of western Sicily. He surrendered after Pompeius' defeat.
- Gaius Plinius Secundus, otherwise known as "Pliny the Elder", the first century scholar and antiquarian, devoted his life to compiling knowledge of the natural world. He was a friend of Vespasian, and in command of the Roman fleet at Misenum in AD 79, when he was suffocated by fumes from the eruption of Vesuvius.
- Plinia Marcella, the sister of Pliny the Elder, married Gaius Caecilius, and was the mother of Gaius Caecilius Cilo, afterward Pliny the Younger. After her husband's death, she lived with her brother. Together with her brother and her son, she witnessed the eruption of Vesuvius in 79 A.D. (It was she who pointed out the eruption to her brother)
- Gaius Plinius L. f. Caecilius Secundus, born Gaius Caecilius Cilo, the nephew of the elder Pliny, by whom he was adopted after the death of his father. He held a number of magistracies, culminating in the consulship in AD 100, and was subsequently governor of Bithynia and Pontus. He left a wealth of letters that are of interest to historians.
- Marcus Plinius Gallus, aedile in AD 46.
- Gaius Plinius Valerianus, a physician who died at the age of twenty-two. A work on various diseases and their cures in five books has been attributed to him, under the title, Medicinae Plinianae, but there is little evidence linking him to it. The work seems to date to the fourth century.

=== Plinii from inscriptions ===
- Gaius Plinius, named in an inscription from Albanum in Latium.
- Publius Plinius, named in an inscription from Mediolanum.
- Publius Plinius M. f., named in an inscription from Casilinum in Campania.
- Gaius Plinius Abscantus, buried at Rome, together with Gaius Plinius Phosphorus.
- Gaius Plinius Aristonicus, dedicated a tomb at Rome for his daughter, Plinia Aristothemis, and wife, Atria Tertia.
- Plinia C. f. Aristothemis, daughter of Gaius Plinius Aristonicus and Atria Tertia.
- Publius Plinius Burrus, named in an inscription from Gallia Transpadana, together with Publius Plinius Paternus.
- Gaius Plinius Calvus, one of the Sodales Augustales, buried at Comum in Gallia Transpadana.
- Plinius Cerdo, mentioned in a funerary inscription from Comum.
- Gaius Plinius Damophilus, buried at Dertona in Liguria.
- Gaius Plinius Donatus, buried at Carthage in Africa Proconsularis, aged twenty-five.
- Plinia Euphrosyne, wife of Gaius Plinius Soterichianus, buried at Rome, aged thirty-five.
- Gaius Plinius M. f. Faustus, a priest of Augustus, and one of the municipal officials at Noviodunum in Helvetia, buried at Genava in Gallia Narbonensis.
- Plinius Germanus, a freedman buried at Rome.
- Gnaeus Plinius Homuncio, named in an inscription from Rome; perhaps the father of Lucius Plinius Latinus and Titus Plinius Priscus, named in an adjacent inscription.
- Lucius Plinius Cn. f. Latinus, a soldier in the third urban cohort at Rome. He may have been the brother of Titus Plinius Priscus, named in the same inscription.
- Lucius Plinius Nigrinus, one of the municipal duumvirs, and a priest of Jupiter Dolichenus at Ostia in AD 147.
- Gaius Plinius Oppianus, a scout named in an inscription from Rome, dating to about AD 144.
- Publius Plinius Paternus, named in an inscription from Gallia Transpadana, together with Publius Plinius Burrus.
- Lucius Plinius L. l. Peregrinus, a freedman buried at Brundisium in Calabria, aged thirty, between 20 BC and AD 50.
- Plinius Phaenomenus, mentioned in a funerary inscription from Comum.
- Gaius Plinius Philocalus, named in an inscription from Comum.
- Gaius Plinius Phosphorus, buried at Rome, together with Gaius Plinius Abscantus.
- Titus Plinius Cn. f. Priscus, a soldier in the third urban cohort at Rome. He may have been the brother of Lucius Plinius Latinus, named in the same inscription.
- Plinius Proculus, son of Plinius Restutus and Domitia Augustiana, buried at Corfinium in Samnium, aged one year, ten months, and three days.
- Plinius Restutus, husband of Domitia Augustiana, and father of Plinius Proculus, an infant buried at Corfinium.
- Plinius Rufinus, named in an inscription from Vicus Maracitanus in Africa Proconsularis.
- Lucius Plinius C. f. Sabinus, the son of Gaius Plinius Faustus, buried at Genava.
- Gaius Plinius Soterichianus, dedicated a tomb at Rome to his wife, Plinia Euphrosyne.
- Gaius Plinius Secundus Veronensis, named in an inscription from Verona in Venetia and Histria, might refer to Pliny the Elder, or a member of his family.
- Lucius Plinius Sex. f. Secundus, a soldier in the twentieth legion, buried at Municipium Montanensium in Moesia Inferior, by his will freed his slaves, Lucius Plinius and Publius Mestrius.
- Marcus Caecilius Plinius, buried at Mediolanum.
- Quintus Mursius Q. f. Plinius Minervianus, one of the municipal officials at Pola in Venetia and Histria in AD 227.

== See also ==
- List of Roman gentes

== Bibliography ==
- Appianus Alexandrinus (Appian), Bellum Civile (The Civil War).
- Dictionary of Greek and Roman Biography and Mythology, William Smith, ed., Little, Brown and Company, Boston (1849).
- Theodor Mommsen et alii, Corpus Inscriptionum Latinarum (The Body of Latin Inscriptions, abbreviated CIL), Berlin-Brandenburgische Akademie der Wissenschaften (1853–present).
- Mélanges d'Archéologie et d'Histoire de l'École Française de Rome (Archaeological and Historical Collections of the French School at Rome, abbreviated MEFR), Paris, Rome (1881–present).
- Bulletin Archéologique du Comité des Travaux Historiques et Scientifiques (Archaeological Bulletin of the Committee on Historic and Scientific Works, abbreviated BCTH), Imprimerie Nationale, Paris (1885–1973).
- René Cagnat et alii, L'Année épigraphique (The Year in Epigraphy, abbreviated AE), Presses Universitaires de France (1888–present).
- T. Robert S. Broughton, The Magistrates of the Roman Republic, American Philological Association (1952–1986).
