= Rectina =

Roman woman who was a friend of Pliny the Elder

Rectina was a friend of the Roman author Pliny the Elder. During the eruption of Vesuvius in 79 CE, Pliny received a message from her, which prompted him to set sail with galleys and a cutter to observe what was happening at closer range, and to attempt to rescue some of the people of the towns at the foot of the volcano. Pliny's ships were unable to approach the shore to rescue Rectina. It is not documented whether she survived. Pliny himself died after putting ashore further down the coast.

Pliny the Younger says that Rectina was married to a man named Bassus or Tascius or Tascus; the name is rendered differently by different translators. Nothing is known for certain about either Rectina or her husband's identity.

== In modern literature ==
Rectina appears as a character in book 2 of Caroline Lawrence's dramatic fiction series "The Roman Mysteries" written for children. In that story, she appears as wife of Tascius Pomponianus of Stabia.

Several scenes in Robert Harris' bestselling novel Pompeii are set in the Villa of the Papyri, just before the eruption engulfed it. In this story, the villa is claimed to belong to Roman aristocrat Pedius Cascus and his wife Rectina. At the start of the eruption, Rectina prepares to have the library evacuated and sends urgent word to her old friend, Pliny the Elder, who commands the Roman Navy at Misenum on the other side of the Bay of Naples. Pliny immediately sets out in a warship, and gets in sight of the villa, but the eruption prevents him from docking and saving Rectina and her library – which is thus left for modern archaeologists to find.
