= Pomponianus =

1st century AD Roman senator

Pomponianus was a Roman Senator who was present at Stabiae during the eruption of Mount Vesuvius in AD 79. He attempted to escape by ship, but was stuck on shore because the prevailing wind was not favorable and prevented his departure.

His personal friend, the noted author and military commander Pliny the Elder, sailed from across the Bay of Naples to rescue him. Amidst the ongoing disaster, Pomponianus and Pliny waited in the town overnight for the wind to change, after which their party was forced to decide whether to remain inside and risk the collapse of the roof above them due to the build-up of falling pumice and ash, or to attempt to escape outside and risk being buried. Pliny the Elder subsequently died during the attempted escape.
