= El Ksour =

- Commune and town
- Location within Tunisia
- Coordinates: 35°53′54″N 8°52′50″E
- Country: Tunisia
- Governorate: Kef Governorate

Population (2014)
  - Total: 5,576
- Time zone: UTC+1 (CET)
- Website: www.commune-elkossour.gov.tn

El Ksour (Arabic: القصور) is a town and commune in the Kef Governorate, Tunisia. As of 2004 it had a population of 5,357. It is located 7.2 kilometres (4.5 mi) to the southeast of Dahmani. The Ancient Roman site Vicus Maracitanus is located to the south. The town contains some fine Berber architecture.

== Population ==
2014 Census (Municipal)
Homes	Families	Males	Females	Total
1661	1451	2812	2764	5576

== See also ==
- List of cities in Tunisia
