= Aufidius Bassus =

Roman historian who lived in the reign of Tiberius

Aufidius Bassus was a renowned Roman historian and orator who lived in the reign of Augustus and Tiberius.

Bassus was a man much admired in Rome for his eloquence. He drew up an account of the Roman wars in Germany. Uncertainty in his health perhaps prevented him from holding a public office. He suddenly died of illness, leaving his works unfinished.

His work, which probably began with the Roman civil wars or the death of Julius Caesar up to the end of the Sejanus, or perhaps Tiberius, was continued in thirty-one books by Pliny the Elder. Pliny the Elder carried it down at least as far as the end of Nero's reign. Bassus' other historical work was a Bellum Germanicum, which was published before his Histories.

Seneca the Elder speaks highly of Bassus as a historian; however, the fragments preserved in that writer's Suasoriae (vi. 23) relating to the death of Cicero are characterized by an affected style.
