= Pliny the Elder =

Roman military commander and writer (AD23/24–79)

- Gaius Plinius Secundus
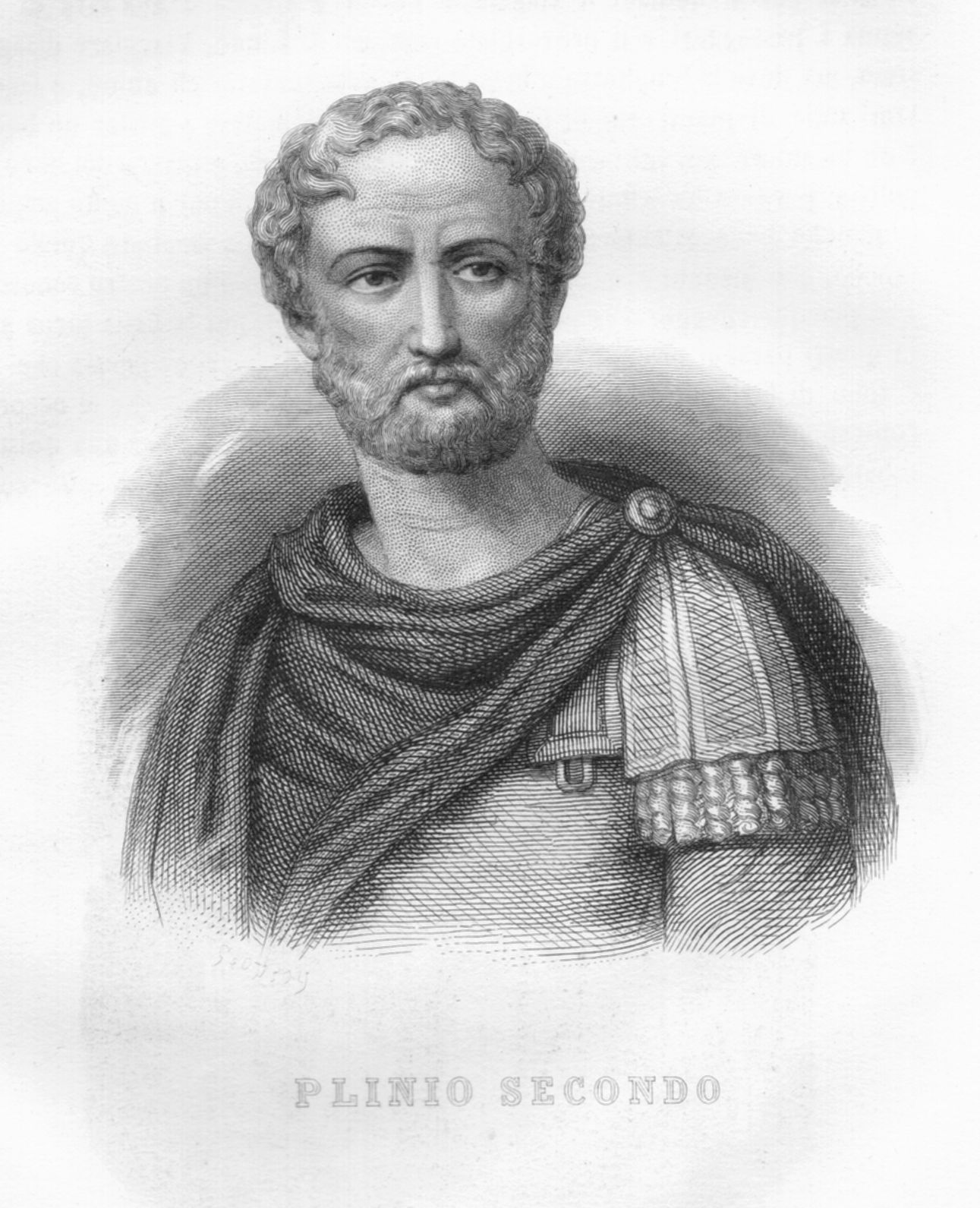
- 19th-century portrait of Pliny the Elder
- Born: AD 23 or 24; Novum Comum, Roman Empire
- Died: 25 August AD 79 (aged 54–56); Stabiae, Roman Empire
- Occupations: Lawyer, author, naturalist, military commander, provincial governor
- Notable work: Naturalis Historia
- Children: Pliny the Younger (nephew adopted in the Elder's will)

Gaius Plinius Secundus (23 or 24 – 25 August 79), known in English as Pliny the Elder (/ˈplɪni/ PLIN-ee), was a Roman author, naturalist, scientist, naval and army commander of the early Roman Empire, procurator, and friend of Emperor Vespasian. Pliny wrote the encyclopedic Naturalis Historia (Natural History), a thirty-seven-volume work covering a vast array of topics on human knowledge and the natural world, which became an editorial model for encyclopedias. He spent most of his spare time studying, writing, and investigating natural and geographic phenomena in the field.

Pliny produced seven works spanning 102 volumes, of which only Natural History survives. Among the lost works was the twenty-volume Bella Germaniae (Wars of Germania), used as a source by other prominent Roman historians including Plutarch, Tacitus, and Suetonius. Tacitus may have used Bella Germaniae as the primary source for his work, De origine et situ Germanorum (On the Origin and Situation of the Germani). Also substantial was the thirty-one-volume history A fine Aufidii Bassi, which extended Aufidius Bassus' earlier historical work to Pliny's day.

Pliny the Elder died in AD 79 in Stabiae while attempting to rescue people from the eruption of Mount Vesuvius. In his will, Pliny the Elder posthumously adopted his nephew Gaius Plinius Caecilius Secundus, who is known to history as Pliny the Younger.

== Life and times ==
=== Background ===
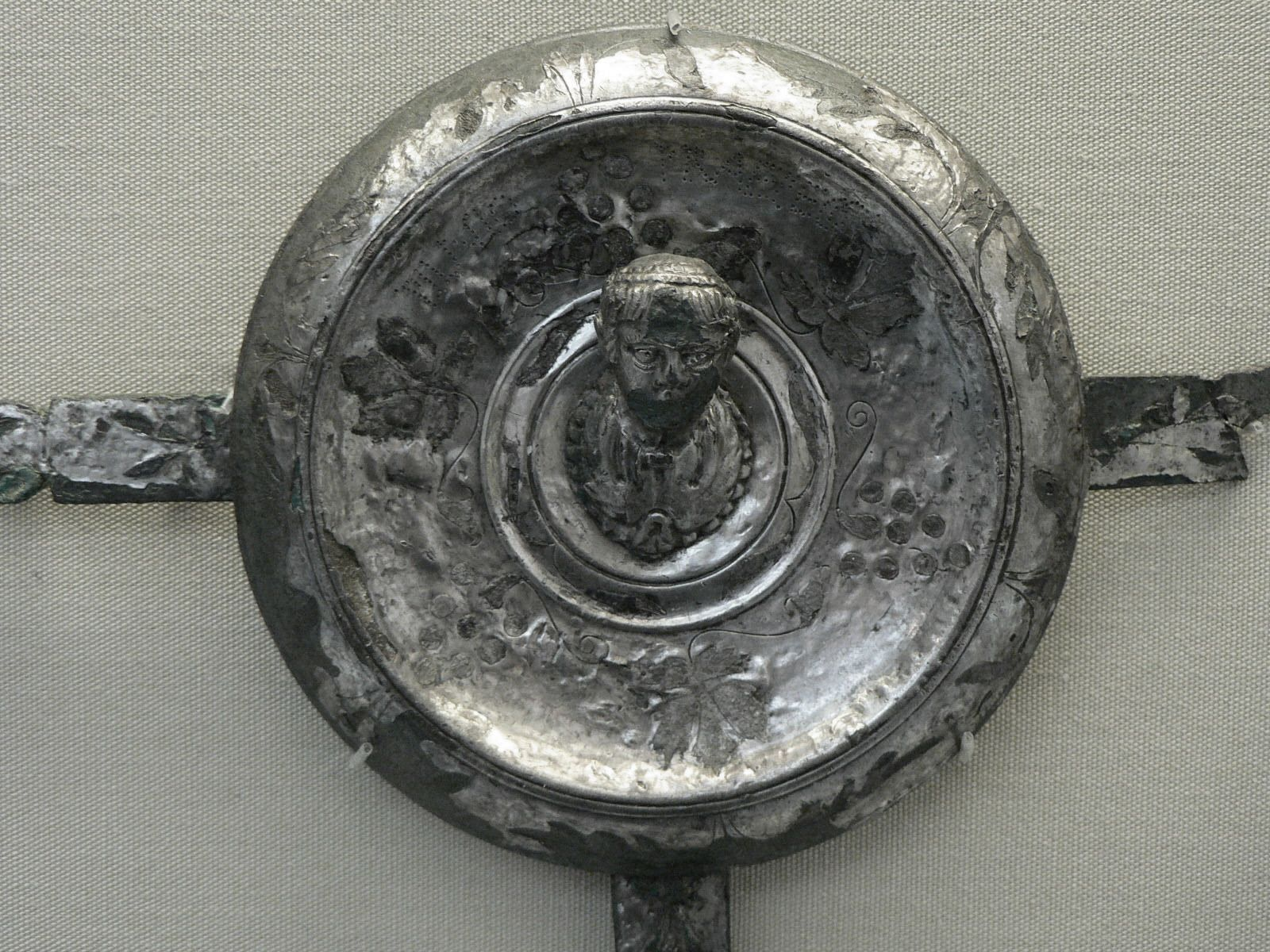
One of the Xanten Horse-Phalerae located in the British Museum, measuring 10.5 cm (4.1 in). It bears an inscription formed from punched dots: PLINIO PRAEF EQ; i.e., Plinio praefecto equitum, "Pliny prefect of cavalry". It was perhaps issued to every man in Pliny's unit. The figure is the bust of the emperor.

Pliny's dates are pinned to the eruption of Mount Vesuvius in AD 79 and a statement by his nephew that he died in his 56th year, which would put his birth in AD 23 or 24.

Pliny was the son of an equestrian Gaius Plinius Celer and his wife, Marcella. Neither the Elder nor the Younger Pliny mention these names. Their ultimate source is a fragmentary inscription (CIL V 1 3442) found in a field in Verona and recorded by the 16th-century Augustinian friar Onofrio Panvinio. The form is an elegy. The most commonly accepted reconstruction is:

PLINIVS SECVNDVS AVGV. LERI. PATRI. MATRI. MARCELLAE. TESTAMENTO FIERI IVSSO

Plinius Secundus augur ordered this to be made as a testament to his father [Ce]ler and his mother [Grania] Marcella

The actual words are fragmentary. The reading of the inscription depends on the reconstruction, but in all cases the names come through. Whether he was an augur and whether she was named Grania Marcella are less certain. Jean Hardouin presents a statement from an unknown source that he claims was ancient, that Pliny was from Verona and that his parents were Celer and Marcella. Hardouin also cites the contrary (see below) of Catullus.

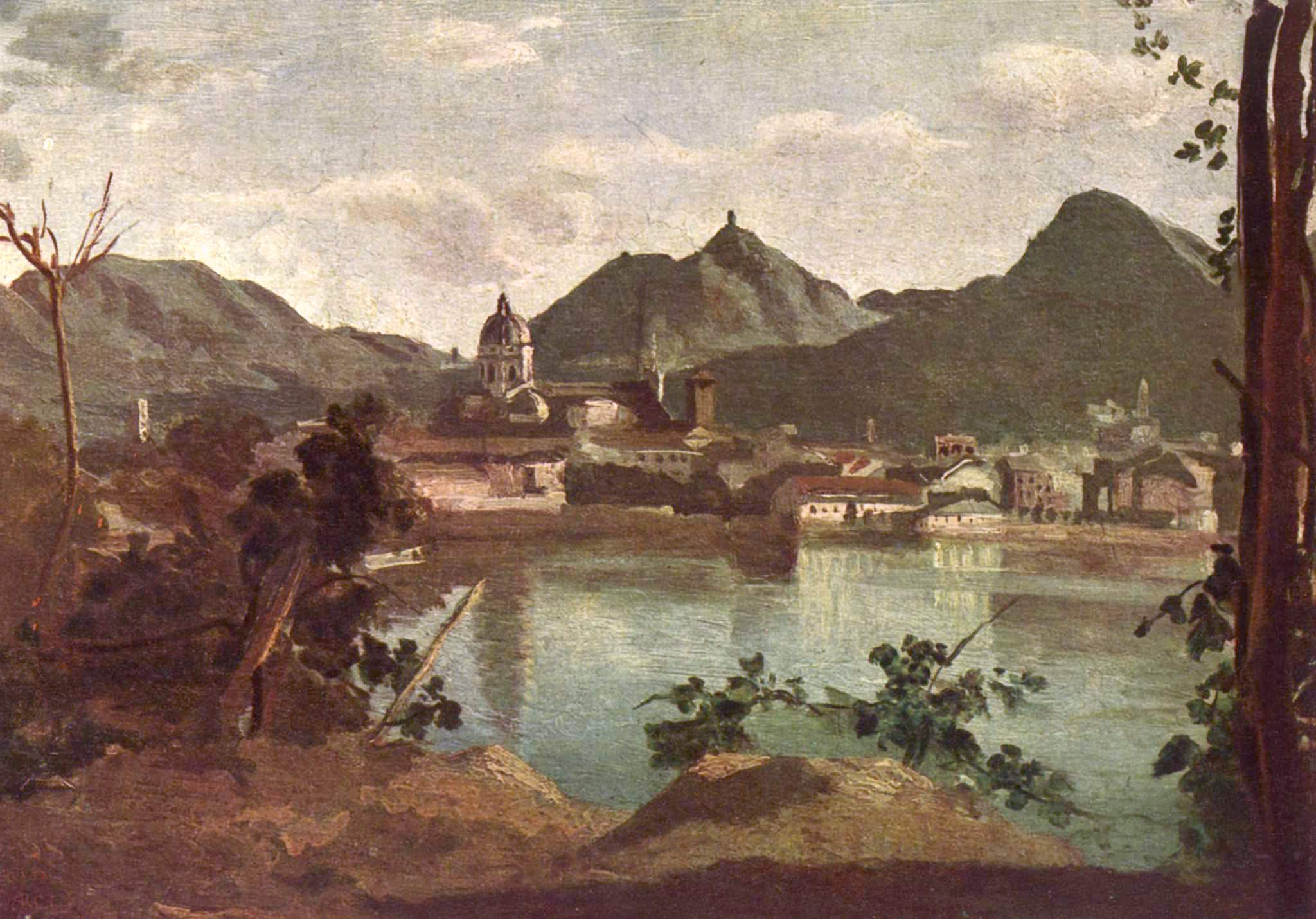
City and Lake of Como, painted by Jean-Baptiste-Camille Corot, 1834

How the inscription got to Verona is unknown, but it could have arrived by dispersal of property from Pliny the Younger's estate at Colle Plinio, north of Città di Castello, identified with certainty by his initials in the roof tiles. He kept statues of his ancestors there. Pliny the Elder was born at Como, not at Verona: it is only as a native of old Gallia Transpadana that he calls Catullus of Verona his conterraneus, or fellow-countryman, not his municeps, or fellow-townsman. A statue of Pliny on the façade of the Como Cathedral celebrates him as a native son. He had a sister, Plinia, who married into the Caecilii and was the mother of his nephew, Pliny the Younger, whose letters describe his work and study regimen in detail.

In one of his letters to Tacitus (avunculus meus), Pliny the Younger details how his uncle's breakfasts would be light and simple (levis et facilis) following the customs of our forefathers (veterum more interdiu). Pliny the Younger wanted to convey that Pliny the Elder was a "good Roman", which means that he maintained the customs of the great Roman forefathers. This statement would have pleased Tacitus.

Two inscriptions identifying the hometown of Pliny the Younger as Como take precedence over the Verona theory. One (CIL V 5262) commemorates the younger's career as the imperial magistrate and details his considerable charitable and municipal expenses on behalf of the people of Como. Another (CIL V 5667) identifies his father Lucius' village as present-day Fecchio (tribe Oufentina), a hamlet of Cantù, near Como. Therefore, Plinia likely was a local girl and Pliny the Elder, her brother, was from Como.

Gaius was a member of the Plinia gens: the Insubric root Plina still persists, with rhotacism, in the local surname "Prina". He did not take his father's cognomen, Celer, but assumed his own, Secundus. As his adopted son took the same cognomen, Pliny founded a branch, the Plinii Secundi. The family was prosperous; Pliny the Younger's combined inherited estates made him so wealthy that he could found a school and a library, endow a fund to feed the women and children of Como, and own numerous estates around Rome and Lake Como, as well as enrich some of his friends as a personal favor. No earlier instances of the Plinii are known.

In 59 BC, only about 82 years before Pliny's birth, Julius Caesar founded Novum Comum (reverting to Comum) as a colonia to secure the region against the Alpine tribes, whom he had been unable to defeat. He imported a population of 4,500 from other provinces to be placed in Comasco and 500 aristocratic Greeks to found Novum Comum itself. The community was thus multi-ethnic and the Plinies could have come from anywhere. Whether any conclusions can be drawn from Pliny's preference for Greek words, or Julius Pokorny's derivation of the name from north Italic as "bald" is a matter of speculative opinion. No record of any ethnic distinctions in Pliny's time is apparent—the population considered themselves to be Roman citizens.

Pliny the Elder did not marry and had no children. After his death, he left his estate to his adopted nephew, Pliny the Younger. This adoption was probably testamentary, wherein Pliny the Younger assumed the name "Plinius" while gaining nothing recognizable by Roman jurisprudence beyond what was already guaranteed as an heir. The amount of interaction between the two Plinies before this is uncertain, though Pliny the Younger wrote about his adopted father with some familiarity, and for at least some time Pliny the Elder resided in the same house in Misenum with his sister and nephew; they were living there when Pliny the Elder decided to investigate the eruption of Mount Vesuvius, and was sidetracked by the need for rescue operations and a messenger from his friend Rectina asking for assistance.

=== Student and lawyer ===
Pliny's father took him to Rome to be educated in lawmaking. Pliny relates that he saw Marcus Servilius Nonianus.

=== Junior officer ===
In AD 46, at about age 23, Pliny entered the army as a junior officer, as was the custom for young men of equestrian rank. Ronald Syme, Plinian scholar, reconstructs three periods at three ranks.

Pliny's interest in Roman literature attracted the attention and friendship of other men of letters in the higher ranks, with whom he formed lasting friendships. Later, these friendships assisted his entry into the upper echelons of the state; however, he was trusted for his knowledge and ability, as well. According to Syme, he began as a praefectus cohortis, a "commander of a cohort" (an infantry cohort, as junior officers began in the infantry), under Gnaeus Domitius Corbulo, himself a writer (whose works did not survive) in Germania Inferior. In AD 47, he took part in the Roman conquest of the Chauci and the construction of the canal between the rivers Maas and Rhine. His description of the Roman ships anchored in the stream overnight having to ward off floating trees has the stamp of an eyewitness account.

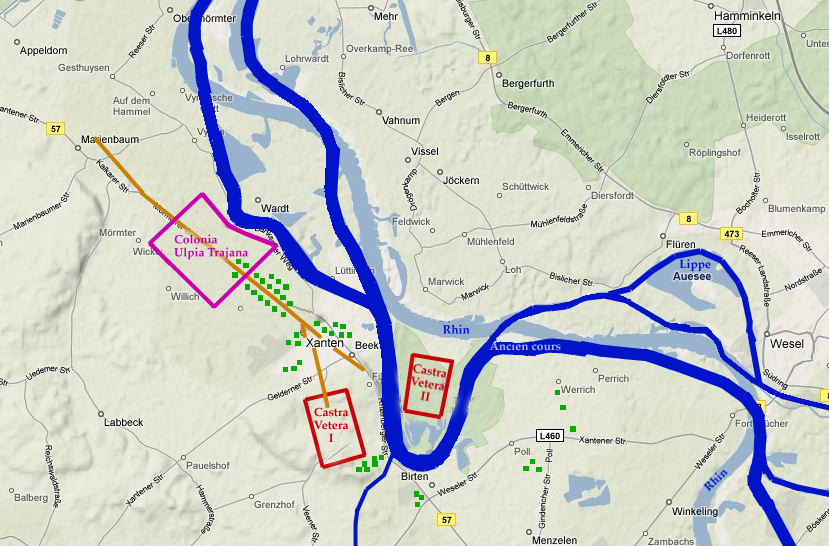
Map of Castra Vetera, a large permanent base (castra stativa) of Germania Inferior, where Pliny spent the last of his 10-year term as a cavalry commander: The proximity of a naval base there means that he trained also in ships, as the Romans customarily trained all soldiers in all arms whenever possible. The location is on the lower Rhine River.

At some uncertain date, Pliny was transferred to the command of Germania Superior under Publius Pomponius Secundus with a promotion to military tribune, which was a staff position, with duties assigned by the district commander. Pomponius was a half-brother of Corbulo. They had the same mother, Vistilia, a powerful matron of the Roman upper classes, who had seven children by six husbands, some of whom had imperial connections, including a future empress. Pliny's assignments are not clear, but he must have participated in the campaign against the Chatti of AD 50, at age 27, in his fourth year of service. Associated with the commander in the praetorium, he became a familiar and close friend of Pomponius, who also was a man of letters.

At another uncertain date, Pliny was transferred back to Germania Inferior. Corbulo had moved on, assuming command in the east. This time, Pliny was promoted to praefectus alae, "commander of a wing", responsible for a cavalry battalion of about 480 men. He spent the rest of his military service there. A decorative phalera, or piece of harness, with his name on it has been found at Castra Vetera, modern Xanten, then a large Roman army and naval base on the lower Rhine. Pliny's last commander there, apparently neither a man of letters nor a close friend of his, was Pompeius Paullinus, governor of Germania Inferior AD 55–58. Pliny relates that he personally knew Paulinus to have carried around 12,000 pounds of silver service on which to dine in a campaign against the Germani (a practice which would not have endeared him to the disciplined Pliny).

According to his nephew, during this period, he wrote his first book (perhaps in winter quarters when more spare time was available), a work on the use of missiles on horseback, De Jaculatione Equestri ("On the Use of the Dart by Cavalry"). It has not survived, but in Natural History, he seems to reveal at least part of its content, using the movements of the horse to assist the javelin-man in throwing missiles while astride its back. During this period, he also dreamed that the spirit of Drusus Nero begged him to save his memory from oblivion. The dream prompted Pliny to begin forthwith a history of all the wars between the Romans and the Germani, which he did not complete for some years.

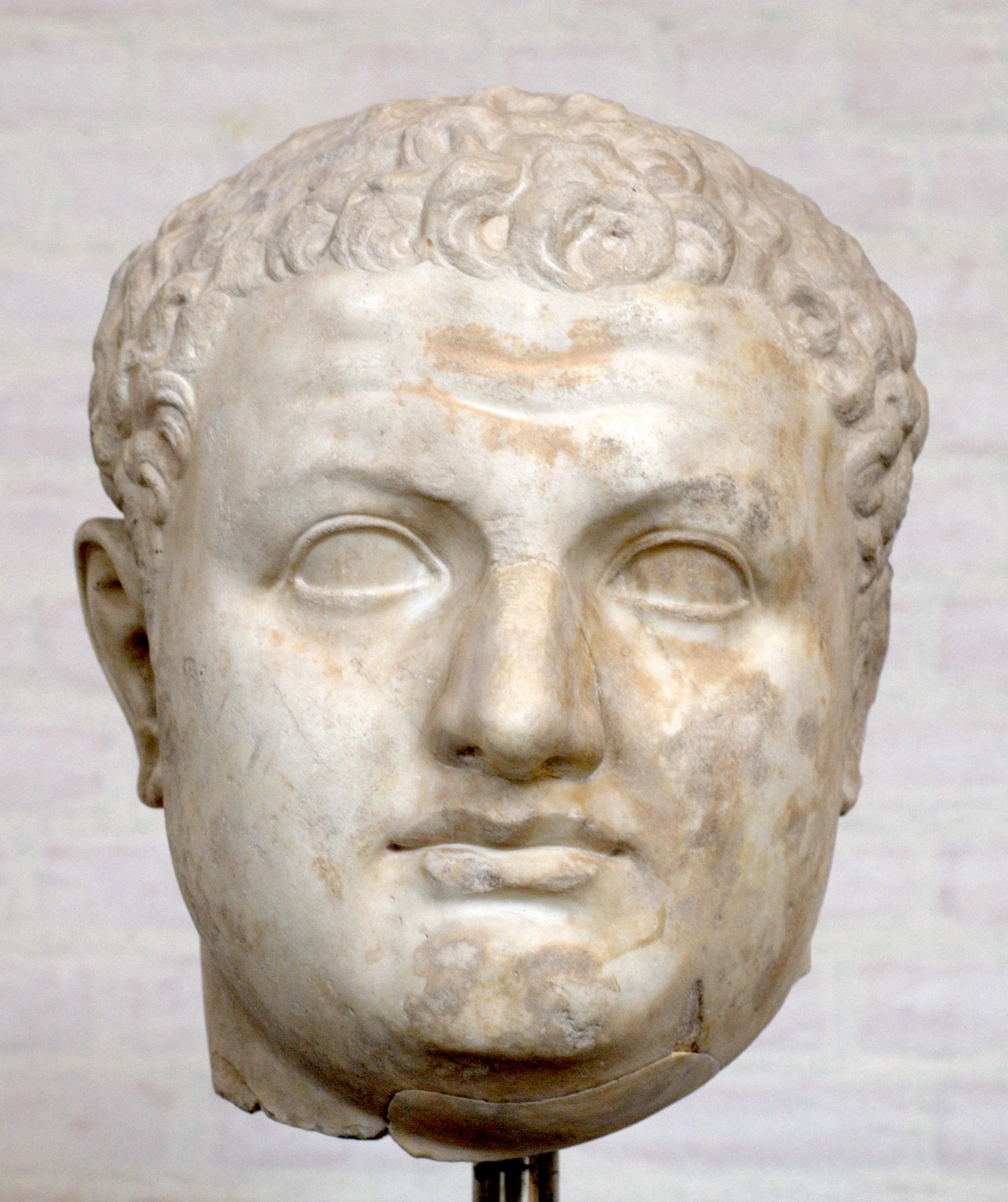
Colossal head of Titus, son of Vespasian. Glyptothek, Munich

=== Literary interlude ===
At the earliest time that Pliny could have left the service, Nero, the last of the Julio-Claudian dynasty, had been emperor for two years. He did not leave office until AD 68, when Pliny was 45 years old. During that time, Pliny did not hold any high office or work in the service of the state. In the subsequent Flavian dynasty, his services were in such demand that he had to give up his law practice, which suggests that he had been trying not to attract the attention of Nero, who was a dangerous acquaintance.

Under Nero, Pliny lived mainly in Rome. He mentions the map of Armenia and the neighbourhood of the Caspian Sea, which was sent to Rome by the staff of Corbulo in 58. He also witnessed the construction of Nero's Domus Aurea or "Golden House" after the Great Fire of Rome in 64.

Besides pleading law cases, Pliny wrote, researched, and studied. His second published work was The Life of Pomponius Secundus, a two-volume biography of his old commander, Pomponius Secundus.

Meanwhile, he was completing his monumental work, Bella Germaniae, the only authority expressly quoted in the first six books of the Annales of Tacitus, and probably one of the principal authorities for the same author's Germania. It disappeared in favor of the writings of Tacitus (which are far shorter), and, early in the fifth century, Symmachus had little hope of finding a copy.

Like Caligula, Nero seemed to grow gradually more insane as his reign progressed. Pliny devoted much of his time to writing on the comparatively safe subjects of grammar and rhetoric. He published a three-book, six-volume educational manual on rhetoric, entitled Studiosus, "The Student". Pliny the Younger says of it: "The orator is trained from his very cradle and perfected." It was followed by eight books entitled Dubii sermonis (Of Doubtful Phraseology). These are both now lost works. His nephew relates: "He wrote this under Nero, in the last years of his reign, when every kind of literary pursuit which was in the least independent or elevated had been rendered dangerous by servitude."

In 68, Nero no longer had any friends and supporters. He committed suicide, and the reign of terror was at an end, as was the interlude in Pliny's obligation to the state.

=== Senior officer ===
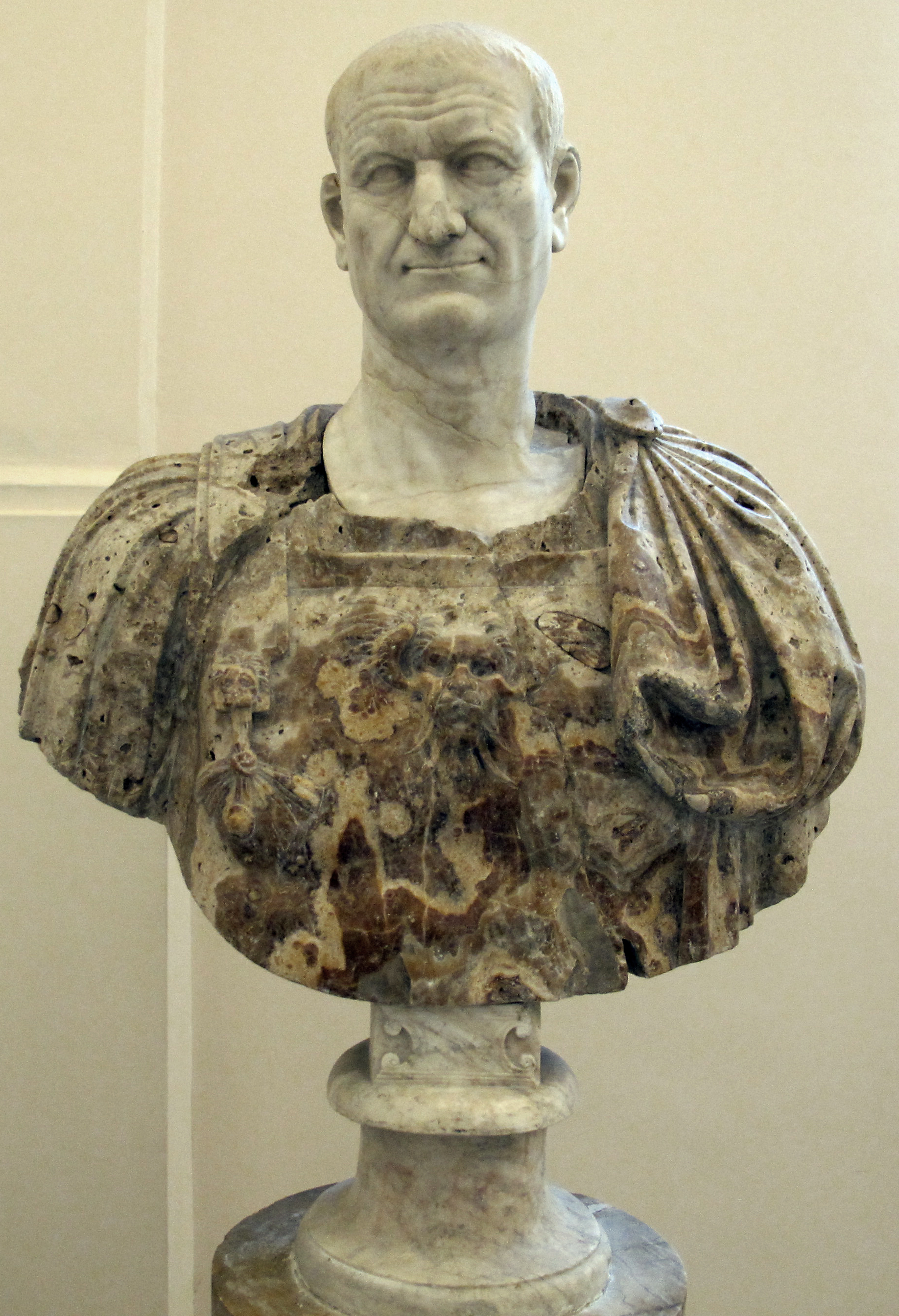
Bust of Vespasian

At the end of AD 69, after a year of civil war consequent on the death of Nero, Vespasian, a successful general, became emperor. Like Pliny, he had come from the equestrian class, rising through the ranks of the army and public offices and defeating the other contenders for the highest office. His main tasks were to re-establish peace under imperial control and to place the economy on a sound footing. He needed in his administration all the loyalty and assistance he could find. Pliny, apparently trusted without question, perhaps (reading between the lines) recommended by Vespasian's son Titus, was put to work immediately and was kept in a continuous succession of the most distinguished procuratorships, according to Suetonius. A procurator was generally a governor of an imperial province. The empire was perpetually short of, and was always seeking, officeholders for its numerous offices.

Throughout the latter stages of Pliny's life, he maintained good relations with Emperor Vespasian. As is written in the first line of Pliny the Younger's Avunculus Meus:

Ante lucem ibat ad Vespasianum imperatorem (nam ille quoque noctibus utebatur), deinde ad officium sibi delegatum.

Before dawn he was going to Emperor Vespasian (for he also made use of the night), then he did the other duties assigned to him.

In this passage, Pliny the Younger conveys to Tacitus that his uncle was ever the academic, always working. The word ibat (imperfect, "he used to go") gives a sense of repeated or customary action. In the subsequent text, he mentions again how most of his uncle's day was spent working, reading, and writing. He notes that Pliny "was indeed a very ready sleeper, sometimes dropping off in the middle of his studies and then waking up again."

A definitive study of the procuratorships of Pliny was compiled by the classical scholar Friedrich Münzer, which was reasserted by Ronald Syme and became a standard reference point. Münzer hypothesized four procuratorships, of which two are certainly attested and two are probable but not certain. However, two does not satisfy Suetonius' description of a continuous succession. Consequently, Plinian scholars present two to four procuratorships, the four comprising (i) Gallia Narbonensis in 70, (ii) Africa in 70–72, (iii) Hispania Tarraconensis in 72–74, and (iv) Gallia Belgica in 74–76.

According to Syme, Pliny may have been "successor to Valerius Paulinus", procurator of Gallia Narbonensis (southeastern France), early in AD 70. He seems to have a "familiarity with the provincia", which, however, might otherwise be explained. For example, he says

In the cultivation of the soil, the manners and civilization of the inhabitants, and the extent of its wealth, it is surpassed by none of the provinces, and, in short, might be more truthfully described as a part of Italy than as a province.

denoting a general popular familiarity with the region.

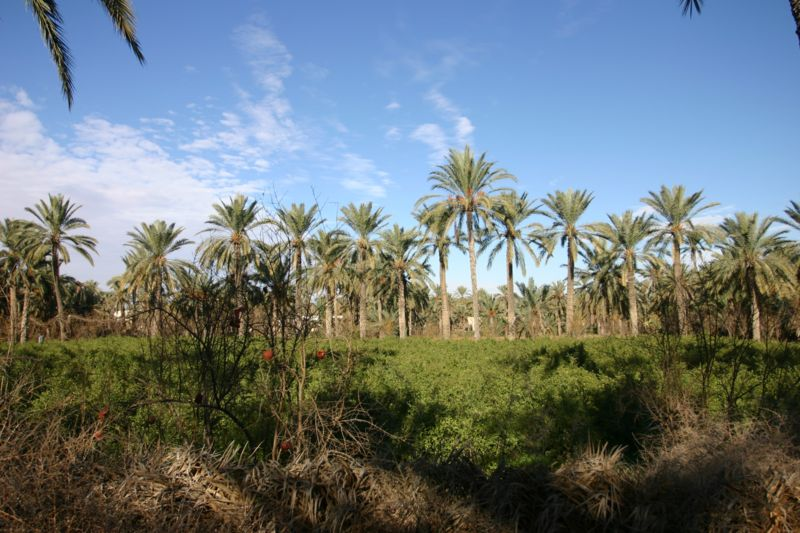
Oasis at Gabès

Pliny certainly spent some time in the province of Africa, most likely as a procurator. Among other events or features that he saw are the provoking of rubetae, poisonous toads (Bufonidae), by the Psylli; the buildings made with molded earthen walls, "superior in solidity to any cement;" and the unusual, fertile seaside oasis of Gabès (then Tacape), Tunisia, currently a World Heritage Site. Syme assigns the African procuratorship to AD 70–72.

The procuratorship of Hispania Tarraconensis was next. A statement by Pliny the Younger that his uncle was offered 400,000 sesterces for his manuscripts by Larcius Licinius while he (Pliny the Elder) was procurator of Hispania makes it the most certain of the three. Pliny lists the peoples of "Hither Hispania", including population statistics and civic rights (modern Asturias and Gallaecia). He stops short of mentioning them all for fear of "wearying the reader". As this is the only geographic region for which he gives this information, Syme hypothesizes that Pliny contributed to the census of Hither Hispania conducted in 73/74 by Vibius Crispus, legate from the Emperor, thus dating Pliny's procuratorship there.

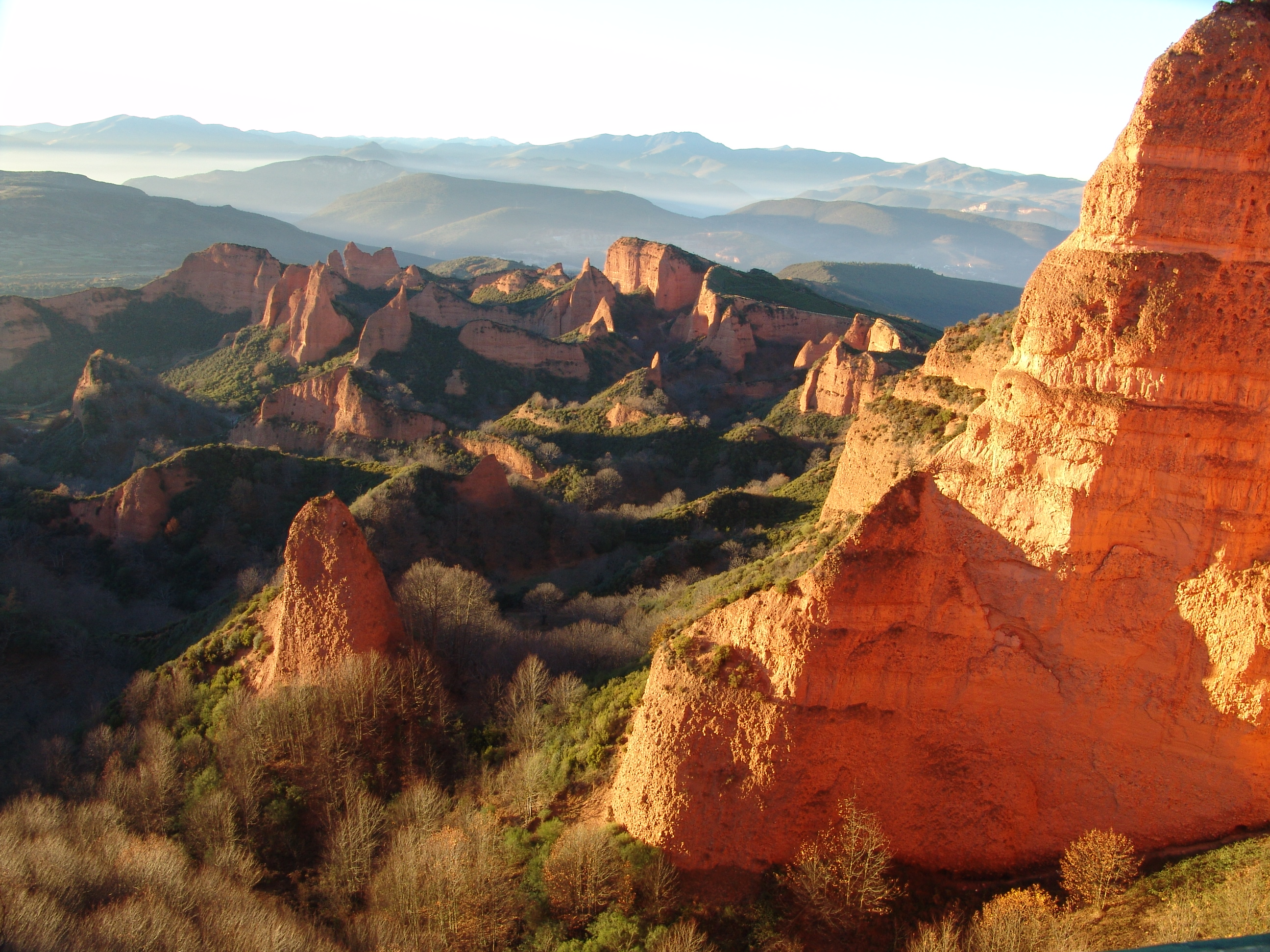
Las Médulas, Spain, site of a large Roman mine

During his stay in Hispania, he became familiar with the agriculture and especially the gold mines of the north and west of the country. His descriptions of the various methods of mining appear to be eyewitness judging by the discussion of gold mining methods in his Natural History. He might have visited the mine excavated at Las Médulas.

The Porta Nigra Roman gate, Trier, Germany

The last position of procurator, an uncertain one, was of Gallia Belgica, based on Pliny's familiarity with it. The capital of the province was Augusta Treverorum (Trier), named for the Treveri surrounding it. Pliny says that in "the year but one before this" a severe winter killed the first crops planted by the Treviri; they sowed again in March and had "a most abundant harvest." The problem is to identify "this", the year in which the passage was written. Using 77 as the date of composition Syme arrives at AD 74–75 as the date of the procuratorship, when Pliny is presumed to have witnessed these events. The argument is based entirely on presumptions; nevertheless, this date is required to achieve Suetonius' continuity of procuratorships, if the one in Gallia Belgica occurred.

Pliny was allowed home (Rome) at some time in AD 75–76. He was presumably at home for the first official release of Natural History in 77. Whether he was in Rome for the dedication of Vespasian's Temple of Peace in the Forum in 75, which was in essence a museum for display of art works plundered by Nero and formerly adorning the Domus Aurea, is uncertain, as is his possible command of the vigiles (night watchmen), a lesser post. No actual post is discernible for this period. On the bare circumstances, he was an official agent of the emperor in a quasiprivate capacity. Perhaps he was between posts. In any case, his appointment as commander of the imperial fleet at Misenum took him there, where he resided with his sister and nephew. Vespasian died of disease on 23 June 79. Pliny outlived him by four months.

=== Noted author ===
During Nero's reign of terror, Pliny avoided working on any writing that would attract attention to himself. His works on oratory in the last years of Nero's reign (67–68) focused on form rather than on content. He began working on content again probably after Vespasian's rule began in AD 69, when the terror clearly was over and would not be resumed. It was to some degree reinstituted (and later cancelled by his son Titus) when Vespasian suppressed the philosophers at Rome, but not Pliny, who was not among them, representing, as he says, something new in Rome, an encyclopedist (certainly, a venerable tradition outside Italy).

In his next work, Bella Germaniae, Pliny completed the history which Aufidius Bassus left unfinished. Pliny's continuation of Bassus's History was one of the authorities followed by Suetonius and Plutarch. Tacitus also cites Pliny as a source. He is mentioned concerning the loyalty of Burrus, commander of the Praetorian Guard, whom Nero removed for disloyalty. Tacitus portrays parts of Pliny's view of the Pisonian conspiracy to kill Nero and make Piso emperor as "absurd" and mentions that he could not decide whether Pliny's account or that of Messalla was more accurate concerning some of the details of the Year of the Four Emperors. Evidently Pliny's extension of Bassus extended at least from the reign of Nero to that of Vespasian. Pliny seems to have known it was going to be controversial, as he deliberately reserved it for publication after his death:

It has been long completed and its accuracy confirmed; but I have determined to commit the charge of it to my heirs, lest I should have been suspected, during my lifetime, of having been unduly influenced by ambition. By this means I confer an obligation on those who occupy the same ground with myself; and also on posterity, who, I am aware, will contend with me, as I have done with my predecessors.

== Natural History ==
Pliny's last work, according to his nephew, was the Naturalis Historia (Natural History), an encyclopedia into which he collected much of the knowledge of his time. Some historians consider this to be the first encyclopedia written. It comprised 37 books. His sources were personal experience, his own prior works (such as the work on Germania), and extracts from other works. These extracts were collected in the following manner: One servant would read aloud, and another would write the extract as dictated by Pliny. He is said to have dictated extracts while taking a bath. In winter, he furnished the copier with gloves and long sleeves so his writing hand would not stiffen with cold (Pliny the Younger in avunculus meus). His extract collection finally reached about 160 volumes, which Larcius Licinius, the Praetorian legate of Hispania Tarraconensis, unsuccessfully offered to purchase for 400,000 sesterces. That would have been in 73/74 (see above). Pliny bequeathed the extracts to his nephew.

When composition of Natural History began is unknown. Since he was preoccupied with his other works under Nero and then had to finish the history of his times, he is unlikely to have begun before 70. The procuratorships offered the ideal opportunity for an encyclopedic frame of mind. The date of an overall composition cannot be assigned to any one year. The dates of different parts must be determined, if they can, by philological analysis (the post mortem of the scholars).

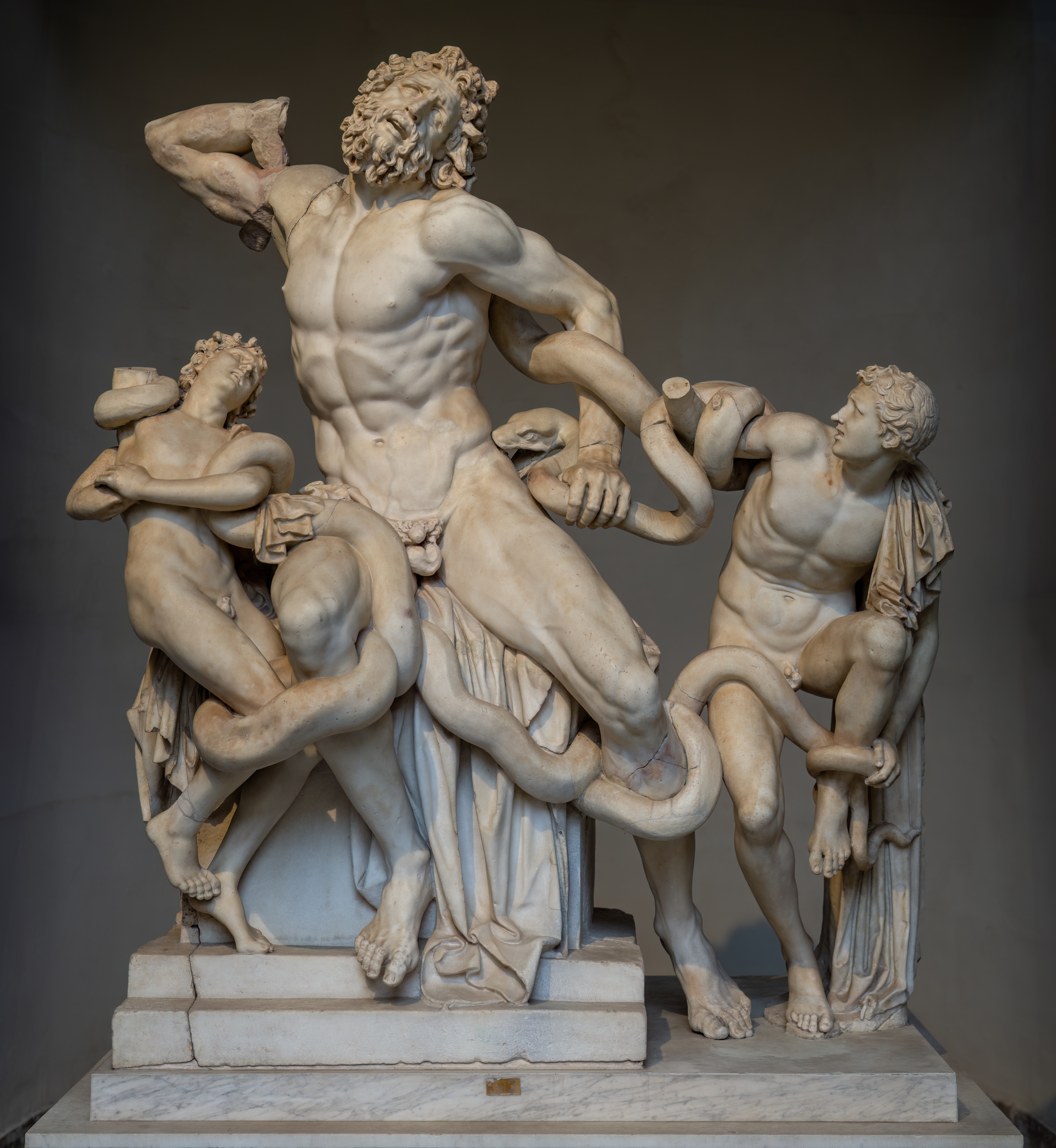
Laocoön and His Sons, a sculpture admired by Pliny

The closest known event to a single publication date, that is, when the manuscript was probably released to the public for borrowing and copying, and was probably sent to the Flavians, is the date of the Dedication in the first of the 37 books. It is to the imperator Titus. As Titus and Vespasian had the same name, Titus Flavius Vespasianus, earlier writers hypothesized a dedication to Vespasian. Pliny's mention of a brother (Domitian) and joint offices with a father, calling that father "great", points certainly to Titus.

Pliny also says that Titus had been consul six times. The first six consulships of Titus were in 70, 72, 74, 75, 76, and 77, all conjointly with Vespasian, and the seventh was in 79. This brings the date of the Dedication probably to 77. In that year, Vespasian was 68. He had been ruling conjointly with Titus for some years. The title imperator does not indicate that Titus was sole emperor, but was awarded for a military victory, in this case that in Jerusalem in 70.

Aside from minor finishing touches, the work in 37 books was completed in AD 77. That it was written entirely in 77 or that Pliny was finished with it then cannot be proved. Moreover, the dedication could have been written before publication, and it could have been published either privately or publicly earlier without the dedication. The only certain fact is that Pliny died in AD 79.

Natural History is one of the largest single works to have survived from the Roman Empire and was intended to cover the entire field of ancient knowledge, based on the best authorities available to Pliny. He claims to be the only Roman ever to have undertaken such a work. It encompasses the fields of botany, zoology, astronomy, geology, and mineralogy, as well as the exploitation of those resources. It remains a standard work for the Roman period and the advances in technology and understanding of natural phenomena at the time. His discussions of some technical advances are the only sources for those inventions, such as hushing in mining technology or the use of water mills for crushing or grinding grain. Much of what he wrote about has been confirmed by archaeology. It is virtually the only work that describes the work of artists of the time, and is a reference work for the history of art. As such, Pliny's approach to describing the work of artists informed Lorenzo Ghiberti in writing his commentaries in the 15th century, and Giorgio Vasari, who wrote the celebrated Lives of the Most Excellent Painters, Sculptors, and Architects in 1550.

=== Natural History as the First Encyclopedia ===
Some historians consider Natural History to be the first encyclopedia ever written. It was the earliest encyclopedia to survive. There were many ancient histories written before Pliny the Elder's Natural History, but scholars still recognize Natural History as an encyclopedia, setting it apart from the other ancient histories. Regardless of if it was first, it is certainly the most significant. Through Natural History, Pliny the Elder gives modern experts a view into meanings of various things from first century Rome in a way that no other surviving text does. Each book of the Natural History covers a different topic, and the work is meant to cover every topic. Given the organization of the work, it is clear that it was meant to be a reference resource. Even modern scholars will sometimes compare an unknown object mentioned in a different ancient text with the objects described by Pliny and make comparisons. Modern scholars are also able to use Natural History to understand the traditions, fantasies, and prejudices in Ancient Rome.

The work became a model for all later encyclopedias in terms of the breadth of subject matter examined, the need to reference original authors, and a comprehensive index list of the contents. It is the only work by Pliny to have survived, and the last that he published, lacking a final revision at his sudden and unexpected death in the AD 79 eruption of Mount Vesuvius.

== Death ==
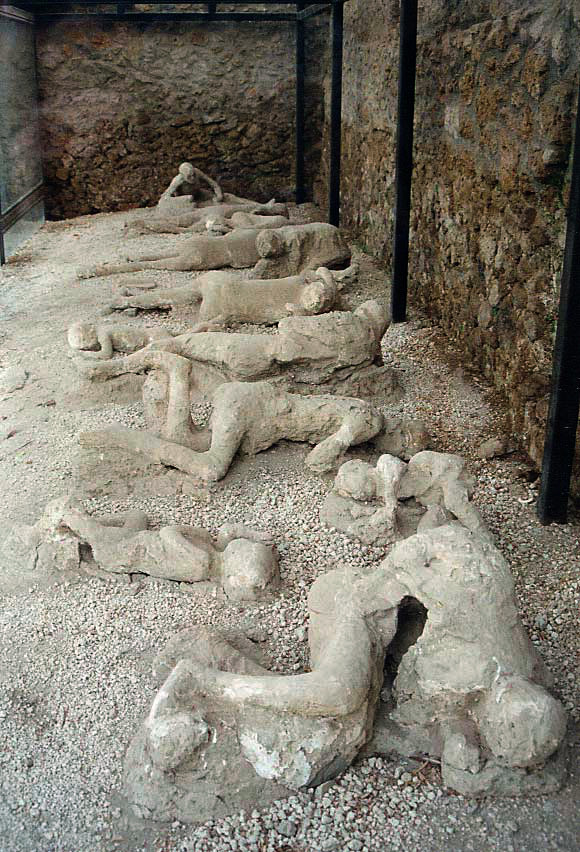
Plaster casts of the casualties from pyroclastic surges

Pliny, who had been appointed praefectus classis (admiral) in the Roman navy by Vespasian, was stationed with the fleet at Misenum at the time of the eruption of Mount Vesuvius. On the 24th of August at around one in the afternoon, Pliny was informed of an unusual cloud in the distance by his sister, and he began making preparations to investigate. The mission suddenly became one of rescue when a message arrived containing an urgent plea for help from his friend Rectina, who was stranded in Stabiae. Pliny boarded one of several galleys that he dispatched across the Gulf of Naples to Stabiae.

As Pliny's vessel approached the shore near Herculaneum, cinders and pumice began to fall on it. The helmsman advised turning back, to which Pliny replied, "Fortune favours the bold; steer to where Pomponianus is." Upon reaching Stabiae, they found Senator Pomponianus, but the same winds that brought them there prevented them from leaving. The group waited for the wind to abate, but they decided to leave later that evening for fear that their houses would collapse. The group fled when a plume of hot toxic gases engulfed them. Pliny, a corpulent man who suffered from a chronic respiratory condition, possibly asthma, died and was left behind. Upon the group's return three days later after the plume had dispersed, Pliny's body was found, with no apparent external injuries.

An account of Pliny the Elder's fatal journey to Stabiae is contained in a letter from Pliny the Younger to Tacitus, written twenty-seven years after the events transpired. The younger Pliny believed that his uncle had been killed by toxic gases. Suetonius shared an additional rumor that Pliny the Elder asked a slave to kill him to avoid heat from the volcano. In 1859, Jacob Bigelow, after summarizing the information about Pliny's death contained in Pliny the Younger's letter to Tacitus, concluded that Pliny had died from apoplexy (stroke) or heart disease. The dramatic circumstances of his death led encyclopédiste Louis de Jaucourt to assess that: "He is of particular interest to humanity for his tragic end, and to scholars worldwide for his writings, which are, in the arts and sciences, the most precious monuments of all antiquity."

== See also ==
- PLINIVS, a 2013 manga biography of Pliny
- Plinian eruption
- Plinius, lunar crater

== Sources ==
- Anguissola, Anna; Grüner, Andreas, eds. (2020). The nature of art : Pliny the Elder on materials. Turnhout, Belgium: Brepols. ISBN 9782503591179.
- Beagon, Mary. (1992). Roman Nature: The Thought of Pliny the Elder. Oxford: Oxford Univ. Press.
- The elder Pliny on the human animal: Natural History, Book 7. Translated by Beagon, Mary. Oxford University press. 2005. ISBN 0-19-815065-2.
- Carey, Sorcha (2006). Pliny's Catalogue of Culture: Art and Empire in the Natural history. Oxford University press. ISBN 0-19-920765-8.
- Doody, Aude. (2010). Pliny's Encyclopedia: The Reception of the Natural History. Cambridge, UK, and New York: Cambridge Univ. Press.
- Griffin, Miriam Tamara (1992). Seneca: A Philosopher in Politics (reprint ed.). Oxford University Press. ISBN 978-0-19-814774-9.
- Fane-Saunders, Peter. (2016). Pliny the Elder and the Emergence of Renaissance Architecture. New York: Cambridge University Press.
- French, Roger, and Frank Greenaway, eds. (1986). Science in the Early Roman Empire: Pliny the Elder, His Sources and Influence. London: Croom Helm.
- Gibson, Roy and Ruth Morello eds. (2011). Pliny the Elder: Themes and Contexts. Leiden: Brill.
- Healy, John F. (1999). Pliny the Elder on science and technology. Oxford University Press. ISBN 0-19-814687-6.
- Isager, Jacob (1991). Pliny on Art and Society: The Elder Pliny's Chapters on the History of Art. London & New York: Routledge. ISBN 0-415-06950-5.
- Laehn, Thomas R. (2013). Pliny's Defense of Empire. Routledge Innovations in Political Theory. New York: Routledge.
- Murphy, Trevor (2004). Pliny the Elder's Natural History: the Empire in the Encyclopedia. Oxford University Press. ISBN 0-19-926288-8.
- Ramosino, Laura Cotta (2004). Plinio il Vecchio e la tradizione storica di Roma nella Naturalis historia (in Italian). Alessandria: Edizioni del'Orso. ISBN 88-7694-695-0.
- Syme, Ronald (1969). "Pliny the Procurator". In Department of the Classics, Harvard University (ed.). Harvard studies in classical philology (illustrated ed.). Harvard University Press. pp. 201–236. ISBN 978-0-674-37919-0.
- Pliny the Elder. William P. Thayer (ed.). "Pliny the Elder: the Natural History" (in Latin and English). University of Chicago.
- Pliny the Elder (1855). "The Natural History". John Bostock, Henry Thomas Riley (translators and editors); Gregory R. Crane (Chief editor). Taylor and Francis; Tufts University: Perseus Digital Library. Archived from the original on 15 September 2008.
- Fisher, Richard V. "Derivation of the name 'Plinian'". University of California at Santa Barbara: The Volcano Information Center. Archived from the original on 6 December 2024.

=== Secondary material ===
- Pearse, Roger (2013). "The manuscripts of Pliny the Elder". Tertullian.org.
