= Alleius Nigidius Maius =

Politician and businessman in ancient Pompeii

Gnaeus Alleius Nigidius Maius (15–23 CE – 79 CE?) was a politician and wealthy businessman in ancient Pompeii who gained wide popularity with the citizens of the town through his sponsorship of gladiatorial games and other spectacles.

== Early life ==
Alleius Maius's mother was Pomponia Decharis and he was adopted at a relatively young age. His mother was buried in the tomb of Eumachia.

== Political career ==
Alleius Maius enjoyed a successful career in local Pompeian politics, having been elected aedile, duumvir and quinquennial duumvir (in 55 A.D.) before the age of forty. He gained wide popularity among the public through his sponsorship of gladiatorial games and many notices pertaining to the shows he sponsored have been uncovered during the excavations at Pompeii:

At the dedication of (Ocella) of the opus tabularum of Gnaeus Alleius Nigidius Maius, at Pompeii on 13 June, there will be a procession, hunt, athletics, and awnings.

Good fortune to Gnaeus Alleius Maius, the leading games-giver.

== Business career ==
After he exited public life, Alleius Maius concentrated on his private business interests and on the evidence of his private sponsorship of games, his palatial home, which is among the largest single properties in the town, and notices advertising rental properties. One of his businesses involved the leasing of residential and retail properties to tenants; among the surviving notices is the following advert:

To let from July 1. In the insula Arriana Polliana, property of Cnaius Alleius Nigidius Maius, commercial/residential units with mezzanines, quality upper floor apartments and houses. Agent: Primus, slave of Cnaius Alleius Nigidius Maius.

The fact that this sign was painted shortly before the eruption of Vesuvius also indicates that Allieus Maius was still alive as of that date. It is not known whether he survived the catastrophe.

== Priesthood ==
Alleius Maius and his daughter were also prominent in religious circles in Pompeii. One of the surviving notices refers to him as 'Priest (or Flamen) of Caesar Augustus' which might refer either to the Emperor Claudius or Vespasian, the title suggesting a position of some eminence. His daughter Alleia was also a public priestess and may have had a statue dedicated to her in the Macellum, which was the town's market building.

== House of Pansa ==
Unfortunately much of the decoration of his large home (also known as The House of Pansa) was destroyed in the eruption. However its size, location and layout indicate that it was one of the finest homes in the town. It was located near to the Forum almost directly opposite the Forum Baths, and it occupied an entire city block. The exterior, ground floor sections of the house were rented out as shops and the first floor as residential units. Allieus Maius and his family occupied the extensive ground floor, which featured an impressive atrium, multiple bedrooms (cubicula), several dining or recreational rooms and a peristyle featuring sixteen Ionic columns. The rear of the property had a veranda which overlooked an extensive garden area.

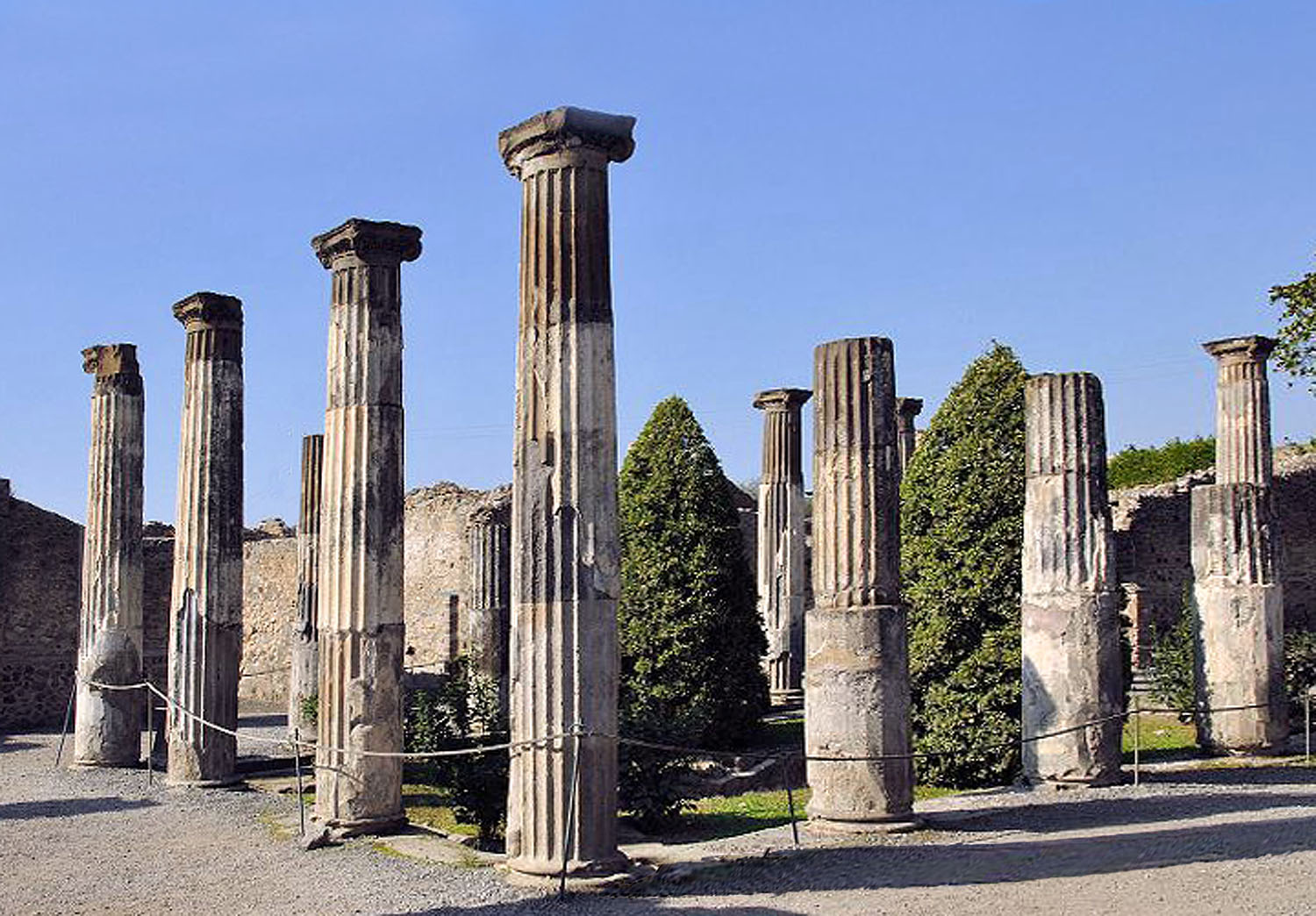
The peristyle of the House of Gnaeus Alleius Nigidius Maius (also known as The House of Pansa) in the ruined city of Pompeii
