= Eruption of Mount Vesuvius in 79 AD =

Volcanic eruption in Italy

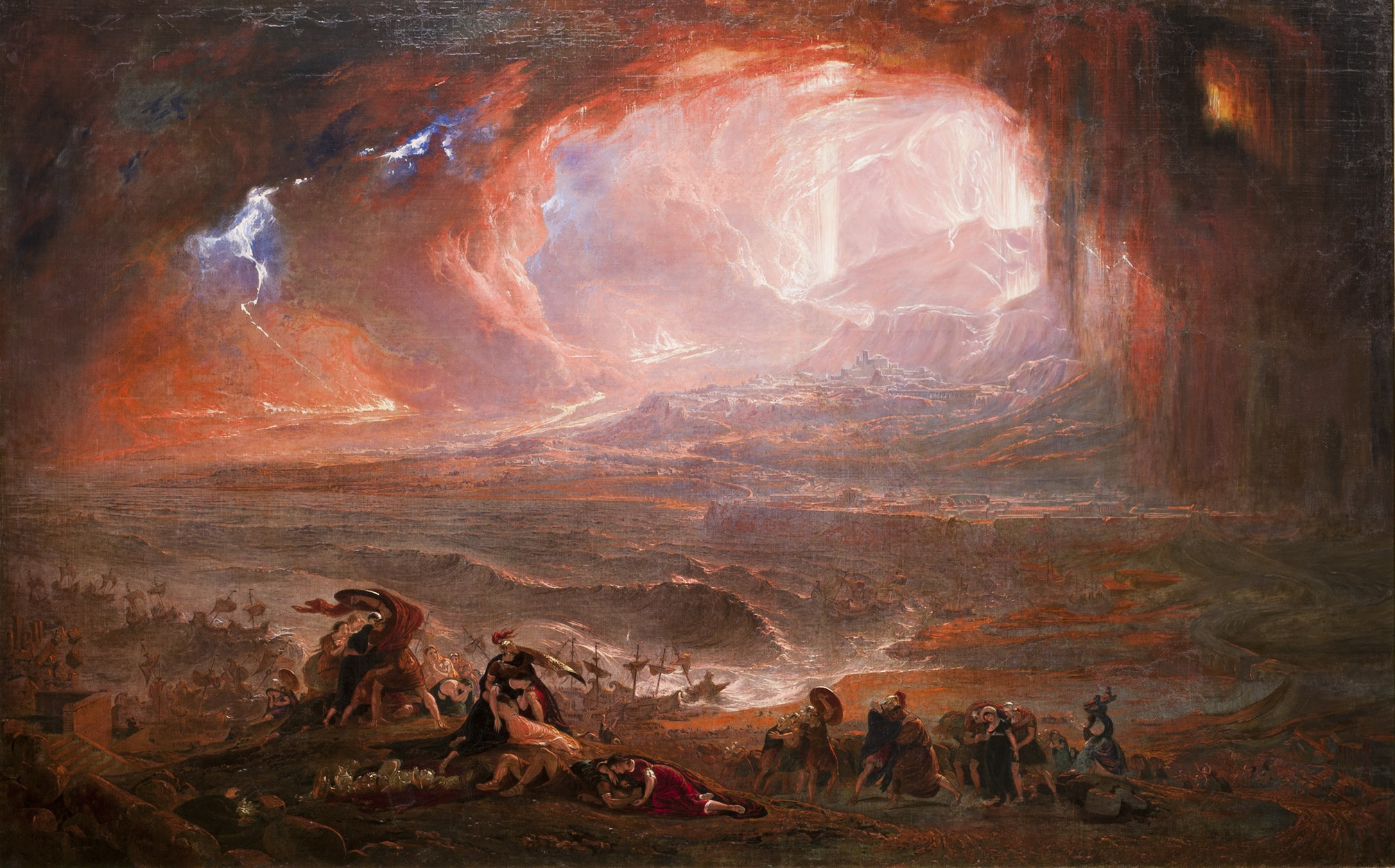
- The Destruction of Pompeii and Herculaneum (c. 1821) by John Martin
- Volcano: Mount Vesuvius
- Date: 79 AD
- Type: Plinian, Peléan
- Location: Campania, Italy; 40°49′17″N 14°26′34″E
- VEI: 5
- Impact: Buried the Roman settlements of Pompeii, Herculaneum, Oplontis, and Stabiae
- Deaths: 1,500–3,500, possibly up to 16,000 (Note: The number of confirmed deaths is around 1,500, with that many bodies having been found thus far.)

In 79 AD, Mount Vesuvius, a stratovolcano located in the modern-day region of Campania, Italy, erupted, causing one of the deadliest eruptions in history. Vesuvius violently ejected a cloud of super-heated tephra and gases to a height of 33 km (21 mi), ejecting molten rock, pulverized pumice and hot ash at 1.5 million tons per second, ultimately releasing 100,000 times the thermal energy of the atomic bombings of Hiroshima and Nagasaki. The event gives its name to the Vesuvian type of volcanic eruption, characterised by columns of hot gases and ash reaching the stratosphere, although the event also included pyroclastic flows associated with Peléan eruptions.

The event destroyed several Roman towns and settlements in the area. Pompeii and Herculaneum, obliterated and buried underneath massive pyroclastic surges and ashfall deposits, are the most famous examples. Archaeological excavations have revealed much of the towns and the lives of the inhabitants, leading to the area becoming Vesuvius National Park and a UNESCO World Heritage Site.

The total population of both cities was over 20,000. The remains of over 1,500 people have been found at Pompeii and Herculaneum. The total death toll from the eruption remains unknown.

A detailed firsthand account of the eruption is preserved in two letters of Pliny the Younger, who personally witnessed the event from the town of Misenum.

== Precursor earthquakes ==
The Last Day of Pompeii. Painting by Karl Brullov, 1830–1833

A major earthquake caused widespread destruction around the Bay of Naples, particularly to Pompeii, on February 5, 62 AD. Some of the damage had still not been repaired when the volcano erupted in 79 AD.

Another smaller earthquake took place in 64 AD; it was recorded by Suetonius in his biography of Nero, and by Tacitus in Annales because it took place while Nero was in Naples performing for the first time in a public theater. Suetonius recorded that the emperor continued singing through the earthquake until he had finished his song, while Tacitus wrote that the theater collapsed shortly after being evacuated.

Minor earthquakes were reported in the four days before the 79 AD eruption, but the warnings were not recognized. The inhabitants of the area surrounding Mount Vesuvius had been accustomed to minor tremors in the region; Pliny the Younger wrote that they "were not particularly alarming because they are frequent in Campania".

== Nature of the eruption ==
Reconstructions of the eruption and its effects vary considerably in the details but have the same overall features. The eruption lasted for two days. Pliny the Younger, author of the only surviving written testimony, described the morning before the eruption as normal; however, he was staying at Misenum, 29 kilometres (18 mi) from the volcano across the Bay of Naples. The first day of the eruption had little effect on Misenum. Pompeii is never mentioned in Pliny the Younger's letter.

In the early afternoon, Mount Vesuvius erupted violently, spewing up a high-altitude column from which ash and pumice began to fall, blanketing the area and causing roofs to collapse. Rescues and escapes occurred over the next few hours. One or more major earthquakes also occurred at this time making walls collapse and killing some refugees. These were accompanied by a mild tsunami in the Bay of Naples. At some time in the night or early the next day, pyroclastic flows in the close vicinity of the volcano began; lights seen on the mountain were interpreted as fires, and people as far away as Misenum fled for their lives.

The first pyroclastic flow left a few centimetres of ash immediately above the grey pumice but did not cause major damage. A second brief phase left a thin layer mainly of lava and pumice.

In the early morning, a second pyroclastic flow was rapid-moving, dense and very hot, knocking down many walls in its path, and incinerating or suffocating the remaining population. This thick layer of ash sealed many bodies in cavities which preserved their shapes and later allowed plaster casts devised by Giuseppe Fiorelli.

By the evening of the second day, the eruption stopped affecting Misenum, with only haze in the atmosphere, screening sunlight. Pliny the Younger wrote:

broad flames shone out in several places from Mount Vesuvius, which the darkness of the night contributed to render still brighter and clearer... It was now day everywhere else, but there a deeper darkness prevailed than in the thickest night.

=== Stratigraphic studies ===
Pompeii and Herculaneum, as well as other cities affected by the eruption of Mount Vesuvius. The black cloud represents the general distribution of ash, pumice and cinders. Modern coast lines are shown; Pliny the Younger was at Misenum.

Sigurðsson, Cashdollar, and Sparks undertook a detailed stratigraphic study of ash layers based on excavations and surveys, published in 1982. They concluded that the eruption unfolded in two phases, Vesuvian and Pelean, which alternated six times.

A first Plinian phase projected a column of volcanic debris and hot gases between 15 km (9 mi) and 30 km (19 mi) into the stratosphere. This phase lasted 18 to 20 hours and spread pumice and ashes, forming a 2.8 m (9 ft) layer to the south, towards Pompeii. An earthquake caused buildings in Pompeii to collapse at this time.

The following Pelean phase produced pyroclastic surges of molten rock and hot gases that reached as far as Misenum, to the west. Concentrated to the south and southeast, two pyroclastic surges engulfed Pompeii with a 1.8-metre-deep (6 ft) layer, burning and asphyxiating any living beings who had remained behind. Herculaneum, Pompeii, and Oplontis received the brunt of the surges and were buried in fine pyroclastic deposits, pulverized pumice and lava fragments up to 20 m (70 ft) deep. Surges 4 and 5 are believed to have destroyed and buried Pompeii. Surges are identified in the deposits by dune and cross-bedding formations, which are not produced by fallout.

The eruption is considered primarily phreatomagmatic, i.e. a blast driven by energy from escaping steam produced by seawater seeping into the deep-seated faults and interacting with hot magma.

==== Timing of explosions ====
In an article published in 2002, Sigurðsson and Casey concluded that an early explosion produced a column of ash and pumice which rained on Pompeii to the southeast but not on Herculaneum, which was upwind. Subsequently, the cloud collapsed as the gases densified and lost their capability to support their solid contents.

The authors suggest that the first ash falls are to be interpreted as early-morning, low-volume explosions not seen from Misenum, causing Rectina to send her messenger on a ride of several hours around the Bay of Naples, then passable, providing an answer to the paradox of how the messenger might miraculously appear at Pliny's villa so shortly after a distant eruption that would have prevented him.

=== Magnetic studies ===
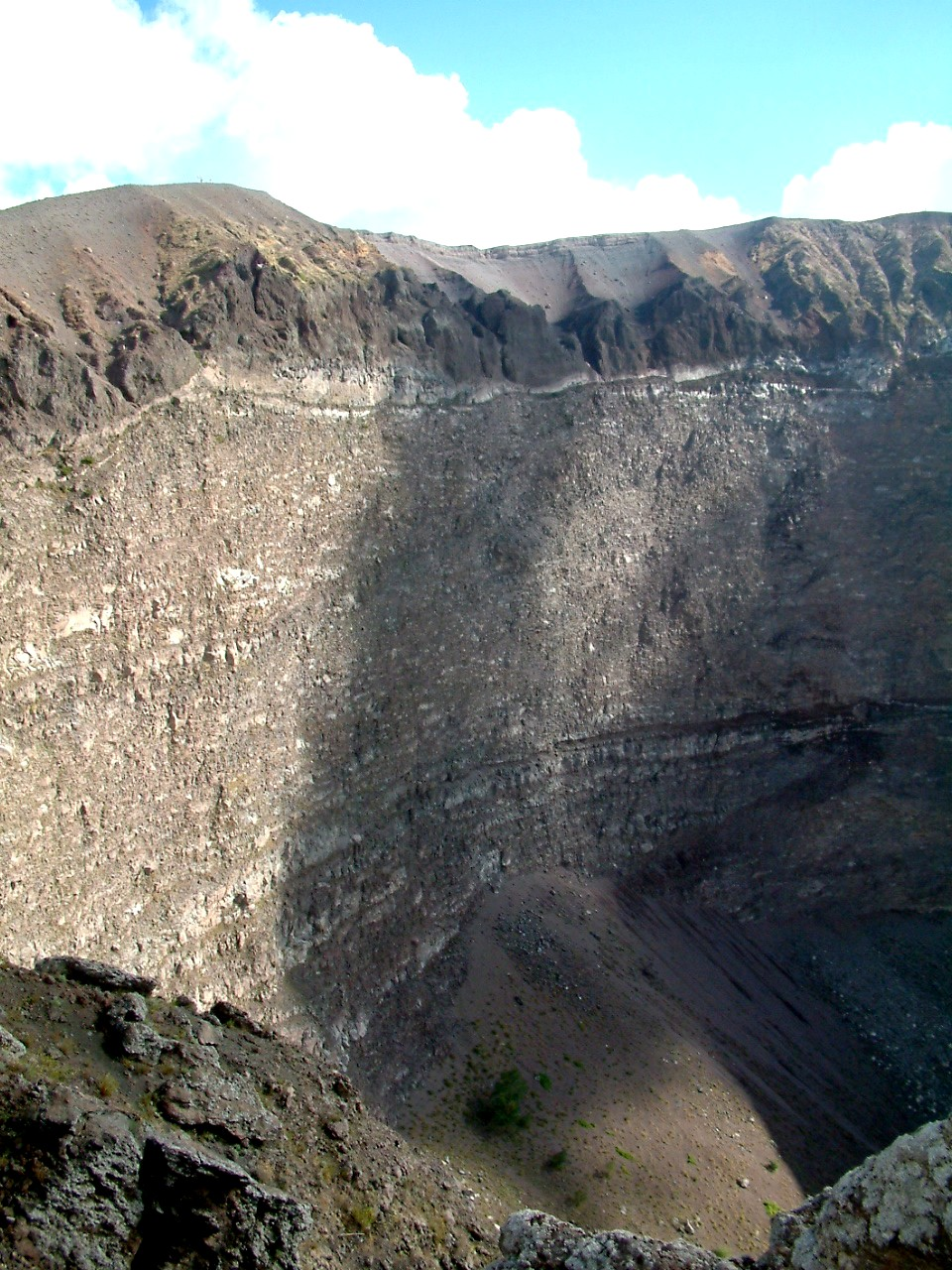
Inside the crater of Vesuvius

A 2006 study by Zanella, Gurioli, Pareschi, and Lanza used the magnetic characteristics of over 200 samples of lithic, roof-tile, and plaster fragments collected from pyroclastic deposits in and around Pompeii to estimate the equilibrium temperatures of the deposits. The deposits were placed by pyroclastic density currents (PDCs) resulting from the collapses of the Plinian column. The authors argue that fragments over 2–5 cm (0.8–2 in) were not in the current long enough to acquire its temperature, which would have been much higher. Therefore, they distinguish between the depositional temperatures, which they estimated, and the emplacement temperatures, which in some cases, based on the cooling characteristics of some types and fragment sizes of rocks they believed they also could estimate. The final figures are considered to be those of the rocks in the current just before deposition.

All crystal rock contains some iron or iron compounds, rendering it ferromagnetic, as do Roman roof tiles and plaster. These materials may acquire a residual field from several sources. When individual molecules, which are magnetic dipoles, are held in alignment by being bound in a crystalline structure, the small fields reinforce each other to form the rock's residual field. Heating the material adds internal energy to it. At the Curie temperature, the vibration of the molecules is sufficient to disrupt the alignment; the material loses its residual magnetism and assumes whatever magnetic field might be applied to it only for the duration of the application. The authors term this phenomenon unblocking. Residual magnetism is considered to "block out" non-residual fields.

A rock is a mixture of minerals, each with its own Curie temperature; the authors, therefore, looked for a spectrum of temperatures rather than a single temperature. In the ideal sample, the PDC did not raise the temperature of the fragment beyond the highest blocking temperature. Some constituent materials retained the magnetism the Earth's field imposed when the item was formed. The temperature was raised above the lowest blocking temperature; therefore, some minerals on recooling acquired the magnetism of the Earth as it was in 79 AD. The broad field of the sample was the vector sum of the fields of the high-blocking material and the low-blocking material.

This type of sample made it possible to estimate the low unblocking temperature. Using special equipment that measured field direction and strength at various temperatures, the experimenters raised the temperature of the sample in increments of 40 °C (70 °F) from 100 °C (210 °F) until it reached the low unblocking temperature. Deprived of one of its components, the overall field changed direction. A plot of direction at each increment identified the increment at which the sample's resultant magnetism had formed. That was considered the equilibrium temperature of the deposit. Considering the data for all the surge deposits arrived at a surge deposit estimate. The authors discovered that the city of Pompeii was a relatively cool spot within a much hotter field, which they attributed to the interaction of the surge with the "fabric" of the city.

The investigators reconstruct the sequence of volcanic events as follows:

- On the first day of the eruption, a fall of white pumice containing clastic fragments of up to 3 centimetres (1 in) fell for several hours. It heated the roof tiles to 120–140 °C (250–280 °F). This period would have been the last opportunity to escape. Subsequently, a second column deposited a grey pumice with clastics up to 10 cm (4 in), temperature unsampled, but presumed to be higher, for 18 hours. These two falls were the Plinian phase. The collapse of the edges of these clouds generated the first dilute PDCs, which must have been devastating to Herculaneum, but did not enter Pompeii.
- Early in the second morning, the grey cloud began to collapse to a greater degree. Two major surges struck and destroyed Pompeii. Herculaneum and all its population no longer existed. The emplacement temperature range of the first surge was 180–220 °C (360–430 °F), minimum temperatures; of the second, 220–260 °C (430–500 °F). The depositional temperature of the first was 140–300 °C (280–570 °F). Upstream and downstream of the flow it was 300–360 °C (570–680 °F).

The variable temperature of the first surge was due to interaction with the buildings. Any population remaining in structural refuges could not have escaped, as gases of incinerating temperatures surrounded the city. The lowest temperatures were in rooms under collapsed roofs. These were as low as 100 °C (212 °F), the boiling point of water. The authors suggest that elements of the bottom of the flow were decoupled from the main flow by topographic irregularities and made cooler by introducing turbulent ambient air. In the second surge, the irregularities were gone, and the city was as hot as the surrounding environment.

During the last surge, which was very dilute, an additional 1 metre (3.3 ft) of deposits fell over the region.

== The two Plinys ==
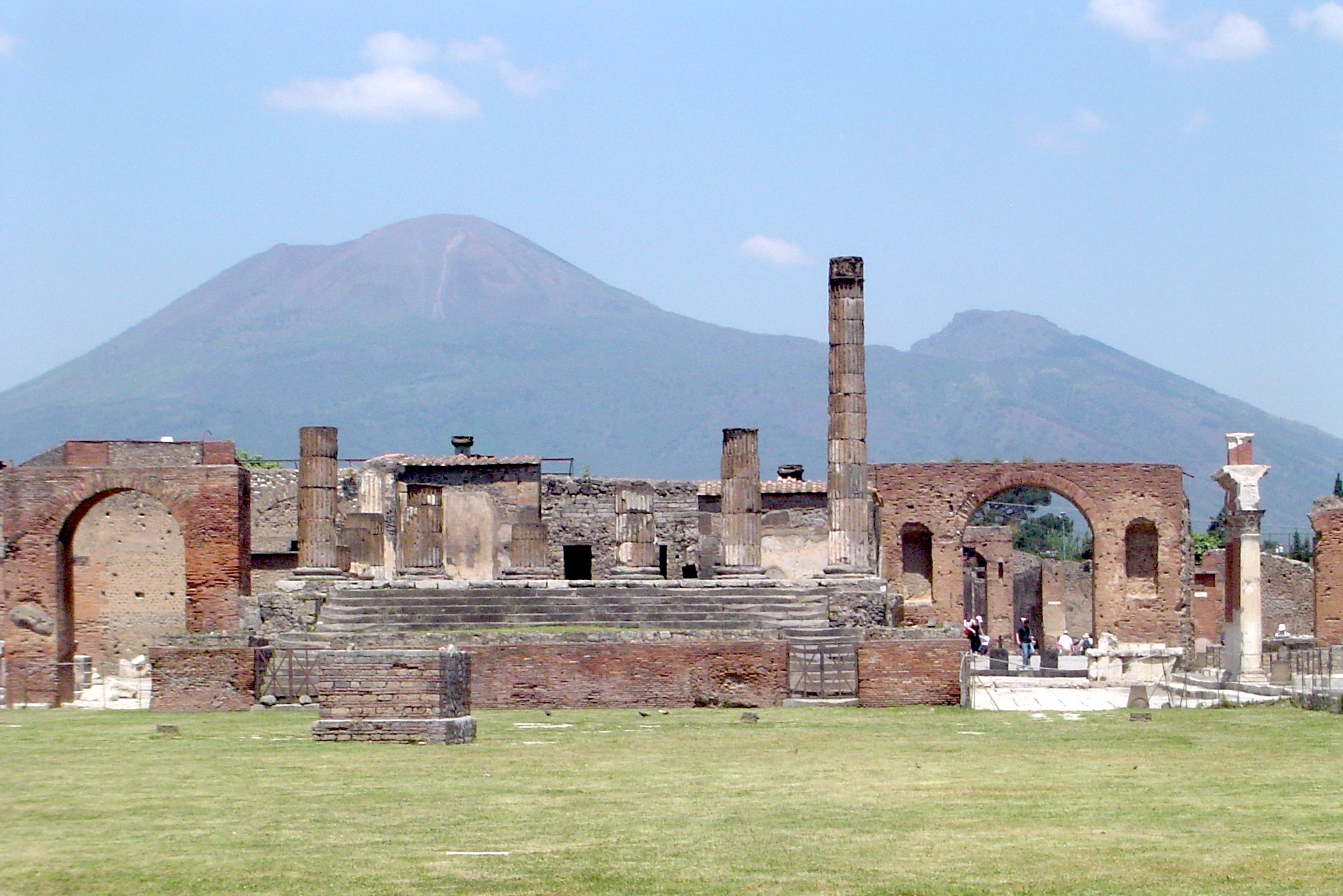
Pompeii, with Vesuvius towering in the background

The only surviving eyewitness account of the event consists of two letters by Pliny the Younger, who was 17 at the time of the eruption, written to the historian Tacitus some 25 years after the event. Observing the first volcanic activity from Misenum across the Bay of Naples from the volcano, approximately 29 kilometres (18 mi) away, Pliny the Elder (Pliny the Younger's uncle) launched a rescue fleet and went himself to the rescue of a personal friend. His nephew declined to join the party. One of the nephew's letters relates what he could discover from witnesses of his uncle's experiences. In a second letter, the younger Pliny details his own observations after the departure of his uncle.

=== Pliny the Younger ===
Pliny the Younger saw an extraordinarily dense cloud rising rapidly above the mountain:

but in likeness and form it more closely resembled a pine-tree than anything else, for what corresponded to the trunk was of great length and height, and then spread out into a number of branches, [...] At times it looked white, and at other times dirty and spotted, according to the quantity of earth and cinders that were shot up.

— Pliny the Younger, Pliny the Younger: Letters Book 6, Letter 16 to Tacitus

These events and a request by messenger for an evacuation by sea prompted the elder Pliny to order rescue operations in which he sailed away to participate. His nephew attempted to resume a normal life, continuing to study and bathe, but that night a tremor woke him and his mother, prompting them to abandon the house for the courtyard. At another tremor at dawn, the population abandoned the village. After a third tremor, "the sea seemed to roll back upon itself, and to be driven from its banks", which is evidence of a tsunami. There is, however, no evidence of extensive damage from wave action.

A black cloud obscured the early light through which shone flashes, which Pliny likens to sheet lightning, but more extensive. The cloud obscured Point Misenum near at hand and the island of Capraia (Capri) across the bay. Fearing for their lives, the population began calling each other and moving back from the coast along the road. Pliny's mother requested him to abandon her and save his own life, as she was too fleshy and aged to go further, but seizing her hand, he led her away as best he could. A rain of ash fell. Pliny needed to shake off the ash periodically to avoid being buried. Later that same day, the ash stopped falling, and the sun shone weakly through the cloud, encouraging Pliny and his mother to return home and wait for news of Pliny the Elder. The letter compares the ash to a blanket of snow. The earthquake and tsunami damage at that location were not severe enough to prevent continued use of the home.

=== Pliny the Elder ===
Pliny's uncle, Pliny the Elder, was in command of the Roman fleet at Misenum and had meanwhile decided to investigate the phenomenon at close hand in a light vessel. As the ship was preparing to leave the area, a messenger came from his friend Rectina (wife of Bassus) living on the coast near the foot of the volcano, explaining that her party could only get away by sea and asking for rescue. Pliny ordered the immediate launching of the fleet galleys to the evacuation of the coast. He continued in his light ship to the rescue of Rectina's party.

He set off across the bay but encountered thick showers of hot cinders, lumps of pumice, and pieces of rock in the shallows on the other side. Advised by the helmsman to turn back, he stated "Fortune favors the brave" and ordered him to continue to Stabiae (about 4.5 km or 2.8 mi from Pompeii), where Pomponianus was. Pomponianus had already loaded a ship with possessions and was preparing to leave, but the same onshore wind that brought Pliny's ship to the location had prevented anyone from leaving.

Pliny and his party saw flames coming from several parts of the mountain, which Pliny and his friends attributed to burning villages. After staying overnight, the party was driven from the building by its violent shaking. They woke Pliny, who had been napping and snoring loudly. They elected to take to the fields with pillows tied to their heads to protect them from rockfall. They approached the beach again, but the wind had not changed. Pliny sat down on a sail spread for him and could not rise, even with assistance. His friends then departed, escaping ultimately by land. Very likely, he had collapsed and died, the most popular explanation for why his friends abandoned him, although Suetonius offers an alternative story of his ordering a slave to kill him to avoid the pain of incineration. How the slave would have escaped remains a mystery. There is no mention of such an event in his nephew's letters.

In the first letter to Tacitus, his nephew suggested that his death was due to the reaction of his weak lungs to a cloud of poisonous, sulphurous gas that wafted over the group. However, Stabiae was 16 km (9.9 mi) from the vent (roughly where the modern town of Castellammare di Stabia is situated), and his companions were apparently unaffected by the fumes, and so it is more likely that the corpulent Pliny died from some other cause, such as a stroke or heart attack. An asthmatic attack is also not out of the question. His body was found with no apparent injuries the next day once the plume had dispersed.

== Casualties from the eruption ==
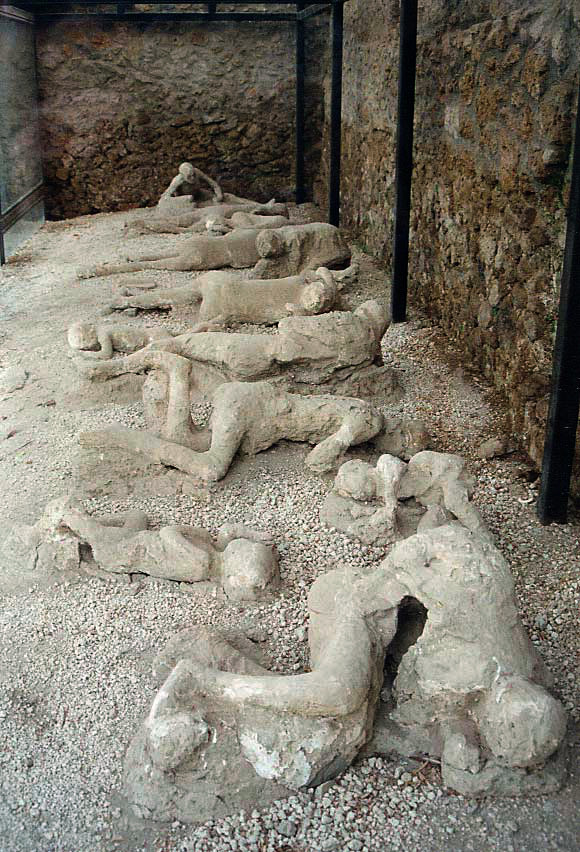
The casts of some victims in the so-called "Garden of the Fugitives", Pompeii

Apart from Pliny the Elder, the only casualties of the eruption to be known by name were:

- The Herodian princess Drusilla and her son Agrippa, who was born in her marriage with the procurator Antonius Felix.
- The merchant Aulus Umbricius Scaurus
- The businessman and politician Alleius Nigidius Maius
- The poet Caesius Bassus

By 2003, approximately 1,044 casts made from impressions of bodies in the ash deposits had been recovered in and around Pompeii, with the scattered bones of another 100. The remains of about 332 bodies have been found at Herculaneum (300 in arched vaults discovered in 1980). The total number of fatalities remains unknown.

Thirty-eight percent of the 1,044 were found in the ash fall deposits, the majority inside buildings. This differs from modern experience over the last 400 years when ash falls have killed only around 4% of victims during explosive eruptions. This cohort was possibly sheltering in buildings when they were overcome. The remaining 62% of bodies found at Pompeii lay in the pyroclastic surge deposits, which probably killed them. It was initially believed that due to the state of the bodies found at Pompeii and the outline of clothes on the bodies, it was unlikely that high temperatures were a significant cause. Later studies indicated that during the fourth pyroclastic surge (the first surge to reach Pompeii), the temperature reached 300 °C (572 °F), which was enough to kill people in a fraction of a second. The contorted postures of bodies as if frozen in suspended action were not the effects of long agony, but of the cadaveric spasm, a consequence of heat shock on corpses. The heat was so intense that organs and blood were vaporised, and it has been suggested that at least one victim's brain was vitrified by the temperature, though this has been disputed.

Herculaneum, which was much closer to the crater, was saved from tephra falls by the wind direction but was buried under 23 metres (75 ft) of material deposited by pyroclastic surges. It is likely that most, or all, of the known victims in this town, were killed by the surges, particularly given evidence of high temperatures found on the skeletons of the victims found in the arched vaults on the seashore and the existence of carbonised wood in many of the buildings. These people were concentrated in the vaults at a density as high as three per square metre and were all caught by the first surge, dying of thermal shock and partly carbonised by later and hotter surges. The vaults were most likely boathouses, as the crossbeams overhead were probably for the suspension of boats used for the earlier escape of some of the population. As only 85 metres (279 ft) of the coast have been excavated, more casualties may be waiting to be unearthed.

== Date of the eruption ==
Vesuvius and its destructive eruption are mentioned in first-century Roman sources, but not the day of the eruption. For example, Josephus in his Antiquities of the Jews mentions that the eruption occurred "in the days of Titus Caesar." Suetonius, a second-century historian, in his Life of Titus simply says that, "There were some dreadful disasters during his reign, such as the eruption of Mount Vesuvius in Campania."

Writing well over a century after the actual event, Roman historian Cassius Dio (as translated in the Loeb Classical Library 1925 edition) wrote that, "In Campania remarkable and frightful occurrences took place; for a great fire suddenly flared up at the very end of the summer."

For more than five centuries, until approximately 2018, articles about the eruption of Vesuvius typically stated that the eruption began on August 24, 79 AD. This date came from a 1508 printed copy of a letter addressed by Pliny the Younger to the Roman historian Tacitus, originally written some 25 years after the event. Pliny was a witness to the eruption and provided the only known eyewitness account. Over fourteen centuries of manuscript hand-copying up to the 1508 printing of his letters, the date given in Pliny's original letter may have been corrupted. Manuscript experts believe that the date originally given by Pliny was one of August 24, October 30, November 1, or November 23. This odd scattered set of dates is due to the Romans' convention for describing calendar dates. The large majority of extant medieval manuscript copies (there are no surviving Roman copies) indicate a date corresponding to August 24. Since the discovery of the cities, this was accepted by most scholars and by nearly all books written about Pompeii and Herculaneum for the general public. In 2022, an analysis of the historical translations claims that no other date than August 24 is supported by evidence from Pliny.

Since at least the late 18th century, a minority among archaeologists and other scientists have suggested that the eruption began after August 24, during the autumn, perhaps in October or November. In 1797, the researcher Carlo Rosini reported that excavations at Pompeii and Herculaneum had uncovered traces of fruits and braziers indicative of autumn, not the summer.

More recently, in 1990 and 2001, archaeologists discovered more remnants of autumnal fruits (such as the pomegranate), the remains of victims of the eruption in heavy clothing, and large earthenware storage vessels laden with wine (at the time of their burial by Vesuvius). The wine-related discovery suggests that the eruption might have happened after the grape harvest.

In 2007, a study of prevailing winds in Campania showed that the southeasterly debris pattern of the first-century eruption is quite consistent with an autumn event and inconsistent with an August date. During June, July, and August, the prevailing winds flow to the west – an arc between the southwest and northwest – virtually all the time.

As Emperor Titus of the Flavian dynasty (reigning June 24, 79 AD to September 13, 81 AD) garnered victories on the battlefield (including his destroying the Temple of Jerusalem) and other honors, his administration issued coins enumerating his ever-growing accolades. Given the limited space on each coin, his achievements were stamped on the coins using an arcane encoding. Two of these coins, from early in Titus' reign, were found in a hoard recovered at Pompeii's House of the Golden Bracelet. Although the coins' minting dates are somewhat in dispute, a numismatic expert at the British Museum, Richard Abdy, concluded that the latest coin in the hoard was minted on or after June 24 (the first date of Titus' reign) and before September 1, 79 AD. Abdy states that it is "remarkable that both coins will have taken just two months after minting to enter circulation and reach Pompeii before the disaster."

In October 2018, Italian archaeologists uncovered a charcoal inscription reading "the 16th day before the calends (first) of November," or October 17, that was probably "made by a worker renovating a home", and which has subsequently been suggested as "the most likely date for the eruption". While the "graffito does not have a year listed [...] the nature of the writing suggests it was done just before the eruption of Vesuvius. It was found in an area of a house that was in the process of being renovated, likely just before the volcano erupted". while the charcoal writing itself is "fragile and unlikely to have been preserved for years prior to the utter destruction of Pompeii." However, "it is not known whether the Oct[ober] 17 graffito referred to that day, or a day in the past or the future." There is some debate about whether charcoal graffito would last more than a year: a study by the Pompeii Archeological Park showed that charcoal graffiti can last for more than a year at the site of the discovered ancient graffito, casting doubt on whether the October date was in 79 AD.

A collaborative study in 2022 has determined a date of "between October 24th and November 1st" for the eruption in 79 AD. This conclusion has been challenged.

== See also ==
- Buildings at Pompeii, including
  - Villa Boscoreale
  - Villa Poppaea
- "Pompeii" (song), a 2013 song by Bastille inspired by the eruption of Mount Vesuvius
- "Cities in Dust", a 1985 song by Siouxsie and the Banshees about the disaster
- Villa of Agrippa Postumus

== Bibliography ==
- Sigurðsson, Haraldur (2002). "Mount Vesuvius Before the Disaster". In Jashemski, Wilhelmina Mary Feemster; Meyer, Frederick Gustav (eds.). The Natural History of Pompeii. Cambridge, UK: The Press Syndicate of the University of Cambridge. pp. 29–36. ISBN 978-0-521-80054-9.
- Sigurðsson, Haraldur; Carey, Steven (2002). "The Eruption of Vesuvius in AD 79". In Jashemski, Wilhelmina Mary Feemster; Meyer, Frederick Gustav (eds.). The Natural History of Pompeii. Cambridge UK: The Press Syndicate of the University of Cambridge. pp. 37–64. ISBN 978-0-521-80054-9.
- Zanella, E.; Gurioli, L.; Pareschi, M. T.; Lanza, R. (2007). "Influences of urban fabric on pyroclastic density currents at Pompeii (Italy): 2. Temperature of the deposits and hazard implications". Journal of Geophysical Research: Solid Earth. 112 (B5) 2006JB004775. Bibcode:2007JGRB..112.5214Z. doi:10.1029/2006JB004775. ISSN 0148-0227. CiteID B05214.
