= Vicus Maracitanus =

Africa Proconsularis (125 AD)

Vicus Maracitanus was a civitas of the Roman Province of Roman North Africa that has been identified with ruins at 36° 01′ 04″ N, 9° 13′ 47″ E the modern village of Ksar-Toual-Zouameul (just south of El Ksour) in Siliana province Tunisia.

The remains are scattered over an area of abpout 800m with a temple and Basilica still evident. The Princeton encyclopedia of classical sites describes the town as:

The modest country town is unquestionably pre-Roman in origin. The chief monument, the Capitolium, which is in the form of a temple with a pronaos that was probably hexastyle, stood on the square of a forum opposite a larger building of unknown purpose. A section of a street, some cisterns, and what may have been a Christian chapel have been excavated.

The name has been confirmed from inscription in situ, prior to that it had been attributed by some to Zama Regia.
